= Ethiopian Canadians =

Ethiopian diaspora in Canada

Total population
- 44,065

Regions with significant populations
- Toronto · Montreal • Calgary · Edmonton · Ottawa · Winnipeg · Vancouver

Languages
- Amharic · Harari · Oromo · Somali · Tigrinya · Canadian English · Canadian French

Religion
- Ethiopian Orthodox Christian · Islam · Judaism

Related ethnic groups
- Ethiopians, Eritreans, Eritrean Canadians, Ethiopian Americans, Eritrean Americans, Somali Canadians, Somali Americans

Ethiopian Canadians are Canadians who are of full or partial Ethiopian national origin, heritage and/or ancestry, Canadian citizens of Ethiopian descent, or an Ethiopia-born person who resides in Canada. According to the 2016 Canadian Census, 44,065 people reported Ethiopian ancestry.

== History ==
Ethiopians began to immigrate to Canada in small numbers following new immigration regulations in 1962, which allowed skilled immigrants into the country regardless of ethnicity or country of origin. However, significant immigration did not occur until the mid-1980s.

== Demographics ==
According to the 2011 Canadian Census, approximately 30,810 people reported Ethiopian ancestry. This number increased to 44,065 by 2016. In addition, a number of people reported other Ethiopian ethnicity: 1,530 people had Amhara ancestry, 660 had Harari ancestry, 3,350 had Oromo ancestry. A further 2,155 reported Tigrayan ancestry, although some of these might be Eritrean. Canada's censuses list four major ethnic identities considered to be Ethiopian ethnic groups: Amhara, Harari, Oromo, and Tigrayan. These numbers cannot be added to people reporting Ethiopian ancestry as this may lead to double counting. Of the people reporting Ethiopian ancestry, 32,790 were Canadian residents born in Ethiopia and 7,510 were recent immigrants.

=== Religion ===
Ethiopian Canadian demography by religion
Religious group	2021 (Note: Religious breakdown proportions based on "Ethiopian" ethnic or cultural origin response on the 2021 census.)		2001 (Note: Religious breakdown proportions based on "Ethiopian" ethnic or cultural origin response on the 2001 census.)	
Religious group	Pop.	%	Pop.	%
Christianity	28,305	66.52%	10,625	67.57%
Islam	10,465	24.59%	4,140	26.33%
Irreligion	3,305	7.77%	855	5.44%
Judaism	290	0.68%	60	0.38%
Buddhism	15	0.04%	0	0%
Hinduism	20	0.05%	10	0.06%
Indigenous spirituality	0	0%	35	0.22%
Sikhism	10	0.02%	0	0%
Other	135	0.32%	10	0.06%
Total Ethiopian Canadian population	42,550	100%	15,725	100%

Ethiopian Canadian demography by Christian sects
Religious group	2021		2001	
Religious group	Pop.	%	Pop.	%
Catholic	1,715	6.06%	1,030	9.69%
Orthodox	14,260	50.38%	5,980	56.28%
Protestant	3,960	13.99%	1,320	12.42%
Other Christian	8,370	29.57%	2,295	21.6%
Total Ethiopian Canadian Christian population	28,305	100%	10,625	100%

== Geographic distribution ==
The following table lists Canadian provinces by Ethiopian population.

Rank	State	Population (2016)
1	Ontario	22,560
2	Alberta	13,225
3	Manitoba	2,900
4	British Columbia	2,550
5	Quebec	1,575
6	Saskatchewan	675
7	Nova Scotia	280
8	New Brunswick	180
9	Newfoundland and Labrador	70
10	Nunavut	30
11	Northwest Territories	20
12	Prince Edward Island	15
13	Yukon	10

=== Toronto ===
The largest group of Ethiopians in Canada is that of Toronto. In the 2016 census, there were 17,730 people who reported their ethnic origin as Ethiopian (15,990), Amhara (500), Oromo (830) and/or Tigrinya (410) in the Toronto CMA. In the 2021 census, the number of people who reported their ethnic origin as Ethiopian (13,515), Amhara (2,165), Oromo (2,000) and/or Tigrinya (2,570) was 20,250. Toronto is home to community organizations such as the Ethiopian Association Toronto, which was founded in 1980. There is a concentration of Ethiopian restaurants and businesses along Danforth Avenue East; the area is unofficially referred to as "Little Ethiopia".

=== Calgary ===
As of 2016, approximately 6,355 people of Ethiopian descent live in Calgary.

=== Edmonton ===
As of 2016, approximately 5,210 people of Ethiopian descent live in Edmonton.

=== Ottawa ===
As of 2016, approximately 2,850 people of Ethiopian descent live in Ottawa. The Dawit family, who were among the first Ethiopians to settle in Canada in the 1960s, lived in Ottawa.

=== Winnipeg ===
As of 2016, approximately 2,520 people of Ethiopian descent live in Winnipeg.

=== Vancouver ===
As of 2016, approximately 2,020 people of Ethiopian descent live in the Vancouver CMA.

=== Other places ===
Approximately 1,575 people of Ethiopian descent live in the province of Quebec, the majority (1,020) of whom live in Montreal.

== Notable individuals ==
=== Athletes ===
- Ali Ahmed, soccer player
- Simon Bairu, long distance runner
- Berhanu Girma, long distance runner
- Marcus Velado-Tsegaye, soccer player
- Miruts Yifter, long distance runner

=== Media personalities ===
- Twomad, YouTuber and streamer

=== Musicians ===
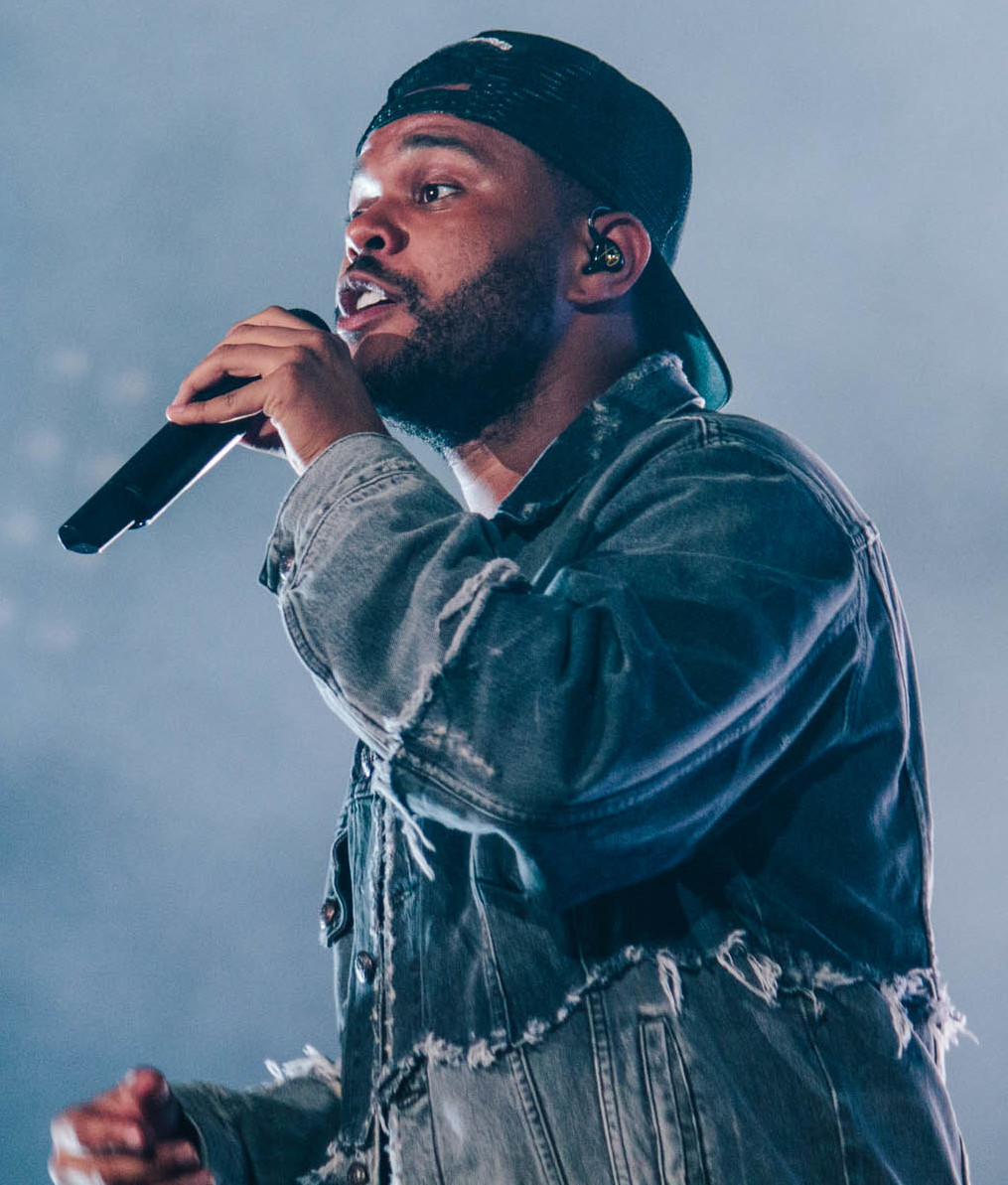
Singer The Weeknd, an Ethiopian Canadian.

- The Weeknd, R&B and pop singer
- Naya Ali, rapper
- Ruth B., singer-songwriter
- Emanuel, rhythm and blues singer
- Witch Prophet, rapper and electronic musician
- XSDTRK, electronic musician

=== Writers ===
- Aida Edemariam, writer and journalist,
- Boonaa Mohammed (Oromo), poet and writer
- Nega Mezlekia, writer

=== Other ===
- Ferid Imam, accused terror suspect
- Binyam Mohamed, accused terror suspect

== See also ==
- Demographics of Ethiopia
- Ethiopian Americans
- Canada–Ethiopia relations
