= Rose Henderson =

Canadian political activist and social reformer

- Born: Rose Mary Louise Wills; 14 December 1871; Dublin, Ireland, United Kingdom
- Died: 30 January 1937 (aged 65); Toronto, Ontario, Canada
- Occupations: Feminist, Socialist, Peace activist
- Spouse: Charles Henderson

Rose Henderson née Wills (14 December 1871 – 30 January 1937) was a Canadian political activist and social reformer.

== Personal life ==
Rose Mary Louise Wills was born on 14 December 1871 in Dublin, Ireland to middle-class parents of English ancestry. She moved to Canada in 1885 as a teenager. She married Charles Henderson, though the date and location of the marriage are unknown. The couple had a daughter, Ida, who was born in 1890 in Quebec. Rose's husband, Charles, died at Royal Victoria Hospital, Montreal in January 1904. There is no evidence showing that Henderson was politically active before her husband's death.

In 1911 Henderson converted to the Baháʼí Faith.

== Political career ==
After Charles's death, Rose Henderson became an activist and social reformer on behalf of Montreal's working class districts. In 1912 Henderson was appointed as a probation officer for the juvenile court. She unsuccessfully ran for Parliament of Canada in 1921 and 1925.

In a 1925 article in The British Columbia Federationist wrote "the power of France rests upon a black basis", which she called "one of the most menacing and sinister facts in history", going to condemn the French for training the Senegalese "to subdue and enslave white people".

She was a member of the Women's International League for Peace and Freedom and in 1936 participated in the World Peace Conference. Henderson contributed to the development of feminist thought distinct from first wave and second wave feminism.

She published Kids what I knows, a collection of poetry and short stories inspired by the children she worked with.

== Death ==
Henderson died on 30 January 1937.
