= Eritrean Canadians =

Eritrean diaspora in Canada

Total population
- 36,290

Regions with significant populations
- Toronto · Calgary · Edmonton · Winnipeg · Ottawa

Languages
- Tigrinya · Tigre · Arabic · Saho · Bilen · Canadian English · Canadian French

Religion
- Eritrean Orthodox · Eritrean Catholic · Sunni Islam

Related ethnic groups
- Eritreans, Ethiopians, Ethiopian Canadians, Eritrean Americans, Ethiopian Americans

Eritrean Canadians are a hyphenated ethnicity of Canadians who are of full or partial Eritrean national origin, heritage and/or ancestry, Canadian citizens of Eritrean descent, or an Eritrean-born person who resides in Canada. According to the 2021 Canadian census, 36,290 Canadians reported Eritrean ancestry.

== History ==
Eritreans began to arrive in Canada as refugees from the Eritrean War of Independence in the late 1970s.

== Demographics ==
According to the 2011 Canadian Census, approximately 13,430 people reported Eritrean ancestry. This number increased to 25,255 by 2016 and further increased to 36,290 in 2021. However, accurate numbers of Eritrean refugees are difficult to estimate because many Eritreans who fled before Eritrea's independence had identified as or were considered Ethiopian.

== Geographic distribution ==
The following table lists Canadian provinces by their Eritrean population.

Rank	State	Population (2021)
1	Ontario	17,165
2	Alberta	11,010
3	Manitoba	3,345
4	British Columbia	2,245
5	Saskatchewan	1,235
6	Quebec	800
7	Newfoundland and Labrador	180
8	Nova Scotia	135
9	New Brunswick	115
10	Northwest Territories	45
11	Nunavut	10
12*	Prince Edward Island	0
12*	Yukon	0

=== Toronto ===
The largest group of Eritreans in Canada are located in Toronto. As of 2021, approximately 9,380 people of Eritrean descent live in the Toronto CMA. The Eritrean Canadian Community Centre and Eritrean Canadian Association of Ontario are located in Toronto.

=== Calgary ===
The second largest group of Eritreans in Canada are located in Calgary. As of 2021, approximately 5,395 people of Eritrean descent live in the Calgary CMA. The Eritrean Canadian Community Association of Calgary was founded in 1983.

=== Edmonton ===
As of 2021, approximately 4,605 people of Eritrean descent live in the Edmonton CMA.

=== Winnipeg ===
As of 2021, approximately 3,070 people of Eritrean descent live in the Winnipeg CMA.

=== Ottawa-Gatineau (National Capital Region) ===
As of 2021, approximately 2,095 people of Eritrean descent live in Ottawa, Ontario and 2,135 live in Ottawa-Gatineau.

== Notable people ==
- Shannon-Ogbani Abeda - Bobsledder, alpine skier.
- Simon Bairu - Retired long-distance runner.
- Grace Mahary - Model.
- Amanuel Melles - community organizer.
- SAFE - Rapper, singer, songwriter.

== See also ==
- Demographics of Eritrea
- Religion in Eritrea
- Eritrean Americans
- Foreign relations of Eritrea
- Habesha Peoples
- Ethiopian Canadians
- Ethiopian Americans
