= Black Canadians in Ontario =

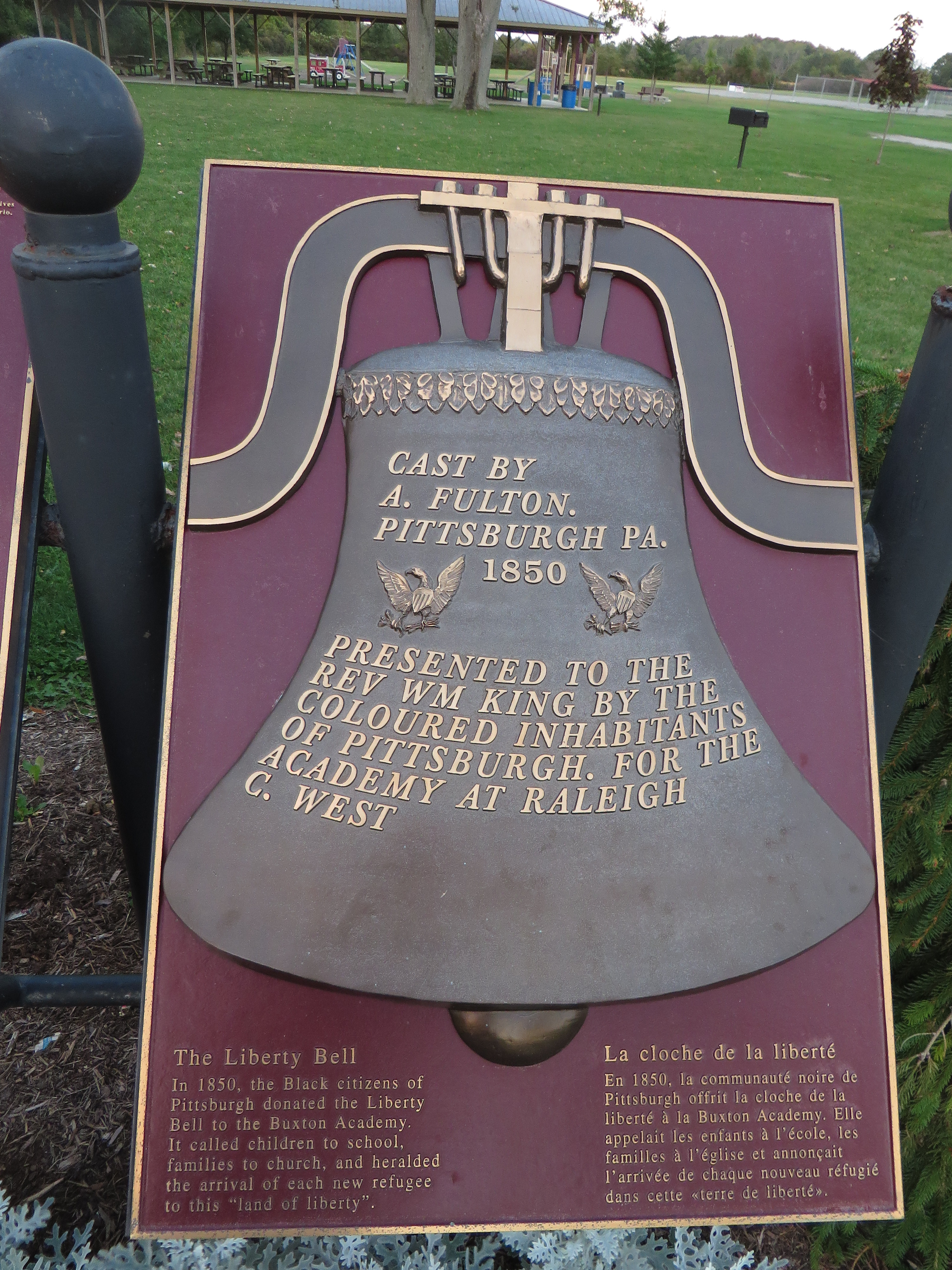
Buxton National Historic Site and Museum, South Buxton, Ontario

Black Canadians migrated north in the 18th and 19th centuries from the United States, many of them through the Underground Railroad, into Southwestern Ontario, Toronto, and Owen Sound. Black Canadians fought in the War of 1812 and Rebellions of 1837–1838 for the British. Some returned to the United States during the American Civil War or Reconstruction era.

== Initial immigrants ==
Formerly enslaved African Americans immigrated to British North America, now Canada, following the Act Against Slavery of 1793 that stipulated that enslaved people would become immediately free upon entering Canada. It also made it illegal to import enslaved people and children of enslaved peoples were free when they reached the age of 25.

Word had spread through the United States that there were free black soldiers who served in the War of 1812 from British North America, which resulted in more African American immigrants. Loyalists who settled in Upper Canada after 1812 brought some enslaved black people to what is now Ontario. They settled along the Detroit, Niagara, and the St. Lawrence Rivers.

== Emancipation ==
John Beverley Robinson, Attorney General, issued an order that freed all black residents in Upper Canada in 1819. In 1833, slavery was abolished throughout the British Empire, which freed almost one million people.

== Underground Railroad ==
Beginning in Philadelphia in the early 19th century, the Underground Railroad was a network of people who wanted to help enslaved people attain freedom from slavery. They operated secretly to guide freedom seekers into the Northern United States (free states) or further north into what is now Canada. Freedom seekers were helped on their journey north by other enslaved people, free black people, Quakers, and other abolitionists. Jermain Wesley Loguen found freedom in what is now Ontario. He lived in Hamilton and St. Catharines from 1837 to 1841, and then he settled in Syracuse, New York, where he operated an Underground Railroad station in Syracuse.

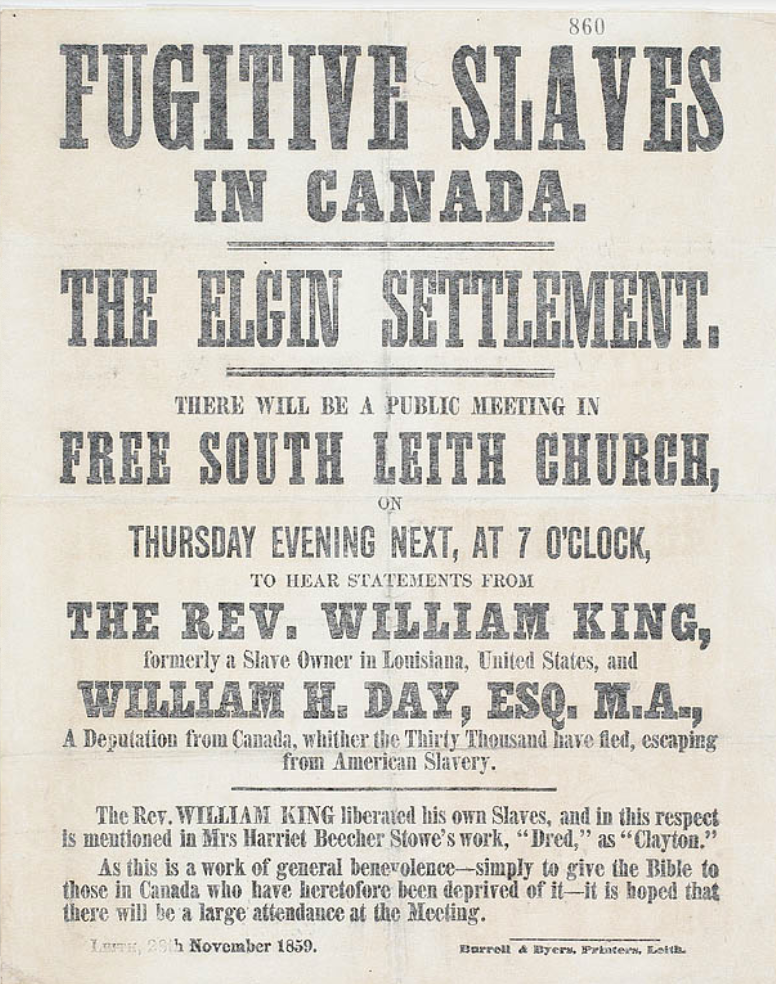
Fugitive Slaves in Canada poster for Rev. William King

There was not a major influx of black people into Canada until the passage of the Fugitive Slave Act of 1850 in the United States. The law made it easier for slave catchers to apprehend African Americans, and freedom seekers planned to settle in what is now Ontario. Some slave catchers came into Canada to earn a reward for capturing enslaved people and re-enslaving them. An enslaver attempted to take his former bondsman, Joseph Alexander, from Chatham. Black community members and Alexander talked to his former enslaver, and the crowd refused to allow him to be taken. The enslaver left Chatham without Alexander, who lived free. See also Chatham Vigilance Committee.

== Settlements ==
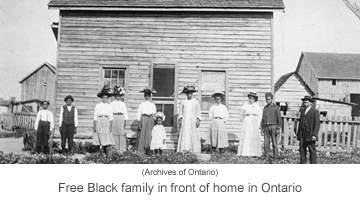
Free Black family in front of home in Ontario

During the American Revolutionary War, Black Loyalists and other freedom seekers escaped to Canada. They settled in Toronto, Owen Sound, and in Southwestern Ontario, including London, Chatham, Amherstburg, Oro, Ontario, and Windsor. They also settled in Sandwich (now part of Windsor), Niagara Falls, Hamilton, Buxton, Brantford, and Oakville. Some people fled to Quebec, Nova Scotia, and New Brunswick.

The Wilberforce Settlement was founded in 1830 near Lucan by African Americans from Cincinnati. They came to Canada because of Black Codes that established legal means to treat black people differently than white people. By 1836, poor management had caused the settlement to break down.

Josiah Henson came to Canada with his wife and four children and founded the Dawn settlement in a rural area near Dresden in 1841. Settlers worked cooperatively to help one another, benefiting from one another's skills. They farmed and operated grist and saw mills and businesses, like rope manufacturing and brick making. The British American Institute was a traditional and vocational school. The Elgin settlement was settled at Buxton near Chatham by Rev. William King, who had been a slaveholder, and 15 of his former enslaved people in 1849. He was a Presbyterian minister who settled in southern Ontario. The Buxton settlement became known for its school. There were 2,000 residents by the 1860s. Another all-Black community in Ontario was Queen's Bush.

African Canadians established farms, worked, and formed businesses, including blacksmith shops, livery stables, carpentry businesses, grocery stores, boutiques, and pharmacies. They developed communities with schools, churches, newspapers, and benevolent societies.

== Anti-slavery efforts ==
Henry Bibb and his wife Mary started The Voice of the Fugitive in 1851 in Windsor. It was an abolitionist newspaper that reported on the activities of the Underground Railroad. Mary Ann Shadd, the first black female publisher and newspaper owner in Canada, and her brother Isaac Shadd founded The Provincial Freeman in 1853. It became a weekly newspaper out of Toronto in 1854, after which it was published in Chatham.

Black and white people founded the Anti-Slavery Society of Canada in Toronto in 1851. It sought to inform others about slavery and to help black freedom seekers.

== Military ==
=== Canada ===
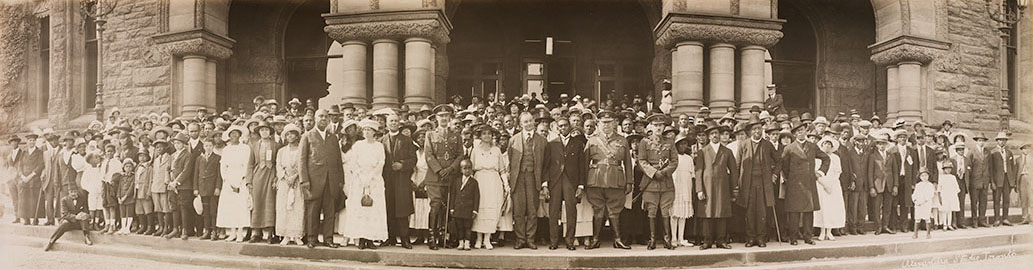
A group of mostly black Canadians pose with Premier Ernest C. Drury and Sir Henry Pellatt on the steps of the Ontario Legislature in Toronto. The photograph was taken at the dedication of a plaque in memory of the members of the No. 2 Construction Battalion, an all-black non-combat battalion that served in World War I. The plaque is in the main hall of Queen's Park. Rev. Mrs. H.F. Logan and Rev. H.F. Logan, who spearheaded the campaign for the plaque, are at left of centre. Also included in the photograph is Rt. Rev. Samuel R. Drake, General Superintendent of the British Methodist Episcopal Church Conference

Black Canadians volunteered and fought during the War of 1812 to protect their new country and to ensure that they were not returned to slavery in the United States. For their service, Lieutenant Governor Sir Peregrine Maitland provided many black people with land grants in Oro Township in 1815. The land was not arable, so they did not stay on it. During the Rebellions of 1837–1838, they served in separate "Colored Corps" units and fought to protect the rights of African Canadians and defend the government.

=== American Civil War ===
Almost 1,000 black Canadians served in the Union Army during the American Civil War (1861–1865). African Americans were declared free due to the Emancipation Proclamation, and slavery was officially abolished in the United States by the Thirteenth Amendment to the Constitution in 1865. Some black people returned to the United States from Canada during the Reconstruction era.

== Popular culture ==
- The North Star: Finding Black Mecca documentary was filmed in Chatham, Dresden, and Buxton.
- Illuminate Black: Shining Light on the Black Presence in Ontario is an onsite exhibit at the Archives of Ontario that documents 250 years of Black History.

== See also ==
- Black Canadians in the Greater Toronto Area
- List of Underground Railroad sites § Ontario
- Indigenous Black Canadians
