= William Lindsay (minister) =

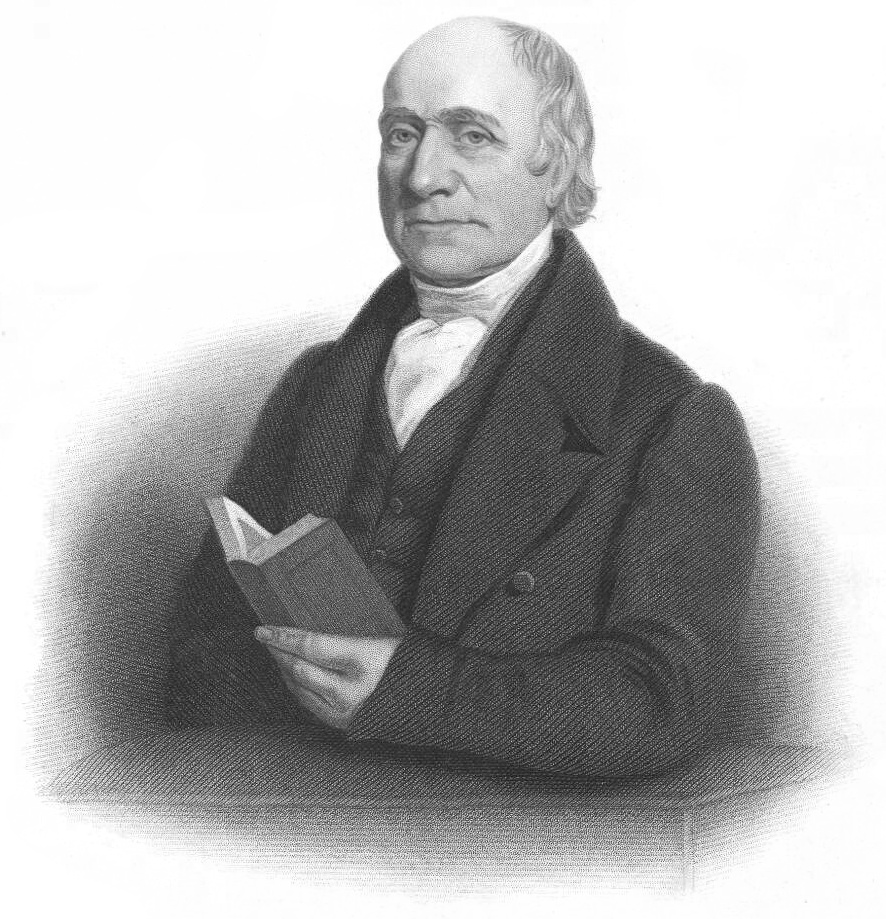
William Lindsay

William Lindsay (1802–1866) was a Scottish minister of the United Presbyterian Church.

== Life ==
Born at Irvine, Ayrshire, Lindsay studied at Glasgow University, and the theological hall of the Relief Church in Paisley, in its early days, under Dr James Thomson.

Lindsay was ordained minister of the Relief Church on 27 April 1830, with first charge the newly formed congregation at Johnstone, Renfrewshire. On 22 November 1832 he was translated to Dovehill Relief Church, Glasgow, a congregation formed in 1766, where he acted as colleague of John Barr, and on Barr's death in 1839 succeeding to the sole charge.

In 1841 Lindsay was appointed professor of exegetical theology and biblical criticism by the Relief Synod. He moved with his congregation from Dovehill to a new church in Cathedral Street, Glasgow, in 1844, as the Cathedral Street Relief Church. The degree of D.D. was conferred on him by the University of Glasgow in 1844.

After the union of the Relief and other secession churches, forming the United Presbyterian Church in 1847, Lindsay was appointed professor of sacred languages and biblical criticism by the new Synod; and with John Brown, James Harper, Neil McMichael, and John Eadie he formed the staff of the United Presbyterian Hall. On the death of Brown on 13 October 1858, Lindsay was transferred to the chair of exegetical theology. He retained his professorship, with the charge of Cathedral Street United Presbyterian Church till his death, which took place suddenly on Sunday, 3 June 1866.

== Works ==
Lindsay's major works were:

- Life of Rev. Thomas Gillespie of Carnock, one of the Founders of the Relief Church, 1849, the third volume of the "United Presbyterian Fathers" series
- The Miracles of Scripture defended from the assaults of Modern Scepticism, lecture delivered at the opening of the United Presbyterian Hall in 1850.
- The Law of Marriage 1855; 2nd edit. 1871.
- Exposition of Epistle to the Hebrews (edited, 1867) by George Brooks, who succeeded him in the Johnstone pastorate.

== Notes ==
Attribution

This article incorporates text from a publication now in the public domain: Lee, Sidney, ed. (1892). "Lindsay, William (1802-1866)". Dictionary of National Biography. Vol. 30. London: Smith, Elder & Co.

Academic offices
Preceded by James Thomson	Professor of Theology of the Relief Church; 1842-1847; With: Neil M'Michael	Office abolished due to union with the United Secession Church
New title	Professor of Sacred Languages and Biblical Criticism of the United; Presbyterian Church (Scotland); 1847-1859	Chair abolished
Preceded by John Brown	Professor of Exegetical Theology of the United; Presbyterian Church (Scotland); 1859-1866	Chair abolished
