= George Lawson (Scottish minister) =

Scottish minister of the Secession Church (1749–1821)

The Reverend George Lawson D.D.
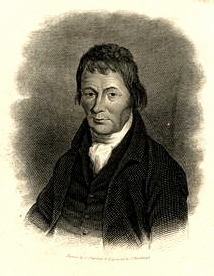

Personal details
- Born: 13 March 1749
- Died: 21 February 1820 (aged 70)
- Denomination: (1) Burgher Seceder; (2) New Licht Burgher Seceder
- Occupation: Minister

George Lawson D.D. (1749–1820) was a Scottish minister of the Secession Church, known as a biblical scholar. Thomas Carlyle, in an 1870 letter to Lawson's biographer John Macfarlane, called him "a most superlative steel-grey Scottish peasant (and Scottish Socrates of the period)".

== Life ==
Born at the farm of Boghouse, in the parish of West Linton, Peeblesshire, on 13 March 1749, he was the second son of Charles Lawson, a farmer and carpenter, and his wife Margaret Noble: he was the only one of six sons who survived childhood. His father taught George, who was studious. His parents then sent him to John Johnston(e), Secession Church minister at Ecclefechan, Dumfriesshire.

Lawson went to the University of Edinburgh, and later studied divinity under John Swanston of Kinross, and John Brown of Haddington, successive professors of theology in the Associate Secession (Burgher) church. At age 21 he was licensed as a preacher, and receiving a call from the congregation of Burgher seceders at Selkirk, was ordained their pastor on 17 April 1771. Mungo Park was one of his congregation.

Belying his wide reading, Lawson preached extempore with facility and simplicity. On the death of Brown, Lawson was chosen his successor in the Burgher chair of theology (2 May 1787). He held it until his death on 21 February 1820. In 1806 the University of Aberdeen conferred on him the degree of D.D. His habit of life was simple; he was absent-minded, and was said to have forgotten the day fixed for his marriage.

== Divinity Hall, Selkirk ==
The Divinity Hall at Selkirk was an institution rather than a building, in that students lived in lodging, and lectures took place in the church and manse. Annual theology courses ran for two months (nine weeks), during university vacations, and required five such courses to cover the syllabus. The lectures involved close reading of Bible passages in the original Hebrew and Greek. Students taught there by Lawson included (chronological list):

- Henry Belfrage from 1789
- George Young
- David Stewart Wylie
- William Glen (1778–1849)
- Ralph Wardlaw
- John Brown (1784–1858) from 1800
- Alexander Fletcher from 1802
- James Henderson from 1804
- Robert Balmer from 1806
- John McKerrow from 1807
- James Harper (1795–1879) from 1813
- Robert Simpson of Sanquhar from 1814
- William Kennedy

== Works ==
Lawson's major works published in his lifetime were:

- Considerations of the Overture lying before the Associate Synod on the Power of the Civil Magistrate in matters of Religion. 1797. There was a reply from John Thomson of Glasgow. Lawson's work, with a Synod sermon by John Dick on 2 Timothy 1:13, effectively opened for the "New Lights" in the Associated Synod the Old and New Lights controversy that ran for the rest of the 1790s, set off by the request in May 1795 by John Frazer of Auchtermuchty, for a modified subscription to theological standards. On the Old Light side were William Willis of Greenock, William Taylor of Levenside, George Thomson, sometime minister at Rathillet. Weighing in with the latter was William Porteous, and with the former James Peddie. The outcome saw a withdrawal of some Old Lights. As a consequence, an Old Light Burgher Divinity Hall was set up by Willis in 1799, in Greenock then Stirling. The group existed to 1839, when it merged into the Church of Scotland.
- Discourses on the Book of Esther, with Sermons on Parental Duties, Military Courage, &c. 1804; 2nd edit. 1809. Lawson applied Hebrews 11:32–11:34 to align Esther with traditionally male virtues.
- Discourses on the Book of Ruth, with others on the Sovereignty of Divine Grace, 1805.
- Lectures on the History of Joseph, 2 vols., Edinburgh, 1807; other editions 1812 and 1878.
- Sermons on the Death of Faithful Ministers; Wars and Revolutions: and to the Aged. Hawick, 1810.

After his death were published:

- Exposition of the Book of Proverbs. 1821.
- Discourses on the History of David, and on the introduction of Christianity into Britain. Berwick, 1833.
- Reflections on the Illness and Death of a beloved Daughter. Edinburgh, 1866.
- Helps to a Devout Life, 1878, selections from lectures, edited by John Lawson

Lawson knew the Scriptures by heart, and much of them in Hebrew and Greek. He left at his death some 80 large volumes in manuscript, forming a commentary on the Bible. He contributed articles to the Christian Repository, a Burgher church evangelical periodical started in London in 1815; and other papers appeared in the United Secession Magazine.

== Family ==
Lawson married, first, Miss Roger, the daughter of a Selkirk banker, who died within a year of the marriage; and secondly, the daughter of Andrew Moir, his predecessor at Selkirk. She was the widow of the Rev. Alexander Dickson of Berwick. They were brought together through James Peddie in Edinburgh. With her Lawson had five daughters and three sons; two of the sons, George and Andrew, were their father's successors at Selkirk.

== In literature ==
Lawson is supposed to have been the original of Josiah Cargill in Walter Scott's Saint Ronan's Well.

== Notes ==
Academic offices
Preceded by John Brown of Haddington	Professor of Theology of the Burgher Secession Church in Scotland; 1787-1800	Succeeded by William Willis as Professor of Theology of the 'Old Light' Burgher; Secession Church in Scotland
Preceded by John Brown of Haddington	Professor of Theology of the Burgher Secession Church in Scotland; 1787-1800	Succeeded by Himself as Professor of Theology of the 'New Light' Burgher; Secession Church in Scotland
Preceded by Himself as Professor of Theology of the Burgher; Secession Church in Scotland	Professor of Theology of the 'New Light' Burgher; Secession Church in Scotland; 1800-1820	Succeeded by John Dick
