= James Peddie (minister) =

Scottish presbyterian minister of the Secession Church (1758–1845)

- Moderator
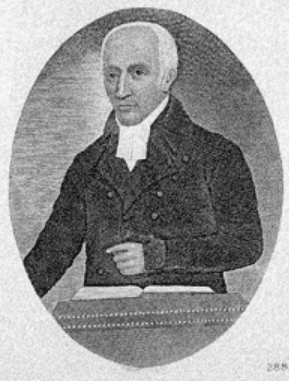
- Caricature of James Peddie in 1810 by John Kay
- Church: Presbyterian

Personal details
- Born: 1758 Perth, Scotland
- Died: 1845 (aged 86–87)
- Buried: Warriston Cemetery
- Denomination: (1) Burgher Seceder; (2) New Licht Burgher Seceder; (3) New Licht United Secession Church
- Children: Alexander Peddie and eight others
- Occupation: Minister
- Education: University of Edinburgh

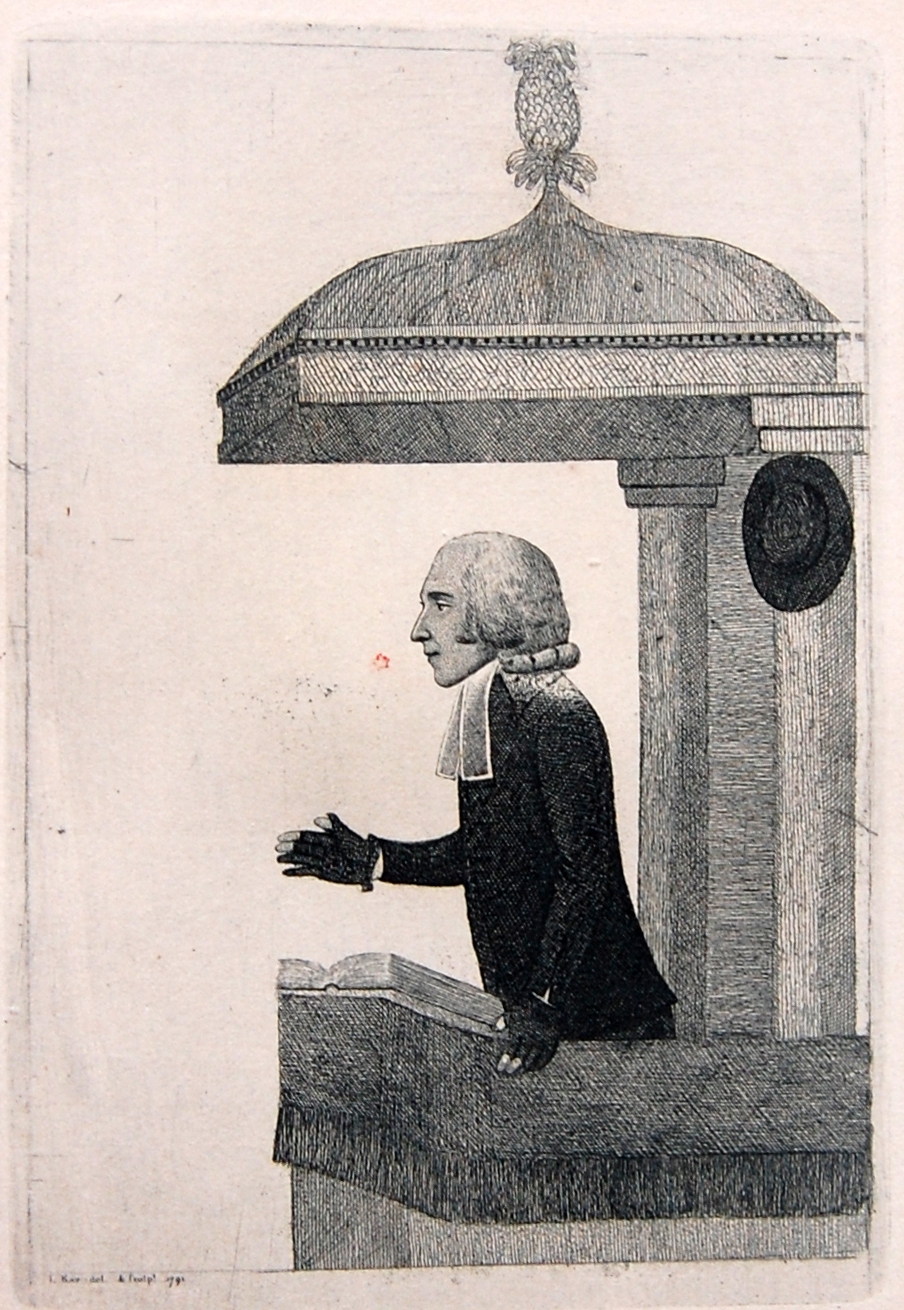
Rev. Dr. James Peddie in his pulpit

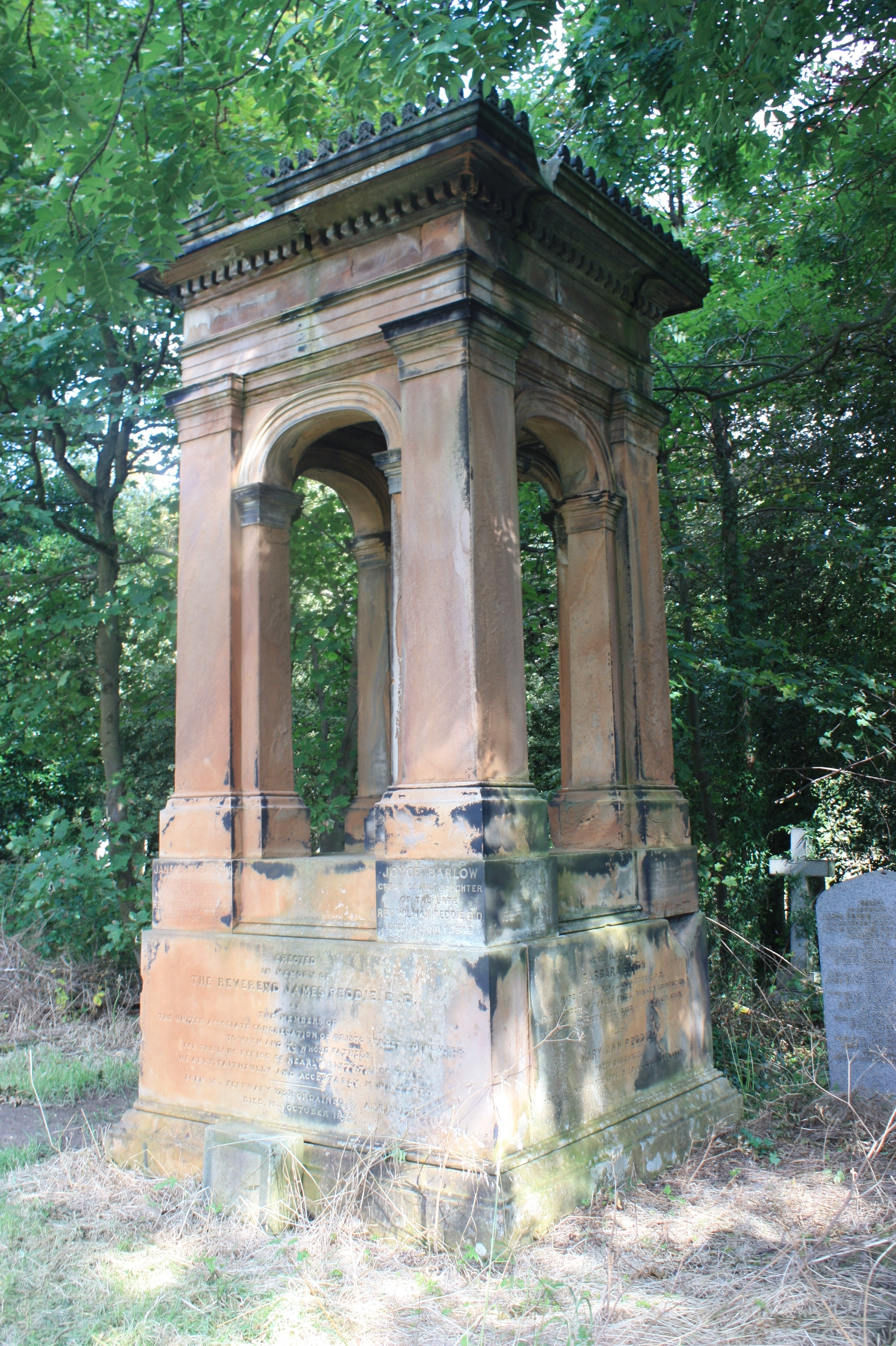
The Peddie monument, Warriston Cemetery

James Peddie (1758–1845) was a Scottish presbyterian minister of the Secession Church.

== Life ==
The son of James Peddie, a brewer, by his second wife, Ann Rattray, he was born at Perth, Scotland on 10 February 1758. After education at Perth Grammar School and Perth Academy he entered the University of Edinburgh in 1775, and two years later became a member of the Secession Divinity Hall, under John Brown of Haddington. Licensed to preach in 1782, he travelled about the country for some time, speaking in pulpits where there was no regular minister. For seven months he averaged a hundred miles per month on horseback.

Towards the end of 1782, against opposition, Peddie was appointed to the Bristo Street Secession chapel in Edinburgh, and took this position in April 1783. The congregation split, with some moving to a new church in Rose Street, set up in 1786. Peddie remained at Bristo Street for the rest of his life. He founded the Edinburgh Subscription Library in 1794, with the Rev. Gavin Struthers.

Peddie was twice moderator, of the Associate Synod in 1789, and again in 1825 for the Synod of the United Secession Church. From 1791 he was treasurer to the fund for assisting poor outlying congregations. He was also involved in missionary societies, and the Sunday school and Gaelic school movements.

== Old and New Lights ==
Peddie took a leading, though generally restrained part in the Old and New Lights controversy in his church. In 1795 matters came to a head, and Peddie sided with the New Lights, for toleration and liberty. A matter arising was the extended Perth congregation lawsuit Craigdallie v Aikman, between supporters of John Jervie and those of Jedidian Aikman. It continued from 1799 to 1815, and decided the legal position of the party New Light: Peddie gave it his zeal and energy.

In the early days of the controversy, attempts were made by opponents to associate the New Lights with the friends of the French Revolution. Peddie communicated with William Pitt the younger through Pulteney, and Henry Dundas referred to the New Lights as "loyal citizens, who had been calumniated."

== Later life ==
In 1818 Marischal College conferred on Peddie the degree of Doctor of Divinity (D.D.). He lived his final years at 37 Lauriston Place in Edinburgh and died there on 11 October 1845. He is buried with his family in Warriston Cemetery.

== Works ==
Peddie's best-known work was a controversial pamphlet, against an attack of 1799 by William Porteous, The New Light Examined; or Observations on the Proceedings of the Associate Synod against their Own Standards. Peddie's reply A Defence of the Associate Synod against the Charge of Sedition, addressed to William Porteous, D.D. had the approval of Dugald Stewart as a model of invective. He published also:

- The Revolution the Work of God and a Cause of Joy, Edinburgh, 1789. This work was a commemoration of the Glorious Revolution.
- The Perpetuity, Advantages, and Universality of the Christian Religion, Edinburgh, 1796.
- Jehovah's Care to perpetuate the Redeemer's Name, London, 1809.
- A Practical Exposition of the Book of Jonah, in ten lectures, Edinburgh, 1842.

After Peddie's death, his son William published his Discourses, Edinburgh, 1846, with a memoir.

Peddie wrote for theological publications, and from 1797 to 1802 he was one of the editors of the Christian Magazine. He also edited the posthumous works of James Meikle of Carnwath (Edinburgh, 1801, 1803, 1805, 1807, 1811).

== Views ==
When at the Divinity Hall, Peddie reportedly opposed the orthodox teaching of John Brown, that civil magistrates ought to have power to interfere in religious matters, and to have upheld the doctrine of John Locke's A Letter Concerning Toleration. He became an advocate of religious voluntaryism in the United Secession Church, with Hugh Heugh, across all Scottish Protestantism.

== Family ==
Peddie was twice married: first, in 1787, to Margaret Coventry (died 1792), eldest daughter of the Rev. George Coventry of Stitchell, Roxburghshire, and sister of Prof Andrew Coventry. The marriage was childless.

Secondly, in 1795, he married Barbara Smith, second daughter of Donald Smith, an Edinburgh banker and later Lord Provost of Edinburgh (1808), with whom he had nine children. The sons included William Peddie (1805–1893), minister who from 1828 was his colleague at Bristo Street; and Alexander Peddie.

His daughter Barbara Peddie (d. 1885) married Rev Principal James Harper (1795–1879) of United Secession Church in North Leith.
