= Henry Belfrage =

Scottish minister of the Secession church (1774–1835)

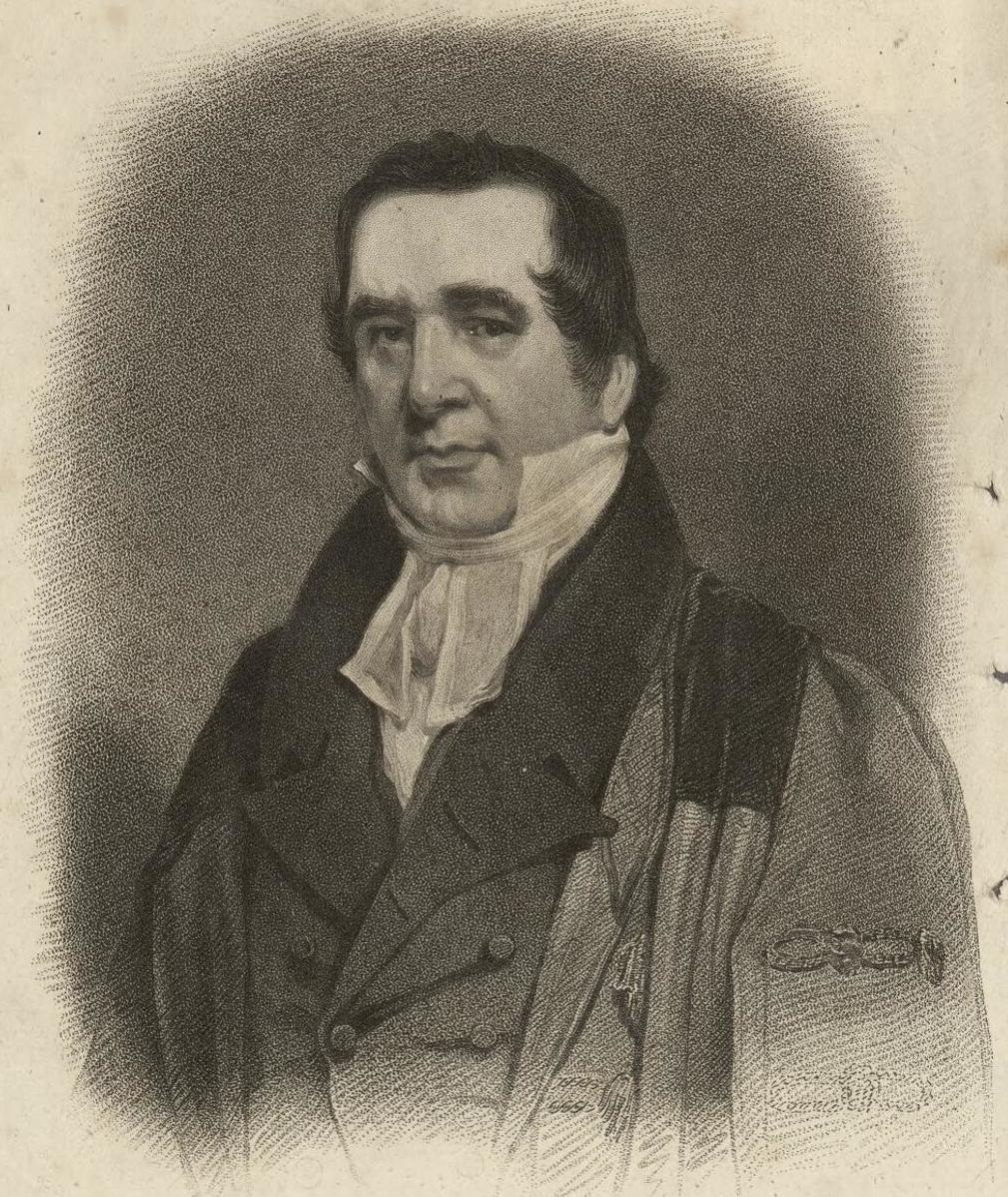

Personal details
- Born: 1774
- Died: 1835 (aged 60–61)
- Denomination: (1) Burgher Seceder; (2) New Licht Burgher Seceder; (3) New Licht United Secession Church
- Spouse: Margaret Gardiner (m. 1828)
- Occupation: Minister

Rev Henry Belfrage (1774–1835) was a Scottish minister of the Secession church.

== Life ==
He was son of the Rev. John Belfrage, minister of the first Associate congregation in Falkirk, Stirlingshire, who was of a Kinross-shire family. The father was born at Colliston on 2 February 1736, soon after the Secession. He had been called to Falkirk in 1758; married Jean Whyte, daughter of John Whyte, a corn merchant, who belonged to the congregation, and had by her five sons and seven daughters. Henry was the fourth son, and was born at the manse in Falkirk on 24 March 1774. From the first he was destined by his parents to be a minister of the Gospel. He 'ran away' to school, while between four and five, along with his elder brother Andrew. At six he read Latin grammatically. He had the advantage of a good teacher at the grammar school in James Meek. At ten he used to preach, and was commonly spoken of as 'the young or wee minister.' In his thirteenth year he proceeded to the University of Edinburgh, in 1786 (November), with his elder brother Andrew. He at once took a high place in his Latin and Greek classes, and read Latin, Greek, and Hebrew as readily as English.

Belfrage entered the Theological Hall of his church at Selkirk, under George Lawson, in the autumn of 1789, aged 14. His attendance was only required there for about eight weeks in the summer, and he managed to carry on his studies in the winter at the university till age 18. On 16 May 1793 he appeared for examination before his presbytery, and received license on 1 July. His father's congregation at once invited him to be colleague with his father on 31 August 1793. He was also invited to congregations in Saltcoats and Lochwinnoch. The synod, or supreme ecclesiastical court, assigned him to Falkirk, in accordance with his own wish. He was ordained on 18 June 1794, The congregation was a large and influential one, its first minister having been Henry, son of Ralph Erskine, one of the fathers of the Secession. He devoted himself energetically to his pulpit and pastoral work; he was the main founder in 1812 of a charity school or ragged school which still exists, and of a Sunday school.

In 1824 the University of St Andrews conferred upon him the honorary degree of D.D., unusually through Sir Henry Moncrieff-Wellwood, of the Church of Scotland. He died 16 September 1835. In 1837 was published Life and Correspondence of the Rev. Henry Belfrage, D.D., by John McKerrow and Rev. John Macfarlane, with an appendix on his works.

== Works ==
Belfrage began in 1814 a series of religious publications. A first series of Sacramental Addresses appeared in 1812, and a second in 1821; and Practical Discourses intended to promote the Happiness and Improvement of the Young in 1817 (2nd ed. 1827). Other works were:

- Sketches of Life and Character from Scripture and from Observation (1822);
- Monitor to Families, or Discourses on some of the Duties and Scenes of Domestic Life (1823);
- A Guide to the Lord's Table (1823);
- Discourses to the Aged (1826);
- Counsels for the Sanctuary and for Civil Life (1829);
- Memoirs of Dr. Alexander Waugh, with Dr. James Hay (1830);
- A Portrait of John the Baptist (1830);
- Practical Exposition of the Assembly's Shorter Catechism (1822, and 2 vols. 1834);
- Select Essays (1833).

His Exposition of the Assembly's Shorter Catechism was used in Scotland, British colonies and the United States.

== Family ==
Belfrage married, in September 1828, Margaret Gardiner, youngest daughter of Richard Gardiner, comptroller of the Customs, Edinburgh.
