= John Brown (minister) =

- Born: July 12, 1784
- Died: October 13, 1858
- Church: (1) New Licht Burgher Seceder; (2) New Licht United Secession Church; (3) United Presbyterian Church (Scotland)

John Brown (July 12, 1784 – October 13, 1858) was a Scottish minister and theologian, known for his exegesis as a preacher.

== Life ==
The grandson of John Brown of Haddington, he was born at Whitburn, Linlithgowshire. He studied at Glasgow university, and afterwards at the divinity hall of the Burgher branch of the Secession church at Selkirk, under George Lawson. In 1806 he was ordained minister of the Burgher congregation at Biggar, Lanarkshire, where he laboured for sixteen years. While there he had a controversy with Robert Owen the socialist.

Transferred in 1822 to the charge of Rose Street church, Edinburgh, he at once took a high rank as a preacher. In 1829 he succeeded James Hall at Broughton Place church, Edinburgh. In. 1835 he was appointed one of the professors in the theological hall of the Secession church. The first in Scotland to use in the pulpit the exegetical method of exposition of Scripture, and as a professor he illustrated the method and extended its use. To him chiefly is due the abandonment of the principle of interpretation according to the analogy of faith, which practically subordinated the Bible to the creed. He had a considerable share in the Apocrypha controversy; and he was throughout life a vigorous and consistent upholder of anti-state-church or voluntary views. He supported the separation of church and state.

In Edinburgh an impost called the annuity tax was levied for the support of the city's Church of Scotland ministers. This Brown finally refused to pay, whereupon in 1838 his goods were twice seized and sold. His two sermons on The Law of Christ respecting civil obedience, especially in the payment of tribute, called forth by this grievance and the controversy it engendered, were later published with extensive additions and notes. The part he took in the discussion on the Atonement, which agitated all the Scottish churches, led to a formal charge of heresy against him by those who held the doctrine of a limited atonement. In 1845, after a protracted trial, he was acquitted by the synod.

From that time he enjoyed the thorough confidence of his denomination (after 1847 merged in the United Presbyterian Church of Scotland), of which in his later years he was generally regarded as the leading representative.

In later life he lived in Arthur Lodge, an impressive Georgian villa in the Newington district.

== Family ==
He was married to Jane Nimmo (d.1816). Their children included Dr John Brown. His second wife was Margaret Fisher Crum, mother of Alexander Crum Brown.

== Works ==
His major works were:

- Expository Discourses on First Peter (1848)
- Exposition of the Discourses and Sayings of our Lord (1850)
- Exposition of our Lord's Intercessory Prayer (1850)
- The Resurrection of Life (1851)
- Expository Discourses on Galatians (1853)
- Analytical Exposition of the Epistle to the Romans (1857).
- An Exposition of the Epistle of the Apostle Paul to the Hebrews (1862)

Academic offices
Preceded by John Dick as Professor of Theology of the United; Secession Church	Professor of Exegetical Theology of the United Secession Church; 1833-1847	Succeeded by Himself as Professor of Exegetical Theology of the United; Presbyterian Church (Scotland)
Preceded by Himself as Professor of Exegetical Theology of the United Secession Church	Professor of Exegetical Theology of the United; Presbyterian Church (Scotland); 1847-1858	Succeeded by William Lindsay
