= John Eddy =

John Eddy may refer to:

- John Eddy (sailor) (1915–1981), British sailor
- John A. Eddy (1931–2009), American astronomer
- Jonathan Eddy (c. 1726–1804), British-American soldier

== See also ==
- John Eddie (born 1959), American rock singer
- John Eadie (1810–1876), Scottish theologian
- John Eadie (cricketer) (1861–1923), English brewer and cricketer
- John Edie (disambiguation)
