= John Dick (minister) =

Scottish theologian and minister (1764–1833)

Personal details
- Born: 10 October 1764 Aberdeen, Scotland
- Died: 1833 (aged 68–69)
- Denomination: (1) Burgher Seceder (2) New Licht Burgher Seceder (3) New Licht United Secession Church
- Occupation: minister

John Dick (1764–1833) was a Scottish minister and theological writer.

== Life ==
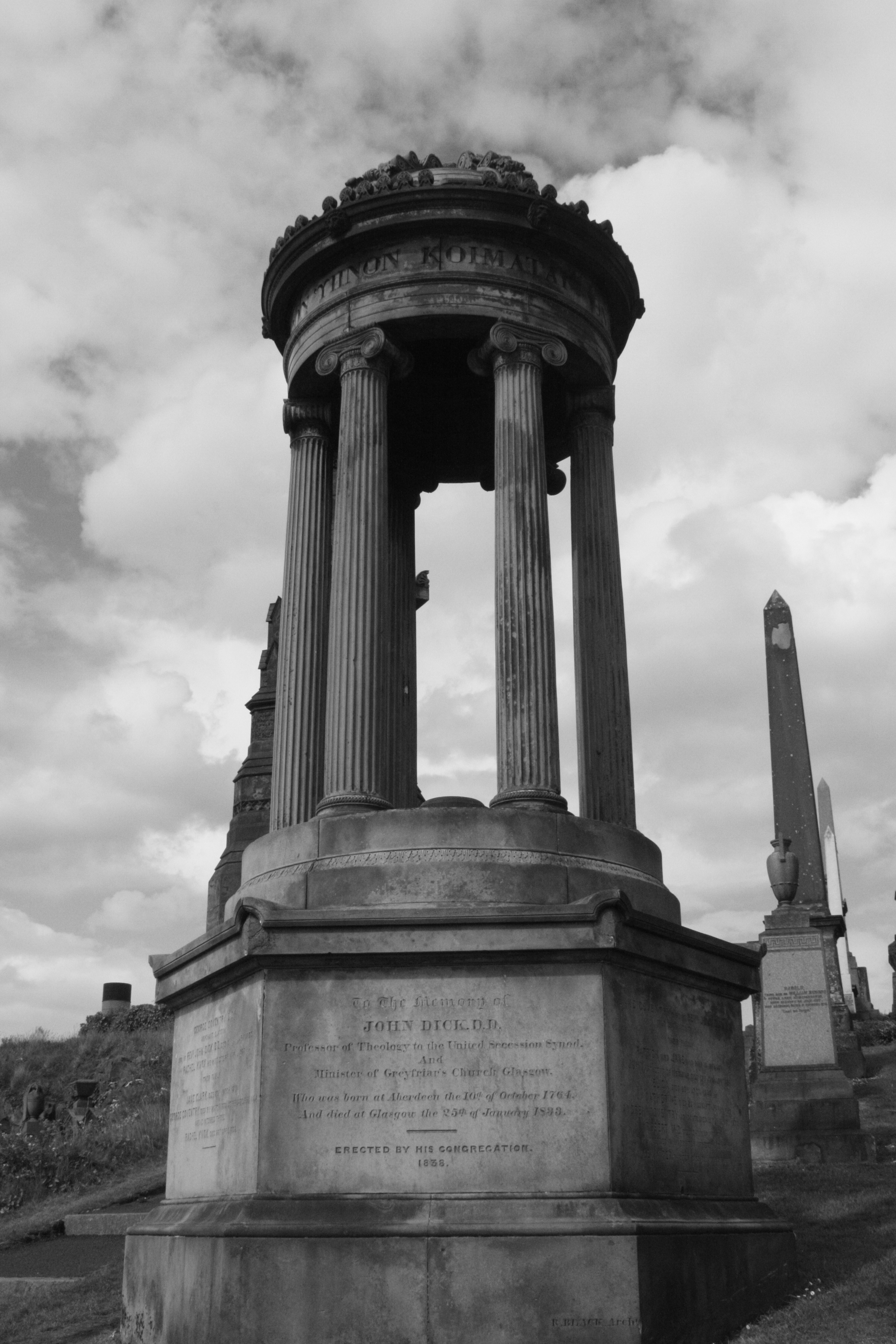
The grave of Rev John Dick, Glasgow Necropolis

He was born on 10 October 1764 at Aberdeen, where his father was minister of the associate congregation of seceders. His mother was Helen Tolmie, daughter of Captain Tolmie of Aberdeen. Educated at the grammar school and King's College, Aberdeen, he studied for the ministry of the Secession church, under John Brown of Haddington.

In 1785, immediately after being licensed as a probationer, Dick was called by the congregation of the newly built United Secession Church in Slateford, near Edinburgh, and ordained to the ministry there. This church still exists at the foot of Lanark Road but is hidden behind other buildings.

At Slateford, Dick began to take an active share in the business of his church. He vindicated the use of confessions, but inculcated the duty of the church to be tolerant of minor disagreements. In 1799 this controversy was ended by the synod enacting a preamble to the confession, declaring that the church required no assent to anything which favoured the principle of compulsory measures in religion. A minority dissented from this finding, and, withdrawing from their brethren, formed a new body, "The Original Associate Synod".

In 1801 Dick became minister of a prominent congregation in Glasgow, now called Greyfriars, in which charge he continued up to the time of his death. In 1815 he received the degree of D.D. from Princeton College, New Jersey. In 1819 the death of George Lawson left vacant the office of theological professor to the associate synod, and in 1820 Dick was chosen to succeed him. Regarding his theological standpoint, his son wrote:

[...] he adhered to the great protestant rule of making the Bible, in its plain meaning, the source of his religious creed, and the basis of his theological system. His distrust of reason as a guide in religion was deeply sincere, and never wavered; and so was his confidence in revelation.

In politics Dick sympathised with the reforming party, and he objected to church establishments. He combined the offices of professor of divinity and minister of Greyfriars Church up to the time of his death, which occurred suddenly on 25 January 1833.

He is buried under a monument on the top of the Glasgow Necropolis.

== Works ==
In 1788, when William M'Gill of Ayr shook the Protestant community of Scotland by an essay on the death of Christ, of Unitarian tendencies, Dick published a sermon in opposition entitled The Conduct and Doom of False Teachers. In 1796, when objection had been taken by several ministers in his church to the teaching of the confession of faith on the duty of the civil magistrate to the church, he preached and published a sermon entitled Confessions of Faith shown to be necessary, and the duty of churches with respect to them explained.

In 1800 he published an Essay on the Inspiration of the Scriptures, which gave him a standing as a theological writer. The occasion of this publication was, that in a dispute in the Secession church regarding the descending obligation of the Scottish covenants, it had been affirmed that those who were not impressed by arguments in its favour from the Old Testament, could not believe in the inspiration of the Old Testament books. Dick wrote his book to rebut this argument. He held the doctrine of plenary inspiration; but under the term "inspiration" he included supernatural influence.

Dick also published during his lifetime Lectures on some Passages of the Acts of the Apostles. In 1833, after his death, his theological lectures were published in 4 vols. a second edition being published in 1838.

== Family ==
A few years after moving to Slateford he married Jane, daughter of the Rev. George Coventry, Stitchell, Roxburghshire, and sister of Dr. Andrew Coventry of Shanwell, professor of agriculture in the University of Edinburgh. Their daughter Helen married Humphrey Crum.

== Notes ==
Attribution

This article incorporates text from a publication now in the public domain: "Dick, John". Dictionary of National Biography. London: Smith, Elder & Co. 1885–1900.

Academic offices
Preceded by George Lawson	Professor of Theology of the 'New Light' Burgher Secession Church in Scotland; 1820	Succeeded by Himself as Professor of Theology of the United Secession Church
Preceded by Himself as Professor of Theology of the 'New Light' Burgher Secession Church in Scotland	Professor of Theology of the United Secession Church; 1820-1833	Succeeded by John Brown as Professor of Exegetical Theology of the United Secession Church
Preceded by George Paxton as Professor of Theology of the 'New Light'; Anti-Burgher Secession; Church in Scotland	Professor of Theology of the United Secession Church; 1820-1833	Succeeded by Alexander Duncan as Professor of Pastoral Theology of the United Secession Church
Preceded by George Paxton as Professor of Theology of the 'New Light'; Anti-Burgher Secession; Church in Scotland	Professor of Theology of the United Secession Church; 1820-1833	Succeeded by Robert Balmer as Professor of Systematic Theology of the United Secession Church
