= John Edie =

John Edie may refer to:

- John Edie (New Zealand politician) (1856–1928), member of parliament in Otago, New Zealand
- John Rufus Edie (1814–1888), member of the U.S. House of Representatives

== See also ==
- John Eddie (born 1959), American rock singer
- John Eadie (1810–1876), Scottish theologian
- John Eadie (cricketer) (1861–1923), English brewer and cricketer
- John Eddy (disambiguation)
