= William Kennedy (poet) =

Scottish poet & diplomat (1799–1871)

William Kennedy (1799–1871) was a Scottish poet, journalist and writer, known also as a diplomat.

== Life ==
Kennedy was born on 26 December 1799, near Dublin, where his father, an Ayrshire man, worked as a manufacturer. He was a student at the Belfast Academical Institution in 1819, and then studied at George Lawson's seminary for dissenting students at Selkirk. Subsequently he was in Paisley, assisting William Motherwell on the Paisley Magazine.

Kennedy left Paisley in 1828, and for a short time afterwards was probably a journalist in Kingston upon Hull, where he married his employer's daughter. In London in 1830 he was writing for a living, and collaborated with Leitch Ritchie. There he met Mary Howitt, in a literary milieu described by Laetitia Elizabeth Landon in Romance and Reality.

Kennedy was appointed as secretary to John Lambton, 1st Earl of Durham when he went to Canada in 1838 as governor-general. The ailing Durham retired at the end of the year, and Kennedy travelled in America, sending to London a municipal report on Canadian institutions, which was printed for parliamentary use. He was for some months in the Republic of Texas, and returning to England at the end of 1839 became an advocate for its interests. He criticised Daniel O'Connell's suggestion that the independent Texas should be recognised only with the consent of Mexico. In December 1841 he went as British consul to Galveston.

In 1847 Kennedy returned to the United Kingdom, in poor health. In 1849 he retired on a pension, first to the neighbourhood of London, and then to Paris, where he was an invalid until his death in 1871.

== Works ==
After an early story My Early Days, Kennedy won a reputation in 1827 with Fitful Fancies,’ a collection of short poems. In 1830 appeared The Arrow and the Rose, and other Poems, his best-known work. There followed The Continental Annual and Romantic Cabinet for 1832, London, 1831, and The Siege of Antwerp, an historical play, London, 1838. Many of Kennedy's lyrics are in Whistle Binkie.

In 1841 Kennedy published, in two volumes, with an autobiographical preface, The Rise, Progress, and Prospects of the Republic of Texas.

== Notes ==
Attribution

This article incorporates text from a publication now in the public domain: Lee, Sidney, ed. (1892). "Kennedy, William (1799-1871)". Dictionary of National Biography. Vol. 30. London: Smith, Elder & Co.
