= Robert Balmer =

Scottish clergyman (1787-1844)

Personal details
- Born: 1787
- Died: 1844 (aged 56–57)
- Denomination: (1) Burgher Seceder; (2) New Licht Burgher Seceder; (3) New Licht United Secession Church
- Occupation: Minister

Robert Balmer (1787–1844), was successively a minister of the Burgher Seceder, New Licht Burgher Seceder and United Associate Synod of the Secession Churches in Scotland.

Balmer was born at Ormiston Mains, in the parish of Eckford, Roxburghshire on 22 November 1787. He evinced considerable abilities and a disposition towards the Christian ministry. He entered the University of Edinburgh in 1802, and in 1806 the Theological Hall at Selkirk, under George Lawson of the Secession Church. In 1812 he received licence as a preacher from the Presbytery of Edinburgh, and in 1814 was ordained minister in Berwick-upon-Tweed, where he remained till his death. In 1834 he became a professor of pastoral theology at the United Secession church, and later a professor of systematic theology. In 1840 he received a D.D. from the University of Glasgow.

Balmer had great influence in the denomination to which he belonged. When certain discussions arose among his brethren on some Calvinistic doctrines, he supported the less stringent views. At a meeting held in Edinburgh in 1843, to commemorate the bicentennial of the Westminster Assembly, he delivered a speech in favour of Christian union, which attracted the attention of Thomas Chalmers and others, and led to important measures being taken by John Henderson of Park for promoting that cause. Balmer did not publish much during his life but two volumes of Lectures and Discourses were posthumously published in 1845, a year after he died on 1 July 1844.

Academic offices
Preceded by John Dick as Professor of Theology of the United; Secession Church	Professor of Systematic Theology of the United Secession Church; 1833–1844	Succeeded by "Harper, James" . Dictionary of National Biography. 1885–1900.
