= North Buxton =

- dispersed rural community
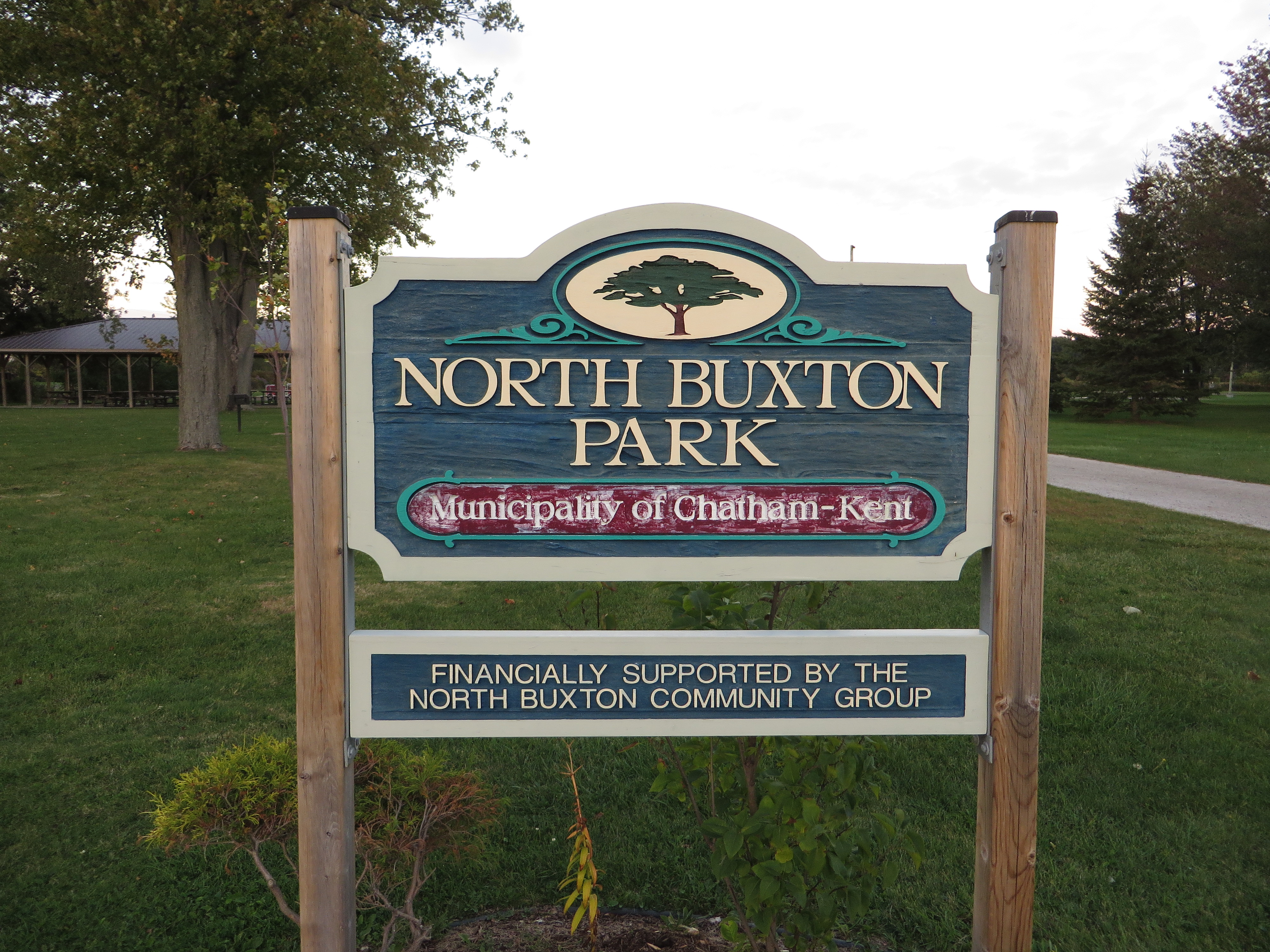

- Location within Municipality of Chatham-Kent Location within Southern Ontario
- Coordinates: 42°18′37″N 82°13′30″W
- Country: Canada
- Province: Ontario
- Region: Southwestern Ontario
- Municipality: Chatham-Kent
- Established: 1849
- Time zone: UTC-5 (EST)
  - Summer (DST): UTC-4 (EDT)
- Postal Code: N0P 1Y0
- Area codes: 519, 226, 548

North Buxton is a dispersed rural community located in Southwestern Ontario, Canada. It was established in 1849 as a community for and by former African-American slaves who escaped to Canada to gain freedom. Rev. William King, a Scots-Irish/American Presbyterian minister and abolitionist, had organized the Elgin Association to buy 9,000 acres of land for resettlement of the refugees, to give them a start in Canada. Within a few years, numerous families were living here, having cleared land, built houses, and developed crops. They established schools and churches, and were thriving before the American Civil War.

There was great interest in the settlement among Americans. Buxton was visited by a reporter from the New York Herald Tribune in 1857, and by the head of the American Freedmen's Inquiry Commission in the summer of 1863, established after President Abraham Lincoln's Emancipation Proclamation had freed many enslaved people in the American South during the Civil War. The resultant reports praised the achievements of the people of Buxton and other African Americans in Canada.

The community is within the Chatham-Kent municipality, at the junction of Chatham-Kent Roads 6 and 14. Its population in the early 21st century is approximately 250, over half of whom are black Canadians. North Buxton's historic population peaked at more than 2000, almost exclusively descendants of free black people and fugitive slaves who had escaped the United States via the Underground Railroad. Upper Canada (now known as the Province of Ontario) was the first British colony to abolish slavery, in 1793. Though slavery had never been widespread in Canada, Great Britain abolished slavery in its colonies in 1838. The related community is South Buxton.

== History ==
The North Buxton community was established in 1849 by Rev. William King, a Scots-Irish/American abolitionist. He had emigrated from Scotland to the United States as a young man, worked as a teacher and tutor to planters' families for years in Louisiana, and married into a planter family. After his wife died, he inherited her estate, including 15 slaves. He initially allowed the slaves to keep fees earned after being hired out. After becoming a Presbyterian minister and missionary in Canada, King decided to free his slaves and relocate them to that free country.

He worked with the Governor General, Lord Elgin, to create the Elgin Association, to manage development of a 9,000-acre parcel near Lake Erie for a community where freedmen and fugitive slaves, known as Negro refugees in Canada, might settle. The Elgin Settlement eventually was organized as the communities of North and South Buxton. The Association provided land at low cost, and financing for those who would build a house and develop the land, to aid the African Americans.

In the years before the American Civil War, these refugee enslaved people usually reached Canada via the Underground Railroad from the United States. Thousands had been settling in Southwest Ontario, as it was easily reached from a number of midwestern states and Western New York. Among the notable residents was William Parker, a leader of the Christiana Resistance in 1851 in the free state of Pennsylvania, where he and his neighbors fought off a party trying to capture four fugitive slaves from Maryland. From Buxton, he became a correspondent of Frederick Douglass' newspaper, The North Star. He was active in the community and was elected to local office for many years.

The growing population was visited by Americans, in addition to Canadians interested in its progress. A reporter from the New York Herald Tribune wrote admiringly about it in 1857. During the late years of the American Civil War, after the Emancipation Proclamation in early 1863 freed many enslaved peoples in the South, a Freedmen's Inquiry Commission was established by the Secretary of War to gather information about the "condition and capacity" of the "population just set free." On its behalf, Dr. Samuel Gridley Howe and J.M.W. Yerrinton, as secretary and reporter, visited numerous communities in Canada West (present-day Ontario) during the summer of 1863 to gather information about the many former American slaves who had gained freedom and settled there. Among those communities was Buxton.

He wrote,

Buxton is certainly a very interesting place. Sixteen years ago it was a wilderness ... Twenty years ago most of them [inhabitants] were slaves, who owned nothing, not even their children. Now they own themselves; they own their houses and farms; they have their wives and children about them. They are the enfranchised citizens of a government that protects their rights ... The present condition of all these colonists as compared with their former one is remarkable ... This settlement is a perfect success ...

In the 1860s, there was a fire at their local pearlash factory. As the bell rang to warn the citizens, many men gathered to stop the fire, but the factory could not be saved. Thus, a source of income was lost from the community. However, Buxton was doing well in other aspects and managed to stick through the situation.

In the nineteenth century, the community operated three schools; the former enslaved people placed emphasis on education and literacy for adults and children as the key to progress. Its education was considered so good that nearby white people sent their children to attend these schools. Over time, descendants have moved from these rural communities to cities for urban opportunities, and the population has declined.

== Legacy ==
- The Buxton National Historic Site and Museum is dedicated to the African Americans and their black Canadian descendants, who found freedom in Canada via the Underground Railroad. The museum complex includes a historic schoolhouse, residence and barn.

== Representation in popular culture ==
- American writer Christopher Paul Curtis wrote three children's novels known as the Buxton Chronicles and set in Buxton. Elijah of Buxton. (2007) is set there just before the American Civil War.
- Curtis's The Madman of Piney Woods (2014), is set in Buxton and nearby Chatham in 1901. It features Benji, a black Canadian boy from Buxton, and Red, an ethnic Irish boy from nearby Chatham.
- Curtis's The Journey of Little Charlie (2018) also extends to Buxton. Twelve-year-old Charlie helps an overseer recapture some enslaved people who escaped from a South Carolina plantation. They go to Canada as part of their search and almost succeed in capturing a black boy named Sylvanus, but when the train stops in Buxton, an angry mob of black and white Canadians prevents them from taking Sylvanus.
- The North Star: Finding Black Mecca (2021), a film about Chatham-Kent's black communities and history is partly filmed in North Buxton.
