= South Buxton, Ontario =

South Buxton
- Unincorporated community
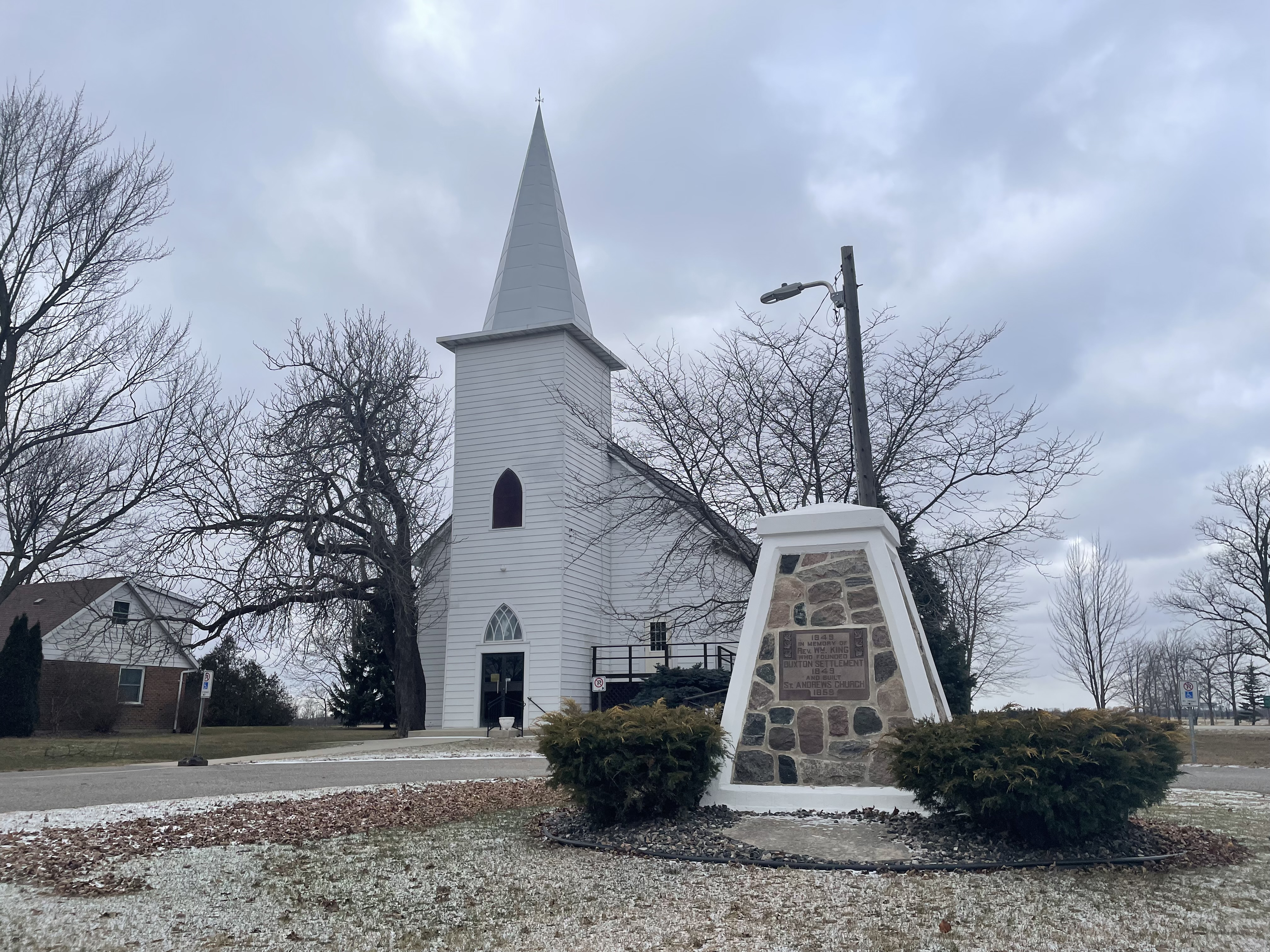
- St. Andrew's United Church and Commemorative Cairn

- Location within Municipality of Chatham-Kent Location within Southern Ontario
- Coordinates: 42°16′27″N 82°10′56″W
- Country: Canada
- Province: Ontario
- Municipality: Chatham-Kent
- Founded: 1849
- Founder: William King
- Time zone: UTC-5 (EST)
  - Summer (DST): UTC-4 (EDT)
- Forward sortation area: 1W0
- Area codes: 519 and 226
- NTS Map: 040J08
- GNBC Code: FCQGT

South Buxton is an unincorporated community in Chatham-Kent, Ontario, Canada. The population is approximately 78. The majority of the population is retirees. South Buxton has only three roads and a single church. It is near the South Buxton raceway. The closest towns are North Buxton and Merlin.

== History ==
South Buxton was founded in 1849 by the Elgin Association, organized by Rev. William King with support from the Governor General of Canada, Lord Elgin. A neighbouring community with larger population, once the major part of what was called the Elgin Settlement, is North Buxton.

Born in Derry, Rev. William King had immigrated to the United States and worked as a tutor and teacher for years in Louisiana, where he married into a planter family and eventually inherited 15 slaves. He had become a Presbyterian minister and was assigned as a missionary to Canada. He was assisted by the Scot, Rev Michael Willis who gave the first communion to the slaves in the church.

He gained support from Lord Elgin in order to obtain land for resettlement of his 15 freed slaves. He also wanted to provide for any fugitive slaves, known as Negro refugees, who usually reached Canada by means of the Underground Railroad. In the 1840s and 1850s, they arrived in Canada by the thousands, and settled mostly in Ontario.

Despite early resistance from nearby residents, the Elgin Association purchased 9,000 acres of land, which it divided into 50-acre farms. These were intended to be the basis of subsistence farming. The town grew quickly, with 400 residents after 3 years, and more than 800 residents after 7 years, as African-American refugees continued to reach Canada via the Underground Railroad.

The church, St. Andrew's, was built by the community for Rev. William King. A liberty bell, cast in 1800, was used to signal the beginning of church service until the 21st century. Before the American Civil War, the bell was also rung every time a self-liberated slave reached South Buxton. The residents also built Baptist and Methodist churches in North Buxton. Both communities had much higher populations before the urbanization of Ontario drew off rural people into towns and cities for work.

== Legacy ==
- The Buxton National Historic Site and Museum in North Buxton is dedicated to the African-American refugees and their Black Canadian descendants, who found freedom in Canada via the Underground Railroad. The museum complex includes an historic residence and barn.

== Representation in popular culture ==
- Christopher Paul Curtis wrote a youth novel set in historic Buxton (in the years just before the American Civil War) entitled, Elijah of Buxton (2007).
- Curtis' youth novel, The Madman of Piney Woods, features Benji, a Black Canadian boy from Buxton, and Red, an ethnic Irish boy from nearby Chatham.
