= Michael Willis (minister) =

Scottish Presbyterian minister (1695–1761)

Personal details
- Born: 1799 Scotland
- Died: 1879 (aged 79–80) Aberlour
- Denomination: (1) Old Light Burgher (2) Church of Scotland (3) Free Church (4) Presbyterian Church in Canada

1st Principal of Knox College, Toronto
- In office 1857–1870
- President: John McCaul
- Preceded by: Position established
- Succeeded by: William Caven

Michael Willis (1799-1879) was a Scottish minister of the Free Church of Scotland who emigrated to Canada and became the first principal of Knox College, Toronto. A prominent campaigner for the abolition of slavery he was involved in the Canadian end of the Underground Railway. He was Moderator of the General Assembly for the Presbyterian Church of Canada in 1870.

== Early life ==
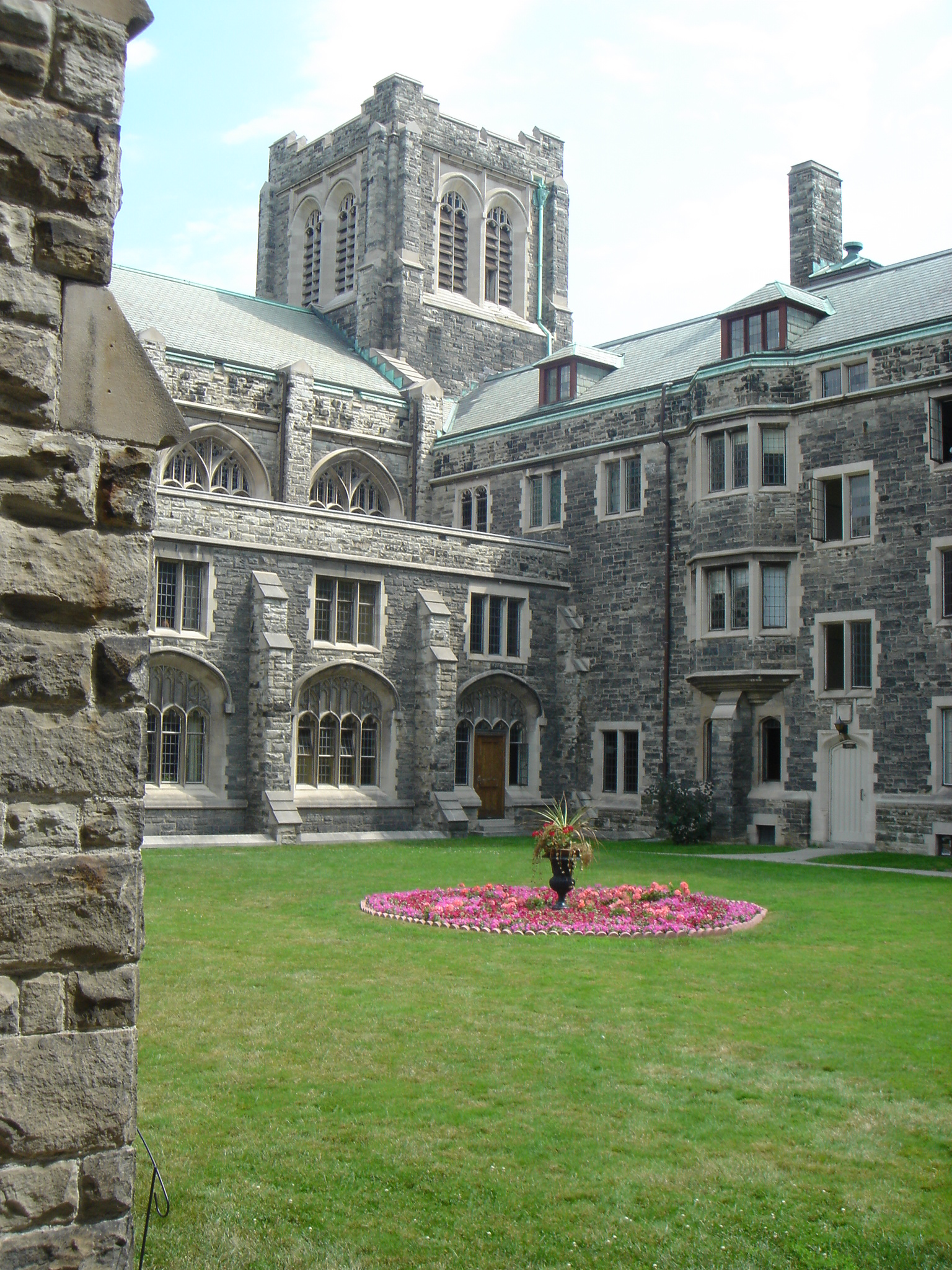
Knox College

Willis was born in Greenock in western central Scotland in 1798 or 1799. He was the son of Rev William Willis of Stirling (died 1827), a minister of the Old Light Burghers, a Secessionist church. He grew up and was educated in Stirling. He studied at Glasgow University and the Divinity Hall in Glasgow, with further training as a Secessionist minister at the Burgher Synod.

== Ministry in Scotland ==
In 1821 he was ordained at the Secessionist Church at Albion Street in the Merchant City in Glasgow.

From 1835 he took on the additional role as Professor of Theology at Divinity Hall.

In 1839, as part of a wider absorption of the Secessionist Church, he became a minister of the Church of Scotland, also being one of the leading organisers of this union. He was then moved to Renfield Street Church. This association proved to be brief and in the Disruption of 1843 he left the established church and joined the Free Church of Scotland.

== Ministry in Canada ==
He was sent to Canada in 1845 to spread the views of the Free Church. In 1847 he was appointed Professor of Theology at Knox College, Toronto. In 1857, the college not having previously been fully organised, he was elected as its first principal. He was instrumental in creating the college constitution which aims to further the Calvinist ideals within Christianity.

From 1851 he was the first (and only) President of the Anti-Slavery Society of Canada. This was highly involved in the rescue and sanctuary end of the so-called "Underground Railway" which helped many thousands of slaves escape America to find safety in Canada. In this process he befriended and aided Rev William King and was noteworthy for giving the very first communion to a group of fugitive negro slaves arrived at their mission church at Buxton in Ontario.

Queen's University, Kingston awarded him an honorary doctorate (LLD) in 1863.

In 1870 he stood down as both Professor and Principal of Knox College. He was in the same year elected the first Moderator of the General Assembly of the Presbyterian Church of Canada. In this he replaced Rev William Ormiston who had done much of the work in establishing the church formally and organising its first Synod.

He retired to London but spent much time as a guest preacher in Scotland.

He died on 18 August 1879 whilst preaching for an old friend at Aberlour near Banff in northern Scotland.

== Publications ==
- Discourse on National Establishments of Christianity (1833)
- The Late Union between the Church of Scotland and the Associate Synod (1840)
- Slavery Indefensible (1847)
- Selections from the Greek and Latin Fathers (1865)
- Pulpit Discourses (1873)

Academic offices
Preceded by William Taylor	Professor of Theology and Biblical Criticism of the 'Old Light' Burgher Secession Church in Scotland; 1835-1839	Office abolished due to union with the Church of Scotland
