= Leitch Ritchie =

British writer

Leitch Ritchie (1800–1865) was a Scottish novelist and journalist. He was born at Greenock and worked as a clerk in Glasgow, but about 1820 adopted literature as his profession.

Ritchie wrote four novels, of which the most successful was Wearyfoot Common. The others were Schinderhannes, The Robber of the Rhine and The Magician. In his later years he edited Chambers' Journal. He also wrote short stories, including one of the first British werewolf short stories The Man-Wolf (1831). Ritchie also wrote non-fiction works, such as travel books.

== Life ==
Ritchie was at first an apprentice in a banking office, but at an early age went to London with letters of introduction to literary people. Called back by his father, to take up a position in a Glasgow trading firm, he started in 1818, with some friends, a fortnightly publication, The Wanderers, which ran to 21 numbers (4 April 1818 to 9 January 1819). The Glasgow firm became bankrupt, and Ritchie again went to London.

Working as a professional writer, Ritchie sent articles to the Foreign Quarterly Review, the Westminster Review, and other periodicals. The London Weekly Review, on which he had been employed, passed into other hands, he and the former editor, James Augustus St. John, went to live in Normandy. Books made his reputation, and from this period he had enough work. In addition to his other engagements, he with William Kennedy, started a monthly periodical, The Englishman's Magazine, which ran to seven numbers (April to October 1831), when his own illness caused its abandonment.

For some time Ritchie was editor of The Era, a sporting and dramatic newspaper, and was subsequently first editor of the Indian News and Chronicle of Eastern Affairs (No. 1, 11 June 1840), the copyright of which he was eventually given by the proprietor; and he later sold the newspaper. The latter part of his working life was spent in Scotland in editing Chambers's Journal, and other publications by his employers. During this period (the 1850s) he lived at 29 St Bernards Crescent in Stockbridge, Edinburgh where he befriended his near neighbour, Andrew Crichton, of 33 St Bernard's Crescent.

On 19 June 1862 Ritchie was granted a civil list pension. Retiring to London, he died at 1 Earlswood Terrace, East Greenwich, on 16 January 1865. He left a daughter, Mrs. Hughes, who resided at Perry Green, Hertfordshire.

== Works ==
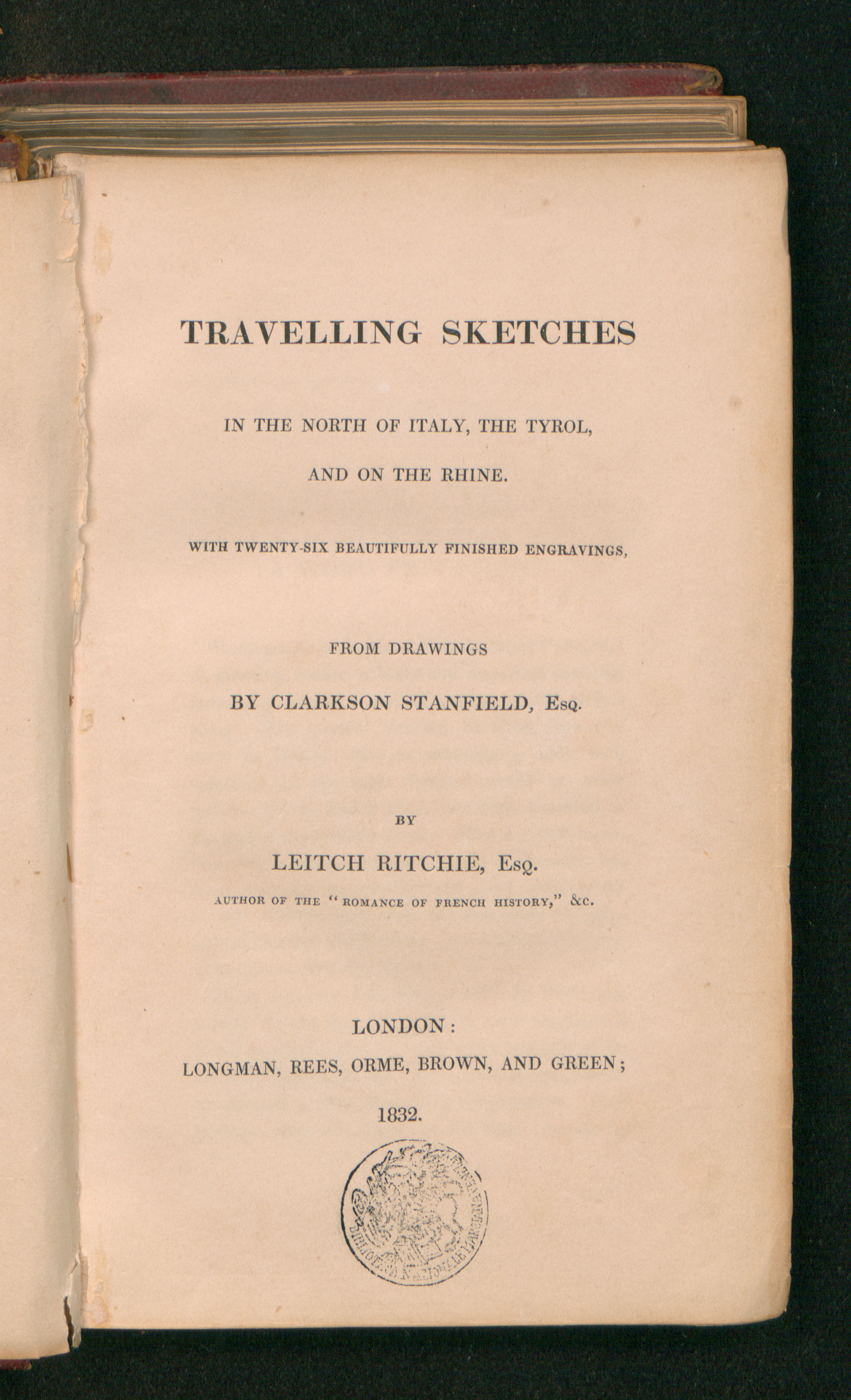
Travelling sketches in the north of Italy, the Tyrol, and on the Rhine (1832)

While contributing to periodicals in his early days in London, Ritchie brought out a volume entitled Head Pieces and Tail Pieces, by a Travelling Artist, 1820. He published also Tales and Confessions, 1829, and London Night Entertainments. Based in France, Ritchie produced The Game of Speculation, 1830, 2 vols. (reprinted in the "Parlour Library", No. 58, 1851), and The Romance of History, France, 1831, 3 vols.; 2nd edit. 1872.

Charles Heath commissioned Ritchie to write two series of books of travels: Turner's Annual Tour, 1833–5, and Heath's Picturesque Annual, 1832–45. He visited many places abroad, and the result was twelve illustrated volumes to which he supplied the letterpress. He edited the "Library of Romance", 1833–5, in 15 vols.

Ritchie was also the author of:

- Schinderhannes, the Robber of the Rhine, printed in the "Library of Romance", No. 2, 1833; reprinted in the "Parlour Library", No. xiii. 1848, and as a separate volume 1878.
- The sea-wolf, printed in the "Library of Romance", Vol. XI, 1834.
- The Magician, 1836, 3 vols.; reprinted in the "Parlour Novelist", 1846, and in the "Parlour Library", 1853.
- Beauty's Costumes, a Series of Female Figures in the Dresses of all Times, by Charles Heath, with descriptions by L. Ritchie, 1838.
- The Wye and its Associations: a Picturesque Ramble, 1841.
- A View of the Opium Trade, Historical, Moral, and Commercial, 1843.
- The British World in the East, 1847, 2 vols.
- Windsor Castle and its Environs, including Eton College; 2nd edit. 1848.
- Liber Fluviorum, or River Scenery of France, from Drawings by J. M. Turner, with descriptive letterpress by L. Ritchie, 1853; another edit. 1887.
- Wearyfoot Common, 1855. This novel is available on kindle, but is also available free to download in Chambers Journal, 1956, in 23 instalments.
- The New Shilling, 1857.
- Winter Evenings, 1859, 2 vols.
- The Midnight Journey, by L. Ritchie, and other Tales, by Mrs. Crowe and others; reprinted from Chambers's Journal, 1871.

He edited Friendship's Offering, 1824, and The Poetical Works of Thomas Pringle, 1838 (2nd edit. 1839), with a sketch of Thomas Pringle's life.
