= Buxton National Historic Site and Museum =

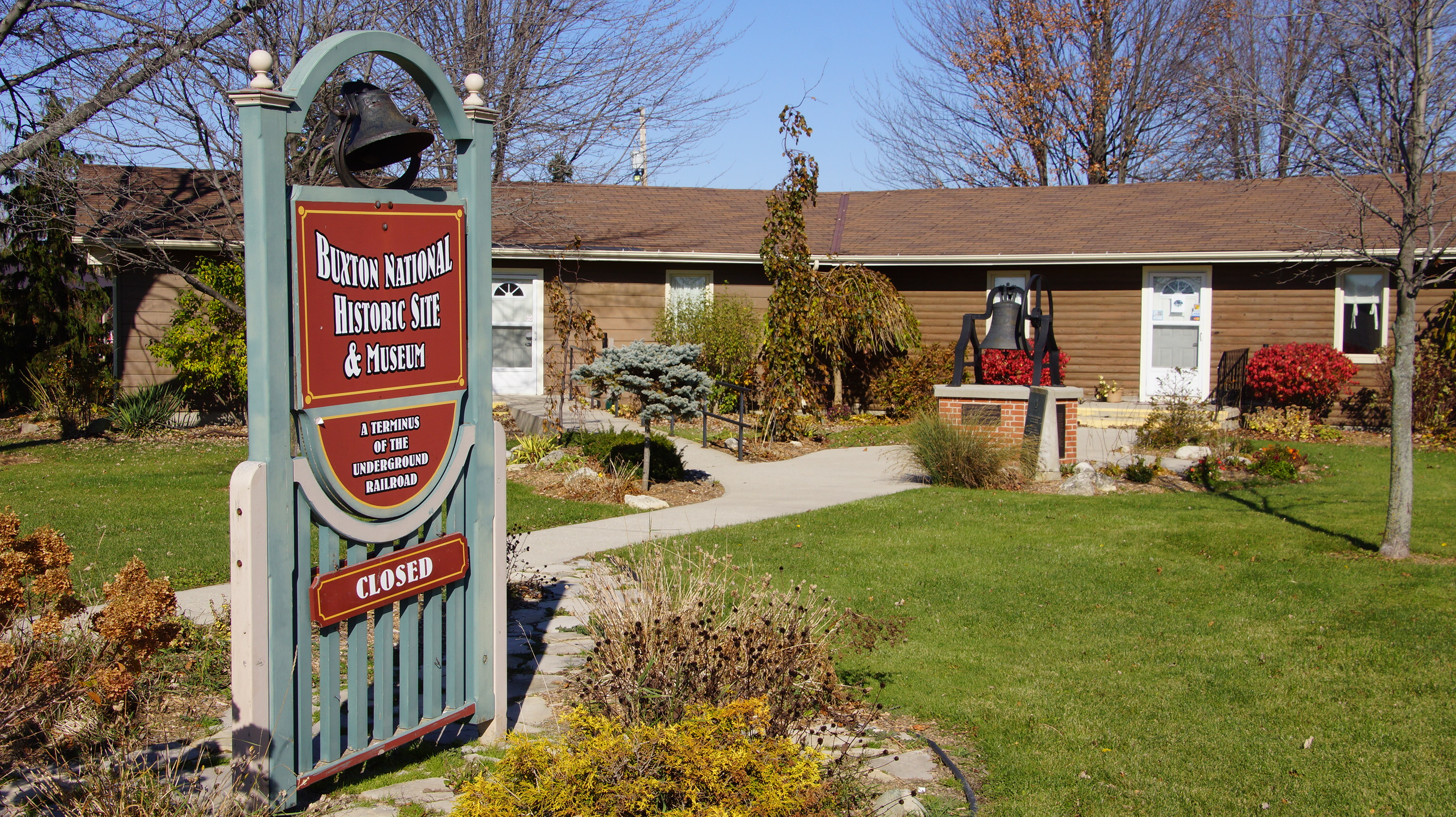
- Bell at Buxton National Historic Site and Museum

- Location within Ontario
- 42°18′20.4″N 82°13′13.5″W
- Location: North Buxton, Ontario, Canada

History
- Built: 1849

Site notes
- Area: 9,000 acres (36 km^{2})
- Governing body: Parks Canada
- Website: Buxton Museum Official Webpage

National Historic Site of Canada

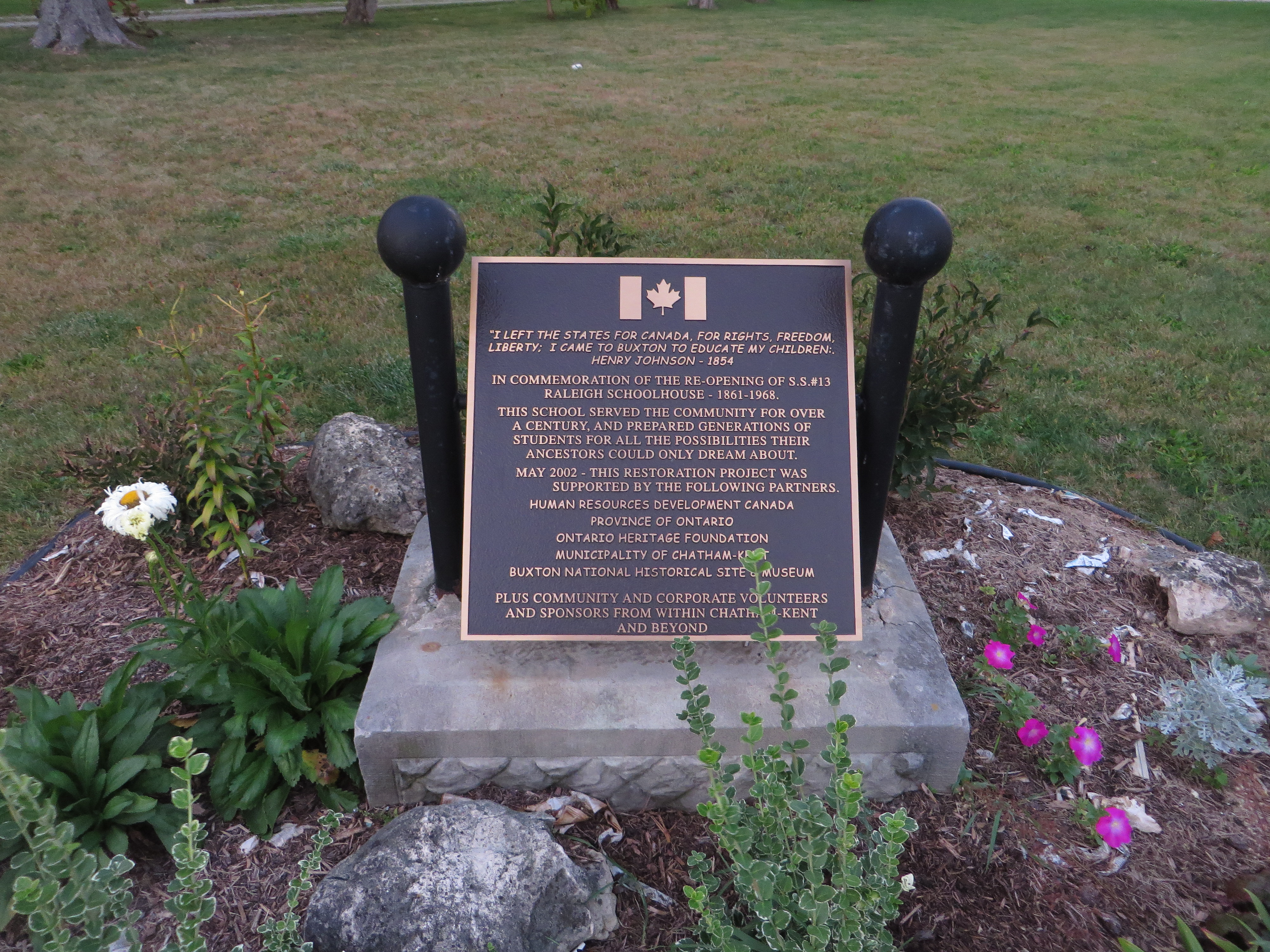
Buxton National Historic Site and Museum, South Buxton, Ontario

The Buxton National Historic Site and Museum is a tribute to the Elgin Settlement (also known as the Buxton Mission, Raleigh, Kent County), established in 1849 by Reverend William King (1812–1895), and an association which included Lord Elgin, then the Governor General of Canada. King, a former slave owner turned abolitionist, purchased 9,000 acres (36 km^{2}) of crown land in Southwestern Ontario and created a haven for fugitive slaves and free Blacks.It was also a terminus on the Underground Railroad from the United States.

The Elgin settlement was divided into 50-acre (200,000 m^{2}) lots which could only be purchased by Black settlers. Black settlers had 10 years to pay for their property, and houses were built to minimum standards. By 1864, there was a steam grist mill, steam saw-mill, shoe shop, two general stores, a blacksmith, cooperage, school with forty students on average, and a church (24 by 32 feet (7.3 m × 9.8 m)) seating 200.

The need for the mission was considered no longer and the Buxton Mission Fund was closed by 1865 when 'the liberty of the slaves was proclaimed' at the end of the American Civil War.

Opened in 1967, the museum complex includes the main building with exhibits about the community and its history, an 1861 schoolhouse, an 1854 log cabin, and a barn. Local historic church cemeteries are adjacent to the museum. The museum is located in North Buxton, Ontario, near South Buxton in Chatham-Kent. It was designated as a National Historic Site of Canada in 1999.

== See also ==
- Anna Maria Weems (ca. 1840 – after 1863), an enslaved teenager who dressed as a male carriage driver and escaped to Canada where she was a student of the Buxton Mission School.
- James T. Rapier (1837–1883), student and teacher at the Buxton Mission School
- Indigenous Black Canadians
- Chatham Vigilance Committee
- Uncle Tom's Cabin Historic Site, a historic site built on the Dawn settlement, another former slave settlement in Ontario.
- List of museums in Ontario
