= Thomas Wilson (lexicographer) =

Thomas Wilson (1563–1622) was an English Anglican priest, known as the compiler of an early biblical reference work.

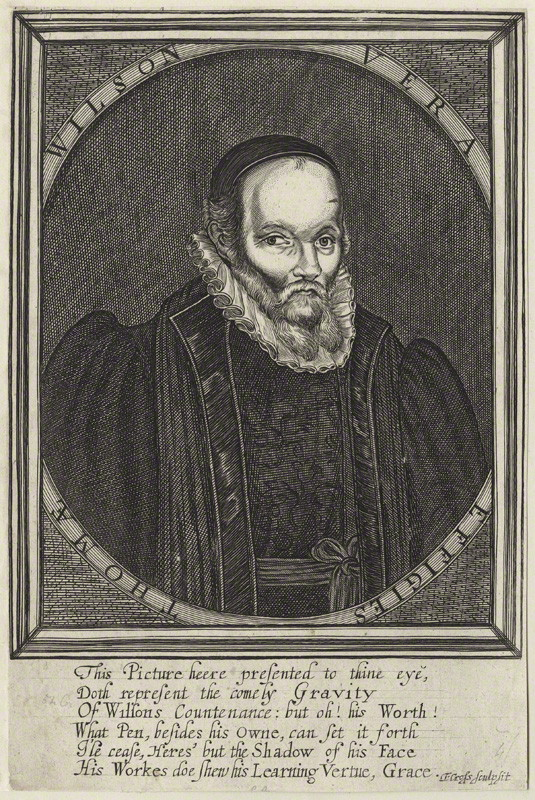
Thomas Wilson

== Life ==
Born in County Durham, Wilson matriculated at The Queen's College, Oxford on 17 November 1581, aged 18. He graduated B.A. on 7 February 1584, and was licensed M.A. on 7 July 1586. He was elected chaplain of the college, apparently before he was ordained, on 24 April 1585.

In July 1586 Wilson was appointed rector of St. George the Martyr, Canterbury through the influence of Henry Robinson, to whom he had owed his college education. He remained at Canterbury for the rest of his life, preaching three or four sermons every week, and popular with Puritans, but complained of by others to Archbishop George Abbot for nonconformity. He was acting as chaplain to Thomas Wotton in 1611.

Wilson died at Canterbury in January 1622, and was buried in his own churchyard, outside the chancel, on the 25th. A funeral sermon was preached by William Swift of St. Andrew's, Canterbury. He was married and left a large family.

== Works ==
Wilson's major work was his Christian Dictionarie (London, 1612), one of the earliest attempts made at a concordance of the Bible in English. It ran through many editions. The fourth was enlarged by John Bagwell (n.d., London); the fifth appeared in 1647; the sixth (1655) was further expanded by Andrew Symson.

His Commentarie on the Epistle to the Romans (1614), written in the form of a dialogue between Timotheus and Silas, took Wilson seven years to write. It was reprinted in 1627, and reached a third edition in 1653. In 1611 he published a volume containing Jacob's Ladder; or, a short Treatise laying forth the severall Degrees of Gods Eternall Purpose, A Dialogue about Jvstification by Faith, A Receit against Heresie, and two sermons. With other sermons, and works apparently lost, he wrote Saints by Calling; or, Called to be Saints, London, 1620.

== Notes ==
Attribution

- This article incorporates text from a publication now in the public domain: Lee, Sidney, ed. (1900). "Wilson, Thomas (1563-1622)". Dictionary of National Biography. Vol. 62. London: Smith, Elder & Co.
