= Indigenous Black Canadians =

Indigenous Black Canadians is a term used to describe people of African descent in Canada whose families have lived in the country for several generations. Statistics Canada categorizes this group as "third generation or more" Black Canadians. In 2016, 103,225 individuals identified as such.

The expression is commonly used to distinguish these historic communities from Black Canadians whose roots lie in more recent immigration from Africa and the Caribbean. In practice, it is most often associated with African Nova Scotians, whose ancestry traces back to Black Loyalists, Jamaican Maroons, and Black refugees of the War of 1812, as well as with descendants of Underground Railroad communities in Ontario.

The term gained wider use in the 1970s, when new immigration from the Caribbean and Africa prompted scholars and activists such as Rinaldo Walcott, Walter Borden, George Elliott Clarke, and Rocky Jones to emphasize the distinct histories of long-established Black Canadian communities. Alternatives such as "historic Black communities", "long-established Black Canadians", or "foundational Black Canadians" are also used to avoid confusion with Afro-Indigenous people.

== See also ==
- North Buxton, Ontario
- Amber Valley, Alberta
- Hogan's Alley, Vancouver
- Elm Hill, New Brunswick
- Africville
- African Nova Scotians
