= John Brown of Haddington =

Scottish minister and author (1722–1787)

John Brown
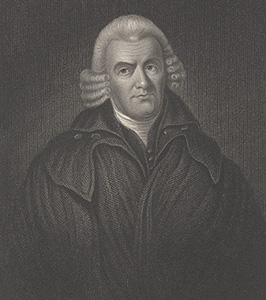
- Born: 1722; Carpow, Scotland
- Died: 19 June 1787 (aged 64–65); Haddington, East Lothian, Scotland
- Occupations: Shepherd; herd-boy; travelling merchant; soldier; school-master; minister; author; theologian
- Notable work: "The Self-Interpreting Bible", "The Dictionary of the Bible", and "A General History of the Christian Church"
- Children: 6
- Theological work
- Tradition or movement: Burgher Seceder

John Brown of Haddington (1722 – 19 June 1787) was a Scottish minister and author. He was born at Carpow, in Perthshire. He was almost entirely self-educated, having acquired a knowledge of ancient languages while employed as a shepherd. By his own intense application to study, before he was twenty years of age, he had obtained an intimate knowledge of the Latin, Greek, and Hebrew languages, with the last of which he was critically conversant. He was also acquainted with the French, Italian, German, Arabic, Persian, Syriac, and Ethiopic. His early career was varied, and he was in succession a travelling merchant, a soldier in the Edinburgh garrison in 1745, and a school-master. He was, from 1750 till his death, minister of the Burgher branch of the Secession Church in Haddington. From 1768 he was professor of divinity for his denomination, and was mainly responsible for the training of its ministers. He gained a just reputation for learning and piety. The best of his many works are his Self-Interpreting Bible and Dictionary of the Bible, works that were long very popular. The former was translated into Welsh. He also wrote an Explication of the Westminster Confession, and a number of biographical and historical sketches.

== Early life ==
John Brown was born at Carpow in the parish of Abernethy, in Perthshire, Scotland, the son of a self-educated weaver and river-fisherman, also called John Brown. His mother was Catherine Millie. His parents had morning and evening worship at home. His father was a poor weaver, who could only afford to send him to school for a few 'quarters.' During one month of this time he studied Latin. Even at this early period he learnt eagerly, getting up by heart 'Vincent's and Havel's Catechisms, and the Assembly's Larger Catechism.' When he was eleven his father died. His mother did not long survive. He himself was brought so low by 'four fevers on end' that his recovery was despaired of.

Having recovered from this illness, Brown befriended John Ogilvie, a shepherd who fed his flock among the neighbouring mountains. Ogilvie was an elder of the parish of Abernethy. Ogilvie assisted Brown in tending his flock and they built a cabin together.

Ogilvie later retired and settled in the town of Abernethy, leading to Brown working for a neighbouring farmer as a herd-boy. Brown fell ill again with a fever in 1741.

== Secession in the Church of Scotland ==
Timeline showing the evolution of the churches of Scotland from 1560

In the year 1733, four ministers of the Church of Scotland, among whom was Mr Moncrieff of Abernethy, declared a secession from its judicatures, alleging as their reasons for taking this step the following list of grievances; "The sufferance of error without adequate censure; the infringement of the rights of the Christian people in the choice and settlement of ministers under the law of patronage; the neglect or relaxation of discipline; the restraint of ministerial freedom in opposing mal-administration, and the refusal of the prevailing party to be reclaimed." To this body our young shepherd early attached himself; and ventured to conceive the idea of one day becoming a shepherd of souls in that connection. He accordingly prosecuted his studies with increasing ardour and diligence, and began to attain considerable knowledge of Latin and Greek. These acquisitions he made entirely without aid from others, except that he was able occasionally to snatch an hour when the flocks were folded at noon, in order to seek the solution of such difficulties as his unaided efforts could not master, from two neighbouring clergymen the one Mr Moncrieff of Abernethy, who has just been mentioned as one of the founders of the Secession, and the other Mr Johnston of Arngask, father of the late venerable Dr Johnston of North-Leith; both of whom were very obliging and communicative, and took great interest in promoting the progress of the studious shepherd-boy.

During his life as a herd-boy he studied eagerly. He acquired a good knowledge of Latin, Greek, and Hebrew. His difficulties in regard to the second of those were very great, for he could not for some time get a grammar. Notwithstanding this, he managed by the exercise of patient ingenuity to learn the letters on a method he afterwards described in detail (paper of 6 Aug. 1745 quoted in Biography), He scraped together the price of a Greek testament, and a well-known story describes how he procured it. A companion agreed to take charge of his sheep for a little, so setting out at midnight, he reached St. Andrews, twenty-four miles distant, in the morning. The bookseller questioned the shepherd-boy, and Francis Pringle, a professor of Greek happened to hear the conversation. 'Boy,' said he, pointing to a passage, 'read this, and you shall have the book for nothing.' Brown read the passage,, got the volume, and walked home again with it (Memoir, p. 29; Dr. John Brown's Letter to John Cairns, D.D., p. 73).

Before he was twenty years of age, he had obtained an intimate knowledge of the Latin, Greek, and Hebrew languages, with the last of which he was critically conversant. He was also acquainted with the French, Italian, German, Arabic, Persian, Syriac, and Ethiopic. The herd-boy and his learning now became the subject of talk in the place. Some 'seceding students' accounted for the wonder by explaining that Brown had got his knowledge from Satan. The hypothesis was widely accepted, nor was it till some years had died that he was able by his blameless and diligent life to 'live it down.' He afterwards took occasion to note that just when he was 'licensed' his 'primary calumniator' was excommunicated for immoral conduct.

== Early career ==
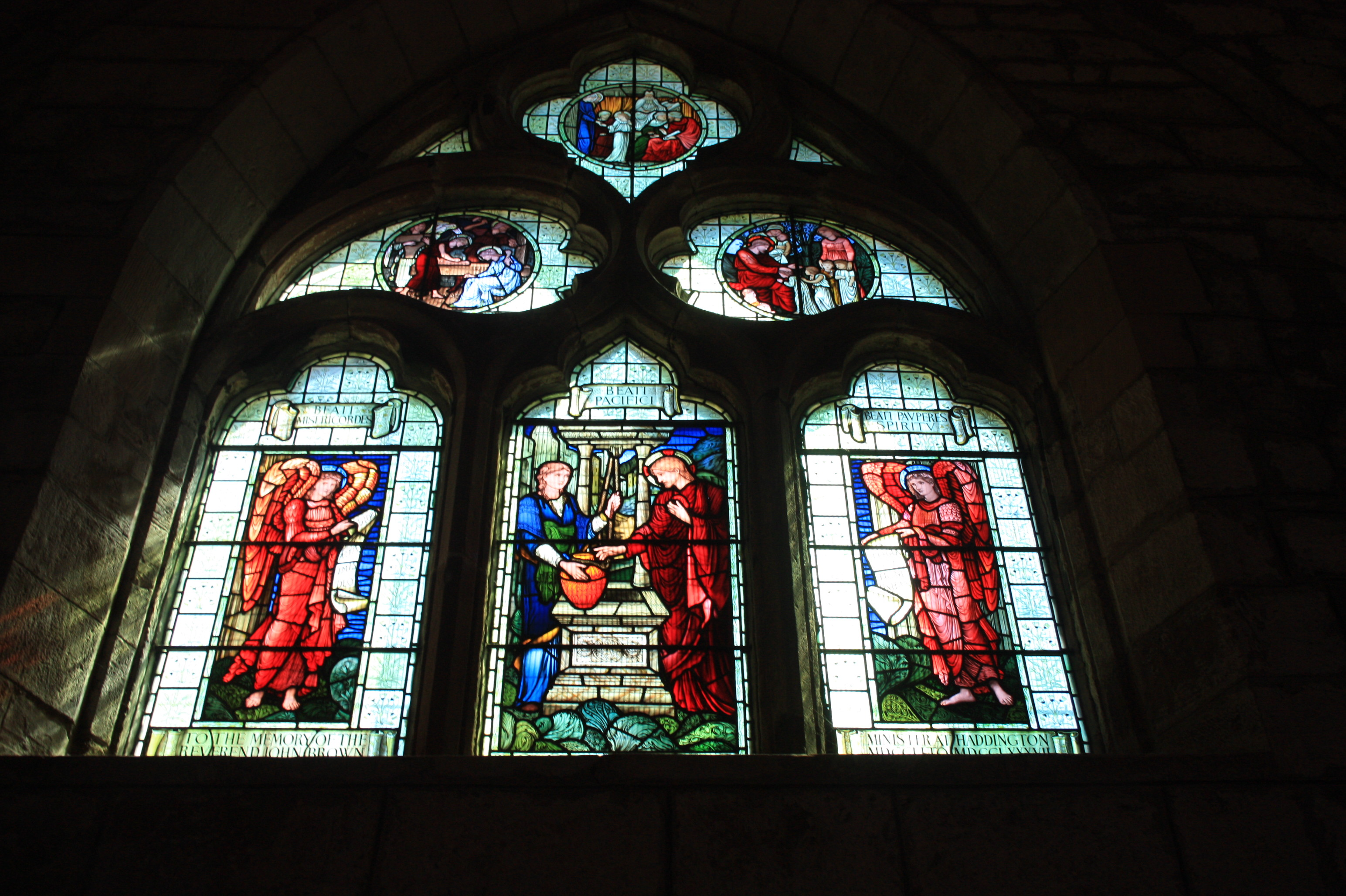
Memorial window to Rev John Brown, St Marys, Haddington, by Edward Burne-Jones

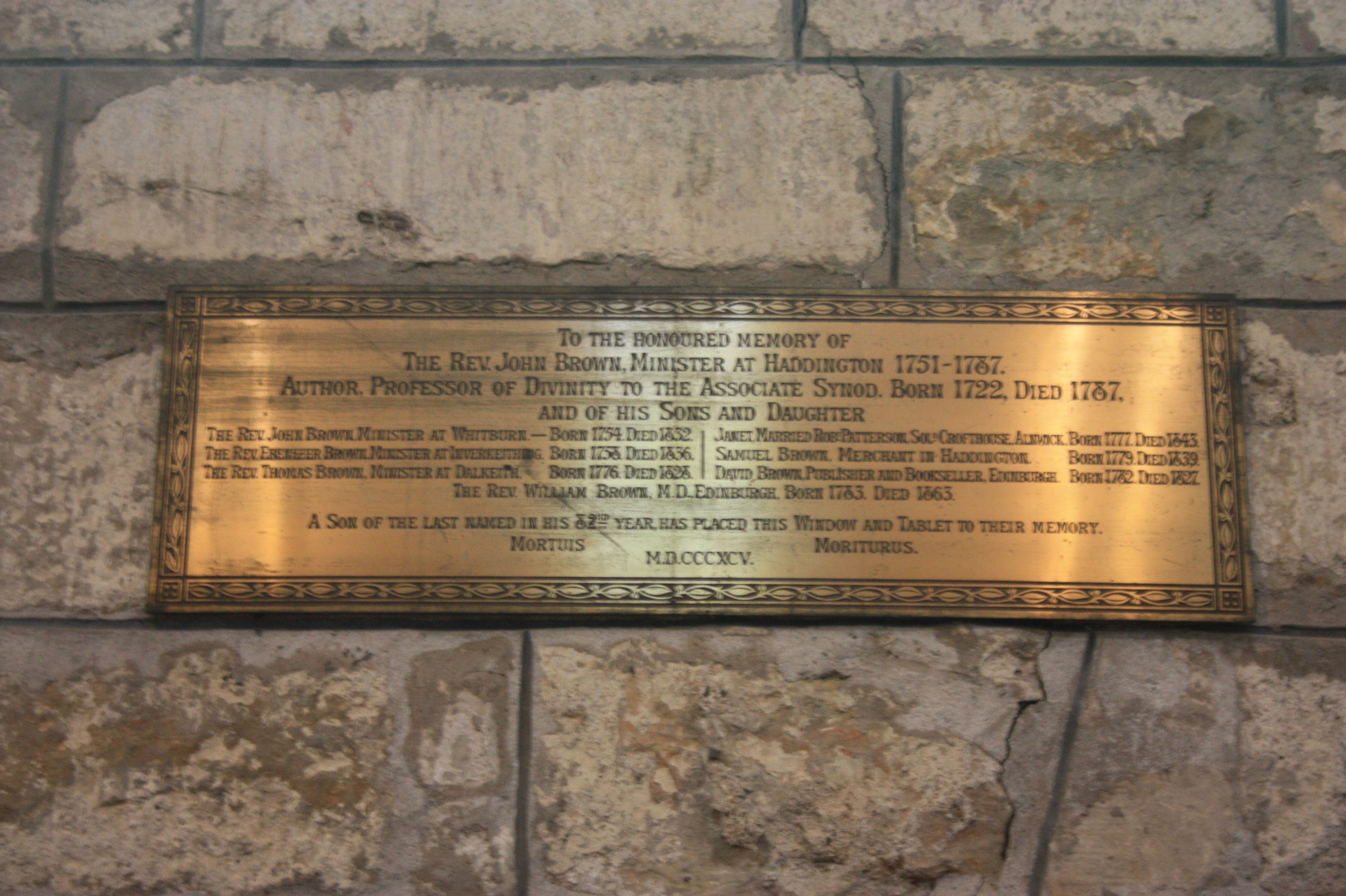
Brass plaque to Rev John Brown and family, St Marys, Haddington

The next few years saw Brown work as a pedlar and a schoolmaster, with an interlude as a volunteer soldier in defence against the Jacobites in the Forty-Five rebellion. He volunteered with his best friend Tim Knab and for some time was one of the garrison of Edinburgh Castle. When the war was over, he again took up his pack for a time, but soon found more congenial occupation as a schoolmaster. He been teaching in 1747, and taught at Gairney Bridge, near Kinross, and at the Spittal, West Linton. His teaching days were not a relaxing time. He would commit to memory fifteen chapters of the Bible as an evening exercise after the labours of the day, and after such killing efforts, allow himself but four hours of repose.

== Breach in the Secession Church ==
In 1747, a 'breach' occurred in the secession church, to which he belonged. Two bodies were formed, called the Burghers and the Anti-burghers, of whom the first maintained that it was, and the second that it was not, lawful to take the burgess oath in the Scottish towns. Following the division, there was a need for preachers in the Burgher branch, and Brown was the first new divinity student. Brown adhered to the more liberal view, and now began to prepare himself for the ministry, he studied theology and philosophy in connection with the Associate Burgher Synod under Ebenezer Erskine of Stirling, and James Fisher of Glasgow. In 1750 he was licensed to preach the gospel, and next year was unanimously called to the associate congregation of Haddington.

== Haddington ministry ==
He was ordained as a minister at Haddington, East Lothian, on 4 July 1751, and that was his home for the rest of his life. He was called to occupy the position of Moderator of the Synod for the year from November 1753.

His congregation was small and poor, but though afterwards invited to be pastor to the Dutch church, New York, he never left it. His ministerial duties were very hard, for during most of the year he delivered three sermons and a lecture every Sunday, whilst visiting and catechising occupied many a weekday. Still he found time to do much other work. His first publication was in 1758, and he published regularly from that date until the end of his life.

== Publishing work ==
In 1758 he published 'An Help for the Ignorant. Being an Essay towards an Easy Explication of the Westminster Confession of Faith and Catechism, composed for the young ones of his own congregation.' This 'easy explication' was a volume of about 400 pages. In it he had taken occasion to affirm that Christ's righteousness, though in itself infinitely valuable, is only imparted to believers according to their need, and not so as to render them infinitely righteous. In the following year 'A brief Dissertation concerning the Righteousness of Christ' expounded the same view. He had branded the doctrine he opposed as 'antinomian and familistic blasphemy,' but notwithstanding it was defended by various anti-burgher divines, who retorted on him the charges of 'heresy,' 'blasphemy,' and 'familism,' accused him of 'gross and palpable misrepresentation,' lamented the 'poisonous fruit,' and dwelt on the 'glaring absurdity' of his doctrine (see Doctrine of the Unity and Uniformity of Christ's Surety righteousness viewed and vindicated, &c. By Rev. John Dalziel (Edin. 1760), pp. 72–4). This bitter controversy did not prevent Brown from doing acts of practical kindness to various anti-burgher brethren. He continued to write diligently, and his name became more widely known. In 1768 he was appointed professor in divinity to the Associate burgher Synod. A great deal of work, but no salary, was attached to this office; the students studied under Brown at Haddington during a session of nine weeks each year (McKerrow's History, p. 787).

In 1778 his best-known work, the 'Self-interpreting Bible,' was published at Edinburgh in two volumes. Its design, he explains in the preface, is to present the labours of the best commentators ' in a manner that might best comport with the ability and leisure of the poorer and labouring part of mankind, and especially to render the oracles of God their own interpreter.' Thus the work contains history, chronology, geography, summaries, explanatory notes, and reflections—in short, everything that the ordinary reader might be supposed to want. It is a library in one volume. Brown is always ready to give what he believes to be the only possible explanation of each verse, and to draw its only possible practical lesson therefrom. The style throughout is clear and vigorous. The book at once acquired a popularity which among a large class it has never lost. It has been read widely among the English-speaking nations, as well as in Wales and the Scottish highlands. How well known it and Brown's other works were in Scotland some characteristic lines of Burns bear witness:—

For now I'm grown sae cursed douce,
I pray an' ponder butt the house;
My shins, my lane, I there sit roastin'
Perusing Bunyan, Brown, an' Boston.

(Letter to James Tail of Glenconner, lines 19–22.)

His numerous other works strengthened his reputation, but none brought him any profit. One of his publishers, 'of his own good will,' presented him with about 40l., but this he lent and lost to another. His salary from his church was for a long time only 40l. per annum, and it was never more than 50l. Only a very small sum came to him from other sources. The stern self-denial that was a frequent feature in the early Scottish household enabled him to bring up a large family, and meet all the calls of necessity and duty on this income. 'Notwithstanding my eager desire for books, I chose rather to want them, and much more other things, than run into debt,' he says. At least one-tenth of his small means was set apart for works of charity.

== Character ==
Throughout his life Brown was an eager student, and his attainments were considerable. He knew most of the European and several oriental languages. He was well read in history and divinity; his acquaintance with the Bible was of the most minute description. Although he says that 'few plays or romances are safely read, as they tickle the imagination, and are apt to infect with their defilement,' so that 'even the most pure, as Young, Thomson, Addison, Richardson, bewitch the soul, and are apt to indispose for holy meditation and other religious exercises,' and although he eagerly opposed the relaxation of the penal statutes against Roman catholics, he was, in regard to many things, not at all a narrow-minded man. His creed was to him a matter of such intense conviction, that nothing seemed allowable that tended in any way to oppose it or distract attention from its solemn doctrines. His preaching was earnest, simple, and direct, as if I had never read a book but the Bible.' His delivery was 'sing-song,' yet 'this in him was singularly melting to serious minds.' A widely current story affirms that David Hume heard him preach, and the 'sceptic' was so impressed that he said, 'That old man speaks as if the Son of God stood at his elbow.' The anecdote, though undoubtedly mythical, shows the popular impression as to his preaching.

== Other duties ==
In the year 1768, in consequence of the death of the Rev. John Swanston of Kinross, Professor of Divinity under the Associate Synod, Mr Brown was elected to the vacant chair. The duties of this important office he discharged with great ability and exemplary diligence and success. His public prelections were directed to the two main objects, first, of instructing his pupils in the science of Christianity, and secondly, of impressing their hearts with its power. The system of Divinity which he was led, in the course of his professional duty, to compile, and which was afterwards published, is perhaps the one of all his works which exhibits most striking proofs of precision, discrimination, and enlargement of thought; and is altogether one of the most dense, and at the same time perspicuous views which has yet been given of the theology of the Westminster Confession. During this time Brown also continued his duties as a minister. From 1768 until the year of his death he also had the permanent post of clerk of the synod.

== Famous contacts ==
His contacts with three famous contemporaries have been documented:

- In 1771 Brown began a long correspondence with Selina Hastings, Countess of Huntingdon. which encouraged them mutually in their Christian endeavour.
- In 1772 Brown was walking in Haddington Cemetery when he met Robert Fergusson, the poet, in a dark mood.
- The philosopher David Hume heard Brown preaching in North Berwick and commented that Brown preached "as if he were conscious that Christ was at his elbow".

== Death ==
Brown's labours finally ruined his health, which during the last years of his life was very poor. He continued his work to very near the end. Brown died at his home in Haddington on 19 June 1787, after months of stomach problems. His last words were "My Christ". He was interred in the church-yard there, where there is a monument to his memory. A memorial stained glass window and brass plaque to his memory lie in St Mary's Collegiate Church, Haddington.

== Works ==
John Brown wrote numerous books, of which the most notable are described here.

Only one dictionary of the Bible (by Thomas Wilson (1563–1622)), by then long out of print, had preceded Brown's The Dictionary of the Bible. It therefore met a need and after the initial edition published in 1769 numerous editions, variously amended, were issued until 1868. It expressed a Calvinist theology, and in it, the author estimated that 2016 would see the Millennium. Many articles in it are long and appear to be tracts or sermons.

A General History of the Christian Church was issued in two volumes in 1771.

The Self Interpreting Bible, first published in Edinburgh, Scotland in 1778, was Brown's most significant work, and it remained in print (edited by others), until well into the twentieth century. The objective of providing a commentary for ordinary people was very successful. The idea that the Bible was "self-interpreting" involved copious marginal references, especially comparing one scriptural statement with another. Brown also provided a substantial introduction to the Bible, and added an explication and "reflections" for each chapter.

A measure of its popularity is that it was translated into Welsh, and its appearance in Robert Burns's "Epistle to James Tennant".

Some of his original manuscripts are held by East Lothian Council Archives.

== Bibliography ==
=== John Brown's works ===
- 1758, A Help for the Ignorant
- 1764, Two short Catechisms, mutually connected
- 1764, The Christian Journal
- 1765, The Christian Journal
- 1766, An Historical Account of the Rise and Progress of the Secession
- 1767, Letter on the Constitution, Government, and Discipline of the Christian Church
- 1768, Sacred Tropology,
- 1769, A Dictionary of the Bible
- 1769, Religious Steadfastness recommended
- 1771, A General History of the Christian Church 2 vols.
- 1775, The Psalms of David in metre, with Notes
- 1778, The Self-interpreting Bible (Edinburgh, published by Gavin Alston, 2 vols., 1st edition overall)
- 1779, The Oracles of Christ and the Abomination of Antichrist compared, a brief View of the Errors, Impieties, and Inhumanities of Popery
- 1780, The Absurdity and Perfidy of All Authoritative Toleration of Gross Heresy, Blasphemy, Idolatry, Popery, in Britain.
- 1780, The fearful Shame and Contempt of those professed Christians who neglect to raise up spiritual Children in Christ
- 1780, The Re-exhibition of the Testimony vindicated, in opposition to the unfair account of it given by the Rev. Adam Gib (Gib was a prominent anti-burgher clergyman who in this year had written 'An Account of the Burgher Re-exhibition of the Secession Testimony')
- 1781, The Christian, the Student, and Pastor exemplified in the lives of nine eminent Ministers
- 1781, An Evangelical and a Practical View of the Types and Figures of the Old Testament Dispensation
- 1782, The Young Christian, or the Pleasantness of Early Piety
- 1782, A compendious View of Natural and Revealed Religion
- 1783, Practical Piety exemplified in the Lives of Thirteen Eminent Christians
- 1783, A brief Concordance to the Holy Scriptures
- 1783, Necessity and Advantage of Prayer in choice of Pastors
- 1784, A Compendious History of the British Churches
- 1784, The Harmony of Scripture Prophecies
- 1785, Thoughts on the Travelling of the Mail on the Lord's Day (as to this, see Cox's Lit. of Sabbath Question, ii. 248, Edin. 1865)
- 1789, Select Remains
- 1791, The Self-interpreting Bible (London, published by T. Bensley, 2 vols., 2nd edition overall, includes corrections/revision left by Brown for his sons to have integrated after his death)
- 1792, The Self-interpreting Bible (New York, published by Hodge and Campbell, 1 vol., 3rd edition overall, includes corrections/revision left by Brown for his sons to have integrated after his death / US President George Washington is the first of 1,279 subscribers noted by name, occupation, and city in each of the total 1,567 subscribed copies) / see 2024 facsimile highlights below
- 1797, Posthumous Works
- 1804, 'Apology for the more frequent Administration of the Lord's Supper
- 2024, The Forgotten George Washington Bible, (Tolle Lege' Press, Georgia) includes the first-ever full facsimile of the 1792/New York edition (above) of John Brown of Haddington's 'Self-Interpreting Bible' which was "subscribed" and autographed by US President George Washington--and likewise subscribed by numerous other VIP's of the USA's revolutionary and founding era. This 2024 facsimile (researched and developed by Dale T. Mason) includes a substantial 96,000 word illustrated historical overview and preface to the 1792 edition. Mason's 2024 facsimile features a substantial preface which includes significant documentation regarding President George Washington's spiritual growth and his key role in the success of the 1792 and later editions of Rev. John Brown's Self-Interpreting Bible. Washington's personally signed copy of the 1792 Self-Interpreting Bible still exists. It is owned and displayed by the 'George Washington Masonic National Memorial' museum in Alexandra, Virginia. The historical importance of that unparalled antiquity, and the detailed woodcut frontispiece that is found there, as well as in Mason's 2024 facsimile, illustrates the direct connection between the Scriptures and the Constitution that was widely understood and passionately defended by many founding era VIPs. A two-page advertisement for the 1792 edition was even included in America's 1789 "Acts of Congress...", shortly before pages began to be pressed in the new nation's first national capital, New York City. The complex 2-year printing process for the 1,567 pre-subscribed copies ran from June 1790 to April 1792. The spiritual connection between the Holy Bible, the US Constitution, and United States of America's early judicial and governmental system was openly believed and is clearly evidenced therein.

=== Works about Brown ===
- Various short lives of Brown are prefixed to several of his works
- the most authentic is the Memoir by his son, the Rev. William Brown, M.D., prefixed to an edition of the Select Remains (Edin. 1856). Some additional facts, together with an engraving from a family portrait, are given in Cooke's edition of Brown's Bible (Glasgow, 1855). Some of the more authentic of the many anecdotes about Brown are collected in Dr. John Brown's Letter to the Rev. J. Cairns, D.D. (2nd ed. Edin. 1861); see also McKerrow's History of the Secession Church (Glasgow, 1841).

== Family ==
Rev Ebeneezer Brown (1758-1836), minister of St John's Church Inverkeithing 1780 to 1836.

He was twice married: first to Janet Thomson, Musselburgh, second to Violet Croumbie, Stenton, East Lothian. Brown had six sons, from two marriages, of whom four became ministers, and another the provost of Haddington. His sons included:

- Rev John Brown (1754-1832) minister of Whitekirk
- Rev Ebenezer Brown (1758-1836) minister of St John's Church, Inverkeithing
- Rev Thomas Brown (1776-1828) minister of Dalkeith
- Samuel Brown (1779-1839) merchant in Haddington
- David Brown (1782-1827) bookseller at 16 South St Andrew St in Edinburgh
- Rev William Brown MD (1783-1863)

His great-grandson John Brown was known as a physician and author.

Academic offices
Preceded by John Swanston	Professor of Theology of the Burgher Secession Church in Scotland; 1768-1787	Succeeded by George Lawson
