= Carpow =

Coordinates: 56.343119°N 3.290949°W

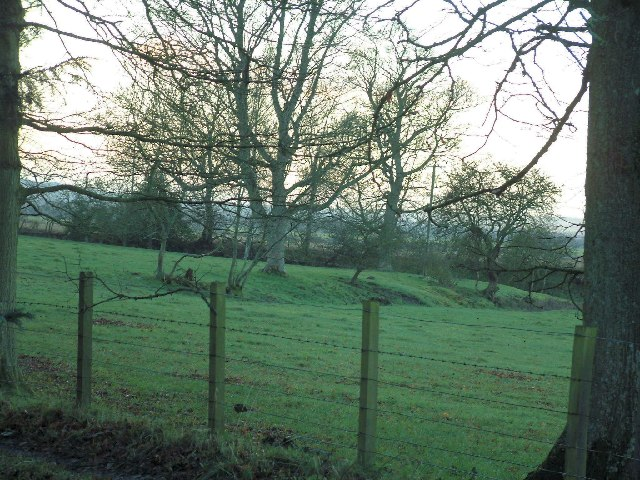
- Roman fort at Carpow

- Location within Perth and Kinross
- OS grid reference: NO203175
- Council area: Perth and Kinross
- Lieutenancy area: Perth and Kinross
- Country: Scotland
- Sovereign state: United Kingdom
- Post town: PERTH
- Postcode district: PH2 9xx
- Dialling code: 01738 85
- Police: Scotland
- Fire: Scottish
- Ambulance: Scottish

Carpow (/kɑːrˈpaʊ/) is a diffuse hamlet in Perth and Kinross, Scotland. It is situated immediately to the east of the confluence of the River Tay and River Earn, 2 km north east of Abernethy.

== Etymology ==
The name Carpow is of Pictish origin. The first element is *cair, meaning "fort, castle", and the second is *pol, meaning "(sluggish) burn" (cf. Welsh caer-pwll).

== Archaeology ==
Carpow is most notable for its archaeological remains. Mesolithic hunter-gatherers arrived in the area more than 8,000 years ago. Nearby Neolithic standing stones and circles followed the introduction of farming from about 4,000 BC, and a remarkably well preserved Bronze Age log boat dated to around 1,000 BC was found in the mudflats of the River Tay at Carpow.

During Roman times the settlement was the site of a camp and fort, which was made of stone, signalling the intent to stay for an extended period. An early medieval Picto-Scottish cross fragment once formed part the lintel of a well at Carpow House.

=== Roman fort ===
The Roman fort of Carpow was a Roman fortress situated at the confluence of the rivers Tay and Earn. The fortress is known to have been occupied from the late second century AD until the early third century AD. The site of the fort has not been comprehensively excavated but it is believed to have served as a naval supply depot for Roman forces in the Central Lowlands. Its occupation also coincided with the campaigns of Septimius Severus in the area.

== See also ==
- Abernethy
- Perth
