= United Secession Church =

Scottish Presbyterian denomination

- Classification: Protestant
- Orientation: Calvinist
- Polity: Presbyterian
- Origin: 1820
- Separated from: Church of Scotland
- Defunct: merged with the Presbytery of Relief in 1847 to form the United Presbyterian Church of Scotland

The United Secession Church (or properly the United Associate Synod of the Secession Church) was a Scottish Presbyterian denomination which existed between 1820 and 1847.

== History ==
Timeline showing the evolution of the churches of Scotland from 1560

The First Secession from the established Church of Scotland had been in 1732, and the resultant "Associate Presbytery" grew to include 45 congregations. A series of disputes, in 1747 over the burgesses oath, and in the late 18th century over the Westminster confession, led to further splits. In 1820 two of the resulting groups, the New Licht Burghers and the New Licht Anti-Burghers, united to form the United Secession Church. The denomination existed until 1847 when it merged with the Presbytery of Relief to form the United Presbyterian Church.

== Theological Professors ==
1. John Dick - Professor of Theology - 1820-1833.
2. John Mitchell - Professor of Biblical Criticism (Biblical Literature from 1834) - 1825-1843
3. John Brown - Professor of Exegetical Theology - 1834-1847
4. Alexander Duncan - Professor of Pastoral Theology - 1834-1843
5. Robert Balmer - Professor of Systematic Theology - 1834-1844.
6. James Harper - Professor of Pastoral Theology - 1843-1846 and Professor of Systematic Theology - 1846-1847.
7. John Eadie - Professor of Biblical Literature - 1843-1847.

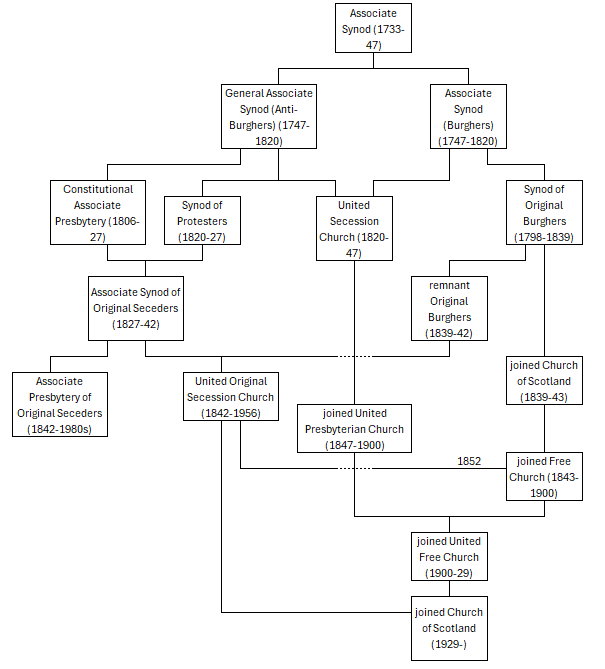
Secession church history

== Other notable members ==
- John Jamieson (died 1838)

== See also ==
- The Marrow Controversy, which was a precursor to the First Secession
