= John Eadie =

John Eadie (9 May 1810 – 3 June 1876) was a Scottish theologian and biblical critic.

== Life ==
He was born at Alva in Stirlingshire (now in Clackmannanshire). Having studied the arts curriculum at the University of Glasgow, he studied for the ministry at the Divinity Hall of the United Secession Church, a dissenting body which, on its union a few years later with the Relief Church, adopted the title the United Presbyterian Church.

In 1843 Eadie was appointed professor of biblical literature and hermeneutics in the Divinity Hall of the United Presbyterian body. He held this appointment along with his ministerial charge for the rest of his life.

He received the honorary degree of LLD from Glasgow University in 1844, and that of DD from the University of St Andrews in 1850. He died at 6 Thornville Terrace in Hillhead, Glasgow on 3 June 1876. He is buried in the Glasgow Necropolis not far from the John Knox monument.

His book collection was bought and presented to the United Presbyterian College.

== Ministry ==
In 1835 Eadie became minister of the Cambridge Street Secession church in Glasgow, and for many years he was generally regarded as the leading representative of his denomination in Glasgow. As a preacher, though he was not eloquent, he was distinguished by good sense, earnestness and breadth of sympathy. In 1863 he removed with a portion of his congregation to the new Lansdowne United Presbyterian Church, which became a notable landmark at Kelvinbridge. Cambridge Street was in one of the poorer parts of Glasgow, in stark contrast to the Lansdowne area. This gave rise to the following verse, well known in Glasgow church circles:

This Church is not built for the poor and needy,
But for the rich and Dr. Eadie.
The rich may come in and take their seat,
But the poor must go to Cambridge Street.

He served as Moderator of the General Assembly for the United Presbyterian Church of Scotland for the year 1857/8.

== Works ==
His publications were connected with biblical criticism and interpretation, some of them being for popular use and others more strictly academic. To the former class belong the Biblical Cyclopaedia, his edition of Alexander Cruden's Concordance, his Early Oriental History, and his discourses on the Divine Love and on Paul the Preacher; to the latter his commentaries on the Greek text of St Paul's epistles to the Ephesians, Colossians, Philippians and Galatians, published at intervals in four volumes.

His last work was the History of the English Bible (2 vols, 1876). He rendered service as one of the revisers of the authorized version.

== Memorials ==
In his home town of Alva the Eadie Church is named in his memory and a drinking fountain with his portrait in low relief stands in Alva Glen.

== Family ==
He married Allison Pringle Palfrey of Edinburgh. They had five children. She died suddenly in 1855.

In 1862 he married Mary Home of Berwick-upon-Tweed.

Academic offices
Preceded by John Mitchell	Professor of Biblical Literature of the United Secession Church; 1843-1847	Succeeded by Himself as Professor of Hermeneutics and Evidences of the United; Presbyterian Church (Scotland)
Preceded by Himself as Professor of Biblical Literature of the United Secession Church	Professor of Hermeneutics and Evidences of the United; Presbyterian Church (Scotland); 1847-1867	Succeeded by Himself as Professor of Biblical; Literature and Exegesis of the United Presbyterian Church (Scotland)
Preceded by Himself as Professor of Hermeneutics and Evidences of the United; Presbyterian Church (Scotland)	Professor of Biblical; Literature and Exegesis of the United Presbyterian Church (Scotland); 1867-1876	Succeeded by Robert Johnstone
