= Burgher (Church history) =

Scottish Presbyterian faction, 1747–1900

In the Scottish church of the 18th and 19th centuries, a burgher was a person who upheld the lawfulness of the Burgher Oath.

The Burgher Oath was the oath that a town burgess was required to swear on taking office.

The Burghers' position was in opposition to the Seceders and Anti-Burghers.

== Background ==
The Rescissory Act 1661 stated that all ministers and preachers in Scotland needed to acquire a patron (usually a local laird who would choose which minister would preach in their area). A quarter of the clergy refused to hand over authority to a person outside the church and consequently lost their jobs. They continued to preach independently and illegally, which led to armed rebellion and to The Killing Time in the 1680s. Patronage in Scotland was halted in the 1690s.

A new Patronage Act was legislated in 1711. According to Dale Jorgenson, "The Patronage Act, enacted under the reign of Queen Anne (1702-1714), gave lay patrons the right to present ministers to parishes. This act of patronage was an affront to classic Presbyterianism, and resulted in a division between Burghers who accepted the Burghers' Oath and its consequent patronage, and the Anti-Burghers who would not accept the oath".

== Church splits ==
The First Secession occurred in 1733 and was triggered by the General Assembly of the Church of Scotland giving priority in the appointment of minister to the parish's patron. Dissenting attendees to the General Assembly stated that church ministers should be chosen by church elders. That led to the creation of the Associate Congregation in 1740, commonly called the "Secession Church".

The "Secession Church" then split in 1747 into the Burghers and the Anti-Burghers over the lawfulness of the forms of the civil oath expected of Burgesses of Perth, Edinburgh and Glasgow. The contentious clause required the burgess, or oathgiver, to profess that the true religion was the one professed within the realm.

The Burghers continued to meet as the Associate Synod, and the Anti-Burghers created the General Associate Synod.

Both groups later had internal splits, with the Burghers splitting in 1798 into the "Auld Licht" Calvinist group, which held to the Solemn League and Covenant, and the "New Licht", which was more liberal and influential. The Auld Lichts created the Original Associate Synod.

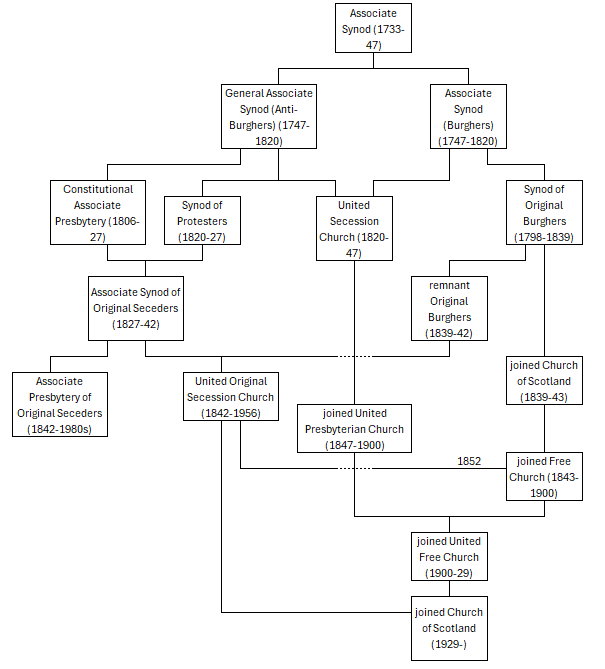
Secession church history

== Legacy ==
In 1820, many of the Burgher and Anti-Burgher congregations united into one denomination. Some churches did not wish to unite and went on to form a separate denomination.

In 1842, the General Assembly of the Church of Scotland wrote to the newly-crowned Queen Victoria and urged the end of patronage. That did not happen and several ministers went on to form the Free Kirk.

Patronage was finally abolished by Parliament in 1874.

== Notable Burghers ==
- Robert Balmer ('New Licht' - subsequently Professor of Theology of the United Secession Church)
- John Brown of Haddington (ordained after the 1747 'Breach' and died before the 'Auld Licht'/'New Licht' division), Professor of Theology of the Associate Presbytery
- John Dick, 'New Licht' Professor of Theology of the Associate Presbytery
- Ebenezer Erskine (one of the 1733 seceeders) (died before the 'Auld Licht'/'New Licht' division)
- Ralph Erskine (seceded 1737) (died before the 'Auld Licht'/'New Licht' division)
- James Fisher (one of the 1733 seceeders) (died before the 'Auld Licht'/'New Licht' division)
- George Lawson (1749-1820), 'New Licht' Professor of Theology of the Associate Presbytery.
- Alexander Moncrieff (one of the 1733 seceeders) (died before the 'Auld Licht'/'New Licht' division)
- Michael Willis 'Auld Licht' Professor of Theology, son of the next
- William Willis, 'Auld Licht' Professor of Theology, father of the previous
- William Wilson (one of the 1733 seceeders)

== Theological Professors ==
=== Before the 'Auld Licht'/'New Licht' division (1736–1800) ===
1. William Wilson (1736–1741)
2. Alexander Moncrieff (1741–1761)
3. John Swanston (1764–1767)
4. John Brown of Haddington (1768–1787)
5. George Lawson (1787–1800)

=== New Light (1800–1820) ===
1. George Lawson (1787–1800)
2. John Dick (1820)

=== Old Light (1800–1839) ===
1. William Willis (1800–1803)
2. George Hill (1803–1819)
3. William Taylor (appointed interim Professor, 1818) (1819–1833) (died 1836)
4. Michael Willis (1835–1839)
