= William King (minister) =

Irish-born minister and abolitionist

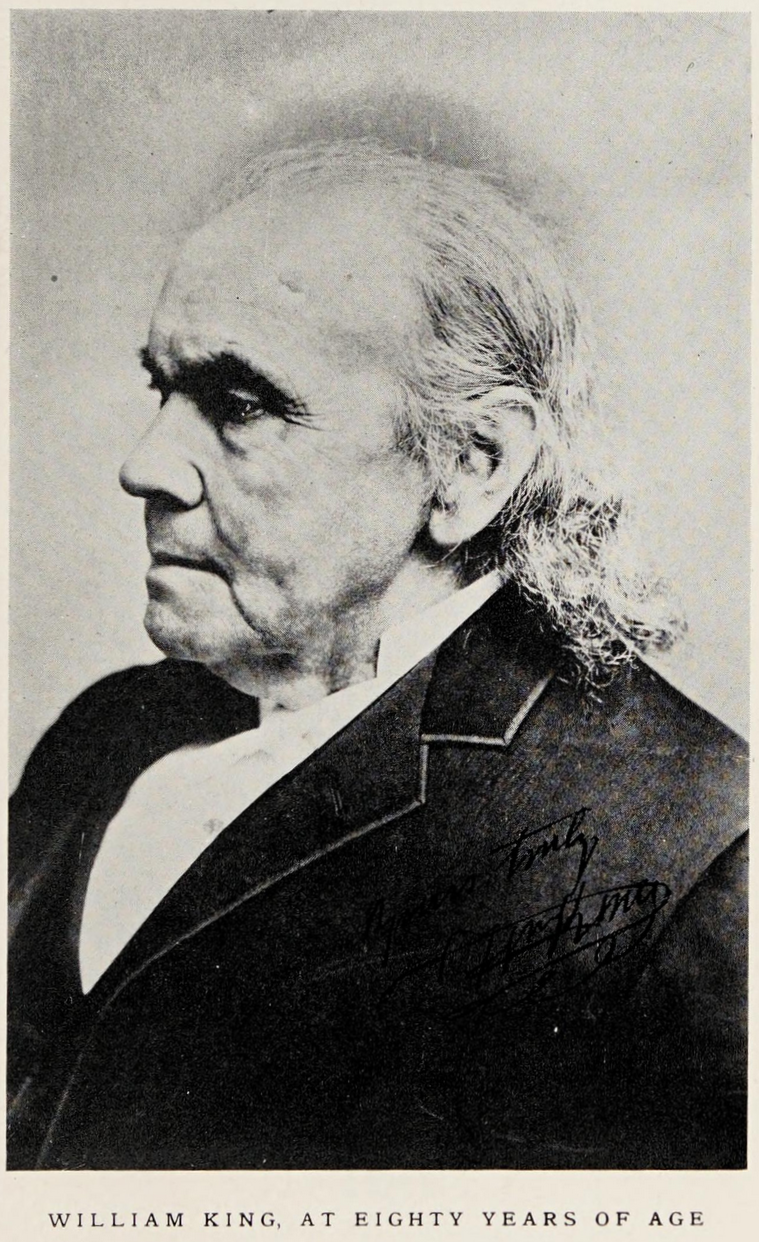
Rev. William King.

A former enslaved person, free in Canada thanks to the efforts of Rev. William King.

William King (November 11, 1812 – January 5, 1895) was an Irish-born minister and abolitionist. He founded the Elgin settlement, a community of former African-American slaves, in southwestern Ontario.

The son of William King and Elizabeth Torrence, he was born on the family farm near Derry and was educated at Coleraine Academy and the University of Glasgow. In 1833, his family sold their farm in Ireland and moved to Ohio, where they purchased land to establish a new farm. King moved to Natchez, Mississippi in 1836, where he worked as a teacher. In 1840, he became rector for Mathews Academy in Louisiana. In 1842, King married Mary Mourning Phares, the daughter of a local planter. Through his wife's dowry, he became the owner of two slaves. Although opposed in principle to slavery, King purchased three more slaves because, in that time and place, it was not possible to hire servants or to free slaves.

In 1844, King travelled to Edinburgh to study divinity at the Free Church College. Later that year, he returned to the United States to bring his family to Scotland. His son died before they had left the United States. His wife gave birth to a daughter the following year but both his wife and daughter died in 1846. In August 1846, King became a licensed minister; he was sent to Canada as a missionary. Because his father-in-law died in 1845, he inherited the family estate which mostly consisted of slaves. King decided that he would bring his fifteen slaves to Ohio, where he could set them free.

He had proposed to the Toronto synod of the Free Presbyterian Church of Canada to establish a mission settlement in Canada, where free slaves could settle. With the co-operation of Lord Elgin and despite a petition against the settlement signed by 300 local landowners, the Elgin association was established to support the creation of the new settlement. The association purchased a parcel of land in Raleigh township in Canada West. King invited his own former slaves to join the new settlement. The settlement's first school opened in 1850. The following year, a brickyard and a savings bank were established.

In 1853, King married Jemima Nicolina Baxter.

During the American Civil War, about seventy men from the settlement served in the Union Army. In 1873, the Elgin Association was officially dissolved. King left the settlement in 1887 and moved to Chatham, where he died eight years later.

In 1999, the Buxton area was recognized as a National Historic Site. King was named a Person of National Historic Significance by the Canadian government in 2011.
