= William Wilson (Secession minister) =

Scottish Presbyterian minister (1690–1741)

Personal details
- Born: 1690
- Died: 1741 (Burgher split 1747)
- Denomination: Church of Scotland; Secession Church

William Wilson was born in Glasgow, on 9 November 1690. He was the son of Gilbert Wilson, proprietor of a small estate near East Kilbride. (Gilbert forfeited this for his adherence to the Presbyterian cause; he went to Holland, but returning at the Revolution, was appointed Comptroller of Customs at Greenock). William Wilson's mother was Isabella, daughter of Ramsay of Shielhill. William was named after William of Orange and was educated at University of Glasgow, graduating with an M.A. in 1707. He was licensed by the Presbytery of Dunfermline on 23 September 1713 and called unanimously on 21 August 1716. He was ordained on 1 November 1716. He had a call to Rhynd, but was continued by the Presbytery in Perth. Associating with the supporters of the Marrow of Modern Divinity, he with three others Ebenezer Erskine, Alexander Moncrieff, and James Fisher laid the foundation of the Secession Church, for which they were suspended by the Commission of Assembly 9 August, and declared no longer ministers of the Church 12 November 1733. He was deposed by the Assembly 15 May 1740. He and his people erected a meeting-house, and the Associate Presbytery appointed him their Professor of Divinity, 5 November 1736, but he sank under his contentions and labours and died 8 October 1741. He is said to have combined "the excellencies of both Erskines, with excellencies peculiar to himself."

== Life ==
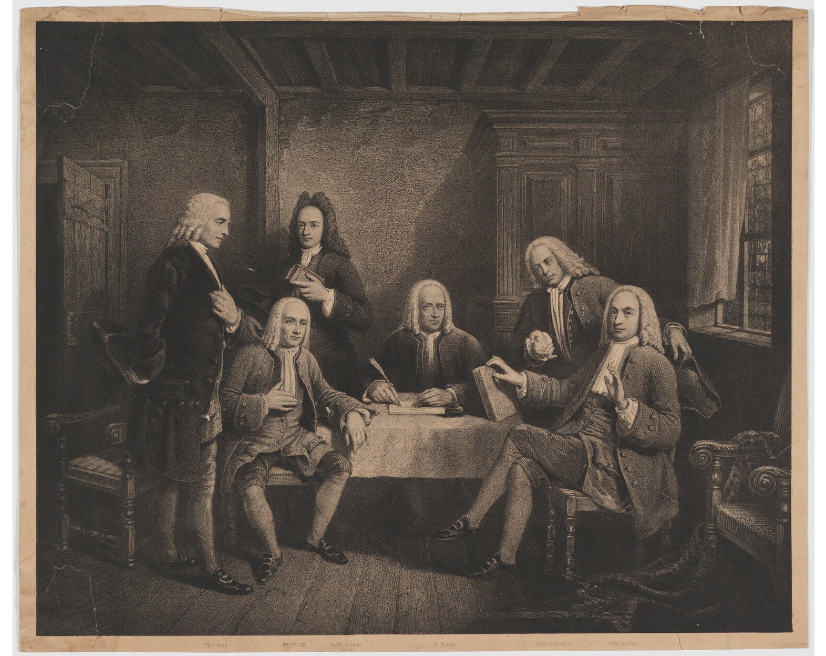
First Secession Churchmen

William Wilson, Scots divine, was born at Glasgow on 19 November 1690, was the son of Gilbert Wilson (d. 1 June 1711), proprietor of a small estate near East Kilbride, who underwent religious persecution and the loss of his lands during the reign of Charles II. His mother, Isabella (d. 1705), daughter of Ramsay of Shielhill in Forfarshire, was disowned by her father for becoming a presbyterian. William, who was named after William II, was educated at Glasgow University. He was laureated on 27 June 1707, and was licensed to preach by the presbytery of Dunfermline on 23 September 1713. On 21 August 1716 he was unanimously called to the new or west church at Perth, and on 1 November he was ordained. He soon obtained great influence in the town by the disinterestedness of his conduct, refusing to contest at law his claim to his grandfather's estate, and declining to receive his stipend because the town council desired to pay it out of money placed in their hands for charitable purposes. On the commencement of the marrow controversy in 1717 he sympathised with the views of Thomas Boston and Ebenezer Erskine, concurring with these ministers on 11 May 1721 in the ‘representation’ against the condemnation of ‘The Marrow of Modern Divinitie’ by the general assembly. In 1732 a further cause of difference arose. The general assembly passed an act ordaining that when the right of presentation was not exercised by the patron, the ministers should be elected by the heritors and elders, and not by the congregation. This displeased Erskine, Wilson, and others, who regarded the congregational right as sacred, and Erskine preached a vehement sermon on the subject, for which he was censured by the synod of Perth and Stirling. The censure was confirmed by the general assembly, and on 14 May 1733 Wilson joined with Alexander Moncrieff and James Fisher in a protest. The assembly, indignant at the terms of the protest, required a retractation, and failing to obtain it, the standing commission suspended Wilson and his three associates on 9 August 1733, refused to hear a representation offered by Wilson and Moncrieff justifying their conduct, and on 12 November declared them no longer ministers of the Scottish church. On 16 November the four ministers put their names to a formal act of secession, and on 6 December they constituted themselves an Associate Presbytery. On 14 May 1734, however, the assembly, repenting their action, empowered the synods to reinstate the four ministers. Wilson was anxious for reconciliation, but further differences had arisen, especially through the support afforded by the assembly to patrons against the congregational veto. On 5 November 1736 the Associate Presbytery appointed Wilson their professor of divinity, and on 15 May 1740 the seceders, now eight in number, were finally deposed. Wilson enjoyed the support of a large part of the people of Perth, who built a church for him and thronged to hear him. He was, however, deeply affected by the controversy and broken in health by his labours. He died at Perth on 8 November 1741, and was buried at Perth, in Greyfriars' cemetery, where a monument was erected to his memory with an epitaph by Ralph Erskine.

== Family ==
He married 20 June 1721, Margaret, daughter of George Alexander of Peffermill, advocate, and had issue –

- William, died aged 11
- Katherine
- George, died in infancy
- Isabella (married John Muckersie, minister of Associate Secession Congregation, Kinkell), died 1798
- Gilbert
- Elizabeth, died aged 9
- James
- Mary (married William Jameson, minister of Associate Secession Congregation, Kilwinning), died 1802 [Jameson had but a small stipend, and to eke out their income his wife manufactured thread and sold it. Their grandson, William Jameson, was the pioneer missionary of the United Presbyterian Church in Calabar]
- Margaret
- Marjory, died aged 16
- Thomas
- John, minister of the Associate Anti-burgher Congregation, Methven, born 1733, died 31 January 1803.

== Publications ==
- Seven Occasional Sermons (1727–38)
- A Defence of the Reformation Principles of the Church of Scotland (Edinburgh, 1739)
- A Continuation of the Defence (Edinburgh, 1741)
- Answers to Campbell's Discourse proving that the Apostles were no Enthuisiasts
- A Letter from a Member of the Associate Presbytery to a Minister in the Presbytery of Dunfermline
- Sermons by the Reverend and Learned Mr William Wilson (1748)

== Bibliography ==
- Cant's Perth
- Notes and Queries, 2nd ser. xii. 223
- New Stat. Acc. of Scotland, x. 111
- John Brown's Hist. Account of the Rise and Progress of the Secession, 1766
- The Representations of Ebenezer Erskine and James Fisher and of William Wilson and Alexander Moncrieff to the Commission of the late General Assembly, 1733
- A Review of the Narrative and State of the Proceedings of the Judicatories against Erskine, Wilson, Moncrieff, and Fisher, 1734
- Pilulæ Spleneticæ; or, a Laugh from a true blue Presbyterian, 1736
- X. Y.'s Observations upon Church Affairs, 1734
- Munimenta Glasguen. (Maitland Club), iii. 43
- Struthers's Hist. of Scotland from the Union to 1748
- Adam Gib's Present Truth: a Display of the Secession Testimony, 1774.

Academic offices
New title	Professor of Theology of the Secession Church in Scotland; 1736-1741	Succeeded by Alexander Moncrieff
