= Alexander Moncrieff =

Alexander Moncrieff is the name of:

- Alexander Bain Moncrieff (1845–1928), Irish-born engineer, active in Australia
- Alexander Moncrieff, Lord Moncrieff (1870–1949), Scottish lawyer and judge
- Alexander Moncrieff (minister) (c. 1613 – 1688), Scottish Presbyterian preacher
- Alexander Moncrieff (Secession minister) (1695–1761), Scottish Presbyterian minister
