= James Fisher (Secession minister) =

Original First Secession minister

Personal details
- Born: 1697
- Died: 1775 (aged 77–78)
- Denomination: (1) Church of Scotland (2) Secession Church (3) Burgher Seceder

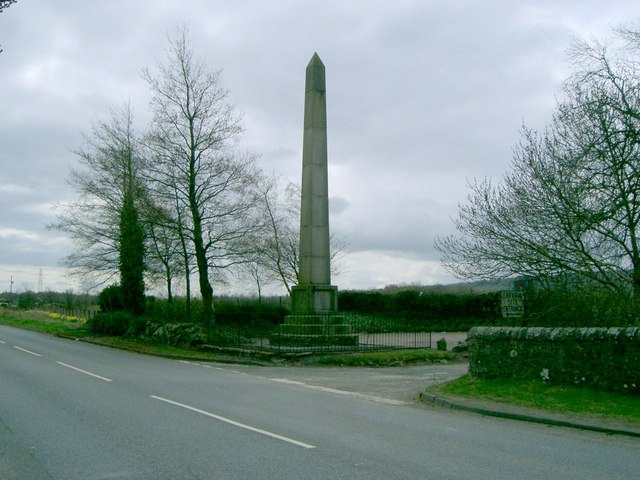
Secession Monument - Gairneybridge

James Fisher (1697–1775) was one of the founders of the Scottish Secession church. He was born at Barr, on 23 January 1697, the second son of Thomas Fisher, minister of Rhynd. He was educated at University of Glasgow. He was licensed by the Presbytery of Perth on 31 October 1722 and subsequently called (5 October) and ordained on 23 December 1725. He dissented and joined with his father-in-law Ebenezer Erskine in his appeal and complaint to the Assembly of 1733. He was one of the four original members of the Associate Presbytery founded at Gairney Bridge on 6 December 1733. He was deposed by the General Assembly on 15 May 1740, but continued to preach in the parish church till 13 August 1741, when he was forcibly ejected on a sheriff's warrant. He then preached in a tent on Kinclaven brae during the time he remained in the district. On 8 October 1741 he became minister of Shuttle Street Associate Congregation, Glasgow (later Greyfriars United Free Church). He was deposed by the Associate (Antiburgher) Synod on 4 August 1748 over the question of the Burgess Oath. He was appointed Professor of Divinity by the Associate (Burgher) Synod in 1749. He died on 28 September 1775.

== Life ==
Fisher was born on 23 January 1697 at Barr, Ayrshire, where his father, Thomas, was minister, studied at Glasgow University, and was ordained minister of Kinclaven, Perthshire, in 1725. In 1727 he married the daughter of the Rev. Ebenezer Erskine of Portmoak, Kinross-shire, with whom he was afterwards associated as a founder of the secession body. Fisher concurred with Erskine and other likeminded ministers in their views both as to patronage and doctrine, and in opposition to the majority of the general assembly, by whom their representations were wholly disregarded. In 1732 Erskine preached a sermon at the opening of the synod of Perth, in which he boldly denounced the policy of the church as unfaithful to its Lord and Master. For this he was rebuked by the general assembly; but against the sentence he protested, and was joined by three ministers, of whom Fisher was one. The protest was declared to be insulting, and the ministers who signed it were thrust out of the church, and ultimately formed the Associate Presbytery.

The people of Kinclaven adhered almost without exception to their minister, and the congregation increased by accessions from neighbouring parishes. Fisher was subsequently translated to Glasgow (8 October 1741), but was deposed by the associate Anti-Burgher synod 4 August 1748. In 1749 the associate burgher synod gave him the office of professor of divinity.

== Family ==
He married 4 July 1727, Jean (died 1 Dec. 1771), daughter of Ebenezer Erskine, minister of Portmoak, and had issue — Ebenezer, born 1739, died at Newbern, North Carolina, 1767; Ralph, West India' merchant, born 1743, died 1792; Margaret, born 1745 (married 1768, Walter Ewing Maclae of Cathkin), died 1815; Jean (marr. 1754, James Erskine, minister of Secession Church, Stirling), died 1762; Alison (married Robert Campbell, Secession minister, Stirling); Ann (married 1773, William Wardlaw, Glasgow); Mary (marr., proc. 22 May 1763, John Gray, printer, Edinburgh); and eight others.

== Works ==
Fisher's eponymous catechism was designed to explain the Shorter Catechism of the Westminster Assembly. Fisher's Catechism (2 parts, Glasgow, 1753, 1760) was the result of contributions by many ministers of the body, which were made use of by the Erskine brothers (Ebenezer and Ralph) and Fisher. Fisher survived the other two and gave final form to the work, which passed through many editions; it was long the manual for catechetical instruction in the secession church; and it was a favourite with evangelicals outside the secession such as John Colquhoun of Leith (1748–1827) and Robert Haldane. Fisher was the author of various other works, mainly on matters of controversy at the time.

- The Inestimable Value of Divine Truth considered (1738)
- Christ Jesus the Lord, considered as the Inexhaustible Matter of Gospel Preaching (1740)
- A Review of Mr Robe's Preface to the Narrative of the Extraordinary Work at Kilsyth, etc. (1742) (a negative review of the revival under James Robe at Kilsyth. Seceders were also negative towards Whitefield and Wesley).
- Christ the Sole and Wonderful Doer in the Work of Man's Redemption (1745)
- Review of Pamphlet entitled "A Serious Enquiry into the Burgess Oaths of Edinburgh, Glasgow, and Perth" (1748)
- The Character of a Faithful Minister of Jesus Christ (1752)
- The Doors of the Heart summoned to open to the King of Glory (1755)
- Preface to E. Erskine's Sermons
- Account of Mr Ralph Erskine (Works, i.) (Glasgow, 1764)
- A Letter to the Burgesses and others of his Congregation who have withdrawn from his Ministry (n.d.). Jointly with the two

Erskines, the First Part, but more prominently the Second Part, of the Synod's, which is not unfrequently styled Fisher's Catechism, or the Assembly's Shorter Catechism explained by Way of Question and Answer, 2 parts (Glasgow, 1753–60)

== Bibliography ==
- Fraser's Lives of Ebenezer and Ralph Erskine
- Adam Gib's Secession Testimony
- Memorials (United Presbyterian Fathers) by John Brown, D.D.
- Walker's Theology and Theologians of Scotland (1844)
- M'Kerrow's History of the Secession, 33, 47, 62
- Erskine - Halcro Genealogy
- Mackelvie's Annals, 601
- Small's Hist, of United Presbyterian Congregations, ii., 22, 636.

Academic offices
Preceded by Alexander Moncrieff as Professor of Theology of the Secession Church in Scotland	Professor of Theology of the Burgher Secession Church in Scotland; 1749-1764	Succeeded by John Swanston
