= Thomas Mair (minister) =

Scottish Anti-Burgher minister and moderator

Personal details
- Born: 1701 Scotland
- Died: 17 February 1768
- Denomination: (1) Church of Scotland (2) Secession Church (3) Anti-Burgher

Thomas Mair (1701 – 17 February 1768) was a Scottish Anti-Burgher minister and moderator of the Anti-Burgher Associate Synod.

== Biography ==
Thomas Mair was born in 1701, attended the University of Edinburgh, and was ordained a minister in the Presbytery of Kincardine O'Neil on 27 September 1725. Hew Scott's Fasti Ecclesiae Scoticanae records him as the son of William Mair, a manufacturer in Strathmiglo. However, Robert Small's History shows this to be an error, and asserts that it is "abundantly evident" from Mair's own diary that he was the son of George Mair of Culross. Small also corrects the Fasti's claim that Mair had three sons, declaring the persons named to be unrelated to Mair, on the basis that his nephew William Mair was declared his heir rather than any sons. The 1925 edition of the Fasti concurs with Small.

== Secession ==
Mair was one of two further ministers (the other being Ralph Erskine of Dunfermline) who in 1737 joined the "four seceders", the original four ministers of the First Secession of 1733. He had protested against their removal from office in 1733, and his election by the Consistory to minister of the Scottish Church in Rotterdam on 21 August 1736 had been quashed by magistrates on 24 November 1736, after it had been falsely reported to them by the British envoy at The Hague (according to letters sent by Robert Storie from Rotterdam in 1736) that he objected to patronage and was an Antinomian. Ebenezer Erskine had written to Rotterdam in support of Mair, as had minister Neil MacVicar (who denounced the charge of Antinomianism as being "as far removed from [Mair] as darkness from light") and minister William Gusthart. Nonetheless, Mair was not appointed to the church in Rotterdam.

Instead, on 16 February 1737, he left the Church, and two days later joined the Associate Presbytery of the Secession. It was he who read the Secession's Declinature on 17 May 1739 to the Assembly of the Church of Scotland. As an objector to the Burgess Oath, he became the moderator of the Associate Presbytery's Synod, picking the Anti-Burgher side when it later split in the Breach of 1747. In 1740, he, alongside the other secessionist ministers, were all formally deposed from office by the Assembly.

When Mair was deposed, he and his congregation were prevented from using the parish church building. Early accounts state that they worshipped in the open air until 1742, at which point they were able to begin using a church building that they had themselves built in Milnathort, named the "Muckle Kirk". Small contradicts them, pointing out that contrary to accounts that Mair and his congregation were evicted in 1740, they in fact continued to use the parish church building until 1742, when the General Assembly's attention became drawn to this and it empowered the Presbytery of Dumfermline to enforce their deposition order and "to crave the assistance of the civil power if necessary". Mair himself recorded in his diary that he lost his stipend and was supported instead by a collection that was taken amongst his parishioners.

The Muckle Kirk was so named because in addition to it having seating inside for 1200 people (another point where Small, on the basis of what is actually recorded in the manager's books, corrects the earlier authorities who had claimed 2000 people), its hillside location presented a natural amphitheatre at the rear of the building, allowing folding doors to the rear to open out for more congregants to attend services outside. It was later to be known as the Orwell Free Kirk and stood in what is now Viewfar Road. When the congregation shrank in later years, after the congregants from Kinross, Milnathort, and Balgedie withdrew from attendance, it was demolished to be replaced in 1821 by a smaller church on the same site that seated just 550 people.

== Ejection and later life ==
Mair later came to disagree with the Associate Presbytery over a point of doctrine, and was ejected by the Anti-Burghers in 1755 "as an erroneous person, for maintaining that Christ, in some sense, died for all mankind". The point at issue was based upon a Treatise on Justifying Faith that had been written, but never published, by a colleague of Mair's father at Culross, one Fraser of Brae. It had only been published posthumously, and had received condemnation at the instigation of Adam Gib by the Anti-Burgher Synod. Mair himself had, as a young boy, transcribed the treatise for his father. He did not hold with Fraser's Treatise in toto, but he stood up for the orthodoxy, in general terms, of his father's friend. The point of contention between Mair and the Synod was the notion of Christ dying for everyone's sins, the elect and non-elect alike, the Synod not holding with the idea of a universal gospel to all mankind. Mair's one lasting statement on the matter was the idea of the "common benefits" of Christ's salvation, including "every cup of cold water enjoyed by the unsaved".

However, he continued his ministry, and it is reported that the majority of his parishioners continued with him. There were petitions made in 1766 and 1767 for his restoration to membership of the church, but they were refused, by Adam Gib and others.

== Death and legacy ==
Mair died of what was termed "paralysis" on 17 February 1768. His Covenant of Duties was published posthumously, a series of nine sermons that he had preached years earlier, none of which had any bearing upon the doctrinal point that caused his split with the Anti-Burghers.

His epitaph on his grave in the churchyard at Orwell, reads:

Muse, passenger, as you this stone walk by,
And gravely think that underneath it ly
Some relics of a much-enlightened Seer,
Triumphant now among the heavenly Quire,
Elijah-like — for zeal, on earth opprest —
Removed from strife, he dwells serene in rest.
Twice twenty years he preached to numbers round;
How glad were all who heard the joyful sound!
Orwell, with tears, your guide withdrawn deplore;
Mourn for your loss — this Prophet mourns no more.
A soul Physician, skilled with hearts to deal.
Sores to rap up, and bleeding wounds to heal.
Many have felt his doctrine drop as balm.
And blessed the man God sent their minds to calm.
I end my plaint — Mair sings (where praises flow)
Redeeming Love — his darling theme below.

== Works ==
- Mair, Thomas (1756). Reasons of Dissent from the Act of the Associate Synod anent Doctrine. Edinburgh.
- Mair, Thomas (1764). The Case laid open: or, an Essay to satisfy those who desire Information anent the strange Breach between the Associate Synod and Mr Mair. Edinburgh.
- Mair, Thomas (1768). A Covenant of Duties, in nowise inconsistent with a Covenant of Grace. Edinburgh.
