= Church Patronage (Scotland) Act 1874 =

Act of the Parliament of the United Kingdom

Church Patronage (Scotland) Act 1874 (Note: The citation of this act by this short title was authorised by section 1 of, and the first schedule to, the Short Titles Act 1896. Due to the repeal of those provisions it is now authorised by section 19(2) of the Interpretation Act 1978.)
- Act of Parliament
- Parliament of the United Kingdom
- Long title: An Act to alter and amend the laws relating to the Appointment of Ministers to Parishes in Scotland.
- Citation: 37 & 38 Vict. c. 82
- Territorial extent: Scotland (Note: Section 1.)

Dates
- Royal assent: 7 August 1874
- Commencement: 1 January 1875 (Note: Section 2.)
Other legislation
Repeals/revokes	Church Patronage (Scotland) Act 1711; Benefices (Scotland) Act 1843
Amended by	Statute Law Revision Act 1883; Statute Law Revision (No. 2) Act 1893; Abolition of Feudal Tenure etc. (Scotland) Act 2000

Status: Partially repealed

Text of statute as originally enacted

Revised text of statute as amended

Text of the Church Patronage (Scotland) Act 1874 as in force today (including any amendments) within the United Kingdom, from legislation.gov.uk.

The Church Patronage (Scotland) Act 1874 (37 & 38 Vict. c. 82) or the Veto Act is an act of the Parliament of the United Kingdom. It repealed the Church Patronage (Scotland) Act 1711 (10 Ann. c. 21) (Note: This is the citation in The Statutes of the Realm.).

The Church of Scotland had always opposed the Church Patronage (Scotland) Act 1711 (10 Ann. c. 21), claiming it was contrary to the Treaty of Union between Scotland and England and an unlawful interference by the civil power in purely spiritual matters of Church government, namely the appointment of Ministers. After 163 years of struggle – including annual petitions to Parliament and a series of splits in the Church – the Original Secession of 1733, and the Great Disruption leading to the setting up of the Free Church of Scotland – along with costly defeats in the Court of Session – the abolition of patronage was very welcome to the Church.

Paragraph 3 of the act declared:

The right of electing and appointing ministers to vacant churches and parishes in Scotland is hereby declared to be vested in the congregations of such vacant churches and parishes respectively, subject to such regulations in regard to the mode of naming and proposing such ministers by means of a committee chosen by the congregation, and of conducting the election and of making the appointment by the congregation as may from time to time be framed by the General Assembly of the Church of Scotland, ...

Other paragraphs spelled out definitions, to prevent the Act being subverted by devices or processes used by Patrons in the past, and made it clear that the Church of Scotland would decide on the qualifications required by Ministers, and the bodies and processes which would be involved in any appointment.

The Church of Scotland and a United Free Church of Scotland were reunited in 1929, following the Church of Scotland Act 1921 (11 & 12 Geo. 5. c. 29), though a small remnant of the latter preferred to remain independent.
