= List of listed buildings in Kinclaven, Perth and Kinross =

This is a list of listed buildings in the parish of Kinclaven in Perth and Kinross, Scotland.

== List ==
Name	Location	Date Listed	Grid Ref. (Note: Sometimes known as OSGB36, the grid reference (where provided) is based on the British national grid reference system used by the Ordnance Survey. • "Guide to National Grid". Ordnance Survey. • "Get-a-map". Ordnance Survey.)	Geo-coordinates	Notes	LB Number (Note: Historic Environment Scotland assign a unique alphanumeric identifier to each designated site in Scotland, for listed buildings this always begins with "LB", for example "LB12345".)	Image
Drummond Hall Farmhouse				56°30′29″N 3°27′26″W	Category B	11235	Upload Photo
Ballathie Estate, Lodge (Garage Block)				56°30′57″N 3°23′19″W	Category B	13409	Upload Photo
Kinclaven Churchyard Monument To Alexr. Cabel (Campbell) Bishop Of Brechin, In Churchyard Wall				56°31′51″N 3°22′53″W	Category B	11228	Upload Photo
Laguna. (Original South Part)				56°30′54″N 3°27′20″W	Category C(S)	11236	Upload Photo
Taymount House Including Walled Garden				56°29′27″N 3°25′33″W	Category C(S)	13743	Upload Photo
Ballathie Estate, Gardener's Cottages And Walled Garden				56°31′02″N 3°23′13″W	Category B	13408	Upload Photo
Kinclaven Bridge Over River Tay				56°31′36″N 3°22′05″W	Category B	11232	Upload another image
Kinclaven Parish Church				56°31′51″N 3°22′53″W	Category C(S)	11226	Upload Photo
Kinclaven Churchyard Wall, Tombs Etc				56°31′51″N 3°22′53″W	Category C(S)	11229	Upload Photo
Kinclaven Manse				56°31′48″N 3°22′53″W	Category C(S)	11230	Upload Photo
Kinclaven Castle				56°31′27″N 3°22′12″W	Category B	11231	Upload Photo
Stewart Tower Farmhouse				56°30′34″N 3°28′39″W	Category B	11237	Upload Photo
Ballathie Estate, West Lodge And Gates				56°30′55″N 3°24′24″W	Category B	13410	Upload Photo
Kinclaven Churchyard War Memorial Lychgate				56°31′50″N 3°22′55″W	Category B	11227	Upload Photo
Ballathie House (Hotel)				56°30′54″N 3°23′21″W	Category B	13407	Upload Photo
Stewart Tower Steading				56°30′31″N 3°28′43″W	Category B	12416	Upload Photo
Kirk O' The Muir				56°31′01″N 3°26′40″W	Category A	11233	Upload Photo
Kirk O' The Muir Former Manse				56°30′58″N 3°26′44″W	Category C(S)	11234	Upload Photo

== Key ==
The scheme for classifying buildings in Scotland is:

- Category A: "buildings of national or international importance, either architectural or historic; or fine, little-altered examples of some particular period, style or building type."
- Category B: "buildings of regional or more than local importance; or major examples of some particular period, style or building type, which may have been altered."
- Category C: "buildings of local importance; lesser examples of any period, style, or building type, as originally constructed or moderately altered; and simple traditional buildings which group well with other listed buildings."

In March 2016 there were 47,288 listed buildings in Scotland. Of these, 8% were Category A, and 50% were Category B, with the remaining 42% being Category C.
