= Church Patronage (Scotland) Act 1711 =

Act of the Parliament of Great Britain

- Act of Parliament
- Parliament of Great Britain
- Long title: An Act to restore the Patrons to their ancient Rights of presenting Ministers to the Churches vacant in that Part of Great Britain called Scotland.
- Citation: 10 Ann. c. 21 (Note: This is the citation in The Statutes of the Realm.); 10 Ann. c. 12 (Note: This is the citation in The Statutes at Large.)
- Territorial extent: Great Britain

Dates
- Royal assent: 22 May 1712
- Commencement: 1 May 1712 (Note: Section 1.)
- Repealed: 1 January 1875
Other legislation
Amended by	Promissory Oaths Act 1871
Repealed by	Church Patronage (Scotland) Act 1874

Status: Repealed

Text of statute as originally enacted

The Church Patronage (Scotland) Act 1711 (10 Ann. c. 21), also known as the Patronage Act or the Veto Act, was an act of the Parliament of Great Britain. The long title of the act is An Act to restore the Patrons to their ancient Rights of presenting Ministers to the Churches vacant in that Part of Great Britain called Scotland. Its purpose was to allow the noble and other Patrons in Scotland to gain control over the Church of Scotland parish churches again, having lost that custom in the Glorious Revolution.

== Pre-Reformation ==
The Roman Catholic Church in Scotland received large endowments of land, from the Monarch or landowners, to support Parishes, Abbeys, etc, often with the condition that the donor and his heirs had the right to nominate a suitable cleric or clerics to the enjoy the proceeds of the endowment. In the absence of a specific Patron, the Pope was regarded as the universal Patron. His patronage was exercised through local bishops.

== Reformation ==
The Church in Scotland was Reformed under the guidance of John Knox and other Reformers. The king took over the lands of abbeys and bishoprics, turning many into lordships for his supporters, or giving some of them to universities or town councils. The lands associated with supporting parish clergy – or ministers, as they were now called – were generally undisturbed. The king took over the role of default patron, in the absence of any specific patron. The First Book of Discipline (1560) and the Second Book of Discipline (1578) laid down the rules for the reformed Church of Scotland. Both stipulated that ministers should be chosen by congregations. The First Book never became civil law, and neither did the part of the Second Book relating to patronage, as the right of the heirs of original donors to nominate suitable clerics to a parish was called.

However, by an act of the Parliament of Scotland (1567) presentation by laic (lay) patronages was expressly preserved, the patron being bound to present a qualified person within six months of vacancy occurring. By the same act, an appeal against the presented candidate by the congregation could only be on the basis of the qualifications of the presentee.

By the "Golden Act" of 1592, which established Presbyterianism as the only legal form of Church government in Scotland, Presbyteries were "bound and astricted to receive and admit whatsoever qualified minister is presented be (sic) his Majesty or laic patron". If a congregation refused to accept a suitable nominee, the Patron was entitled to enjoy the fruits of the original bequest - stipend, lands, house, etc.

By the beginning of the 17th century, patronage was well established in custom and law. A patron could be the king, one of the universities, a town or burgh council or a landowner, such as the Duke of Argyle (who had nine patronages).

== Seventeenth century ==
=== Turmoil ===
The Golden Act was repealed as regards Church government by Charles I, but lay Patronage was not repealed. In 1649, just before the execution of Charles I, the Parliament of Scotland passed an Act abolishing Patronage, but it never received royal assent and Scotland was soon overrun by the English. Despite further changes to Church government, (even despite Scotland having been incorporated into, the Puritan Commonwealth of England), Patronage was not formally repealed. Nor was it during the Restoration and the reigns of Charles II and James VII.

=== Glorious Revolution ===
Following the Dutch invasion of England by the Presbyterian William of Orange, the so-called Glorious Revolution definitively restored Presbyterianism as the only legal form of Church government in Scotland. A 1690 Act (again, by the Parliament of Scotland) did not abolish patronage, but vested this power instead in the heritors and elders of each parish, who could propose a candidate to the whole congregation, to be either approved or disapproved by them. If they disapproved, they needed to give their reasons. Disputes were to be resolved by the presbytery. Presbyteries were to pay compensation, typically a year's stipend, to the owner of the abolished patronage, who was to provide a formal, written renunciation in return.

== 1707 – Union of Great Britain ==
The Treaty of Union, signed between Scotland and England in 1706, preserved and guaranteed the separate legal system in Scotland. By separate Acts of Union in the Parliament of Scotland and the Parliament of England, whilst the English Parliament abolished itself the Scottish Parliament was prorogued, and set up a single Parliament of Great Britain. A further act guaranteed the Presbyterian status of the Church of Scotland. It was to be important to future disputes on patronage that the Church of Scotland as a legal corporation had been established by Act of Parliament. Disputes hung upon the differences between the civil benefices (depending upon civil law) and the spiritual benefices (determined by Church law) of the appointment of a Minister.

The treaty and the acts came into force in 1707.

== Patronage Act 1711 ==
Patronage was a much less disputed issue in the Anglican Church, and the dispossessed Scottish lay patrons were able to persuade the united, and mainly Anglican, Parliament of Great Britain that they had unjustly lost a purely civil right. Their case may have been strengthened by the fact that Article 20 of the Treaty of Union had preserved all heritable rights and jurisdictions of pre-Union Scotland. It also helped that the British Government distrusted popular participation in matters of importance, as the selection of parish ministers certainly was. Consequently, the Church Patronage (Scotland) Act 1711 was passed, restoring to their original owners the right to present suitably qualified candidates to Presbyteries in the event of a vacancy. Only those Patrons who had renounced their claim in writing in return for compensation were excluded from this, of which there were only three in 1711, Cadder, Old and New Monklands. The effect was the restoration of the situation as it was in 1592. Patrons were required to swear allegiance to the Hanoverian kings, and abjure the claims of the Stuart Pretenders; a patron who refused was to appoint commissioners to exercise the patronage on his behalf. Patrons did not need to be members of the Church of Scotland.

The act came into force on 1 May 1712.

== Disputes ==
=== Moderates acquiesce reluctantly ===
The Church of Scotland mainly acquiesced in this restoration, though it felt aggrieved and the General Assembly protested to Parliament almost every year that it was contrary to the Treaty of Union. The congregation of a Parish could only legally object to a presentee on the grounds of his suitability, so the General Assembly of the Church of Scotland laid down increasingly stringent educational, moral and practical qualifications for candidates for the ministry. Moreover, few patrons dared to suggest scandalously unqualified candidates.

Appointments were, however, regularly contested through the church courts - Kirk Session, Presbytery and Synod finally to be decided at the General Assembly of the Church of Scotland. As most objections were on the acceptability of the candidate, rather than his suitability, the Assembly usually decided in favour of the Patron, particularly as he could seek civil damages in the Court of Session otherwise.

The civil courts were involved because disputes related to the stipends and property of Parishes, to ownership of the property of the right to Patronage, who had the right to exercise it and whether time limits had been breached.

Eventually, as most ministers owed their appointment to a patron, they were unwilling to challenge the system. Many were also wary of more democratic involvement in Church governance. The status of the Church itself had been guaranteed by Act of Parliament, so it tended towards supporting legal procedures, though it protested against them. Many patrons were wary of provoking disputes, so tried to work with the heritors and elders of their parishes to present candidates who met with General Assembly criteria in terms of education, character and practical ability. This group of ministers, heritors, elders and patrons – called Moderates - formed the dominant group in the Church of Scotland during the 18th century.

=== Evangelicals oppose on principle ===
Other Ministers, Heritors and Elders objected to Patronage on principle, as compromising the independence of the Church and the right of congregations freely to call their own Ministers. They viewed the whole of the 17th century as a struggle to achieve this, most notably during the Covenanter disturbances, culminating in the victory of the Glorious Revolution. Later, this Party of principled opposition was called the Evangelicals. It became dominant in the 19th century. Moreover, the buying and selling of church offices - Simony - was against Church law. When a Patron tried to sell his right (or, more normally, when this was advertised as part of the sale of an estate), the cry of Simony was raised. As no money passed to Ministers or from Ministers to Patrons, this charge had moral force, but no legal effect, either in Church or civil courts. Discontented Parishioners had many options open to them at every level of Church and Civil courts to question the suitability of a candidate, on educational, moral, or practical grounds, but more normally on the firmness of his attachment to the Westminster Confession of Faith. They could also query the right of a particular Patron, or his Commissioner, or the timing, or formal wording of a particular presentation, or whether formal Church processes had been properly carried out.

In addition to formal, legal opposition, many disputed appointments were occasions for popular demonstrations of discontent, sometimes linked to political demands for more democracy. Presbyteries were empowered to call in the army to impose a disputed appointment.

== Outcome ==
The act was highly opposed by the Church of Scotland because of its intrusion into church elections and was considered lay investiture. The General Assembly of 1712, inserted a clause in the instructions to its Commissioners to protest to Parliament and this instruction was repeated annually until 1784. However, due to the strength of the aristocracy, the act remained in force for a considerable length of time. It was finally repealed by section 3 of the Church Patronage (Scotland) Act 1874 (37 & 38 Vict. c. 82).

=== Eighteenth-century legislation ===
An act of Parliament, 1719, required any presentee to declare his willingness to take up his patron's offer, to prevent a patron from presenting a candidate whom he knew would not take up a post, in order to profit himself from the stipend. Many optimistically thought this was the end of patronage, as no right-thinking Presbyterian would declare willingness to accept a patron's offer, but after an uncertain few years, patronage continued as the norm.

=== 1730 General Assembly ===
An Act by the General Assembly of 1730, by which objectors to decisions of Church courts could no longer have these objections officially recorded, was regarded by Evangelicals as a move to silence their opposition to Patronage.

=== 1732 General Assembly ===
When a Patron failed to nominate a candidate for a vacancy within six months, his right of Patronage fell to the Presbytery. Each Presbytery proceeded as it saw fit, but the General Assembly of 1732 passed an Act which regulated this, by establishing the 1690 rules, granting the Patronage right to the Heritors and Elders, with procedures to be followed if a congregation objected to a candidate. Some members, including Ebenezer Erskine wanted to see the regulations of 1649 applied, by which all heads of families in a congregation called a Minister. The fact that they could no longer have their objections recorded led to the first schism in the Church of Scotland - the Original Secession.

=== Veto Act ===
The General Assembly of 1834 enacted the Veto Act, which prohibited the installation of a patron-presented minister in a congregation if the heads of a majority of member households objected to him and gave their reasons to the presbytery. This event marked the end of the dominance of the Moderates and showed the strength of the Evangelicals.

=== Great Disruption 1843 ===
A series of civil actions in the period 1838 - 1841 in the Court of Session, and confirmed in the House of Lords declared the above Veto Act ultra vires, so it was unenforceable by law. They also indicated that the Church of Scotland, having been set up by statute, was subject to the law of the land in all civil matters. Its Presbyteries were liable to severe financial penalties if they resisted Patron's nominees using the Veto Act. Court orders were made forbidding the ordination of Ministers who might harm the interests of a Patron's nominee. This led to the Great Disruption of 1843 - a walk-out of about 40% of the Ministers, led by Thomas Chalmers - and the setting up of the Free Church of Scotland. This Church at the time had no doctrinal or theological difference with the majority of Ministers who remained in the Church of Scotland, but it contained the greater proportion of evangelical ministers. Those who remained within the Church of Scotland were determined to remain within the law, and in 1874 they secured abolition of the Patronage Act.

=== Abolition ===
By the Church Patronage (Scotland) Act 1874 (37 & 38 Vict. c. 82), 163 years after the 1711 act, lay patronage was abolished for the Church of Scotland, thus enabling presbyteries to follow canon law in the choice of ministers. Initially, ministers were chosen by a meeting of all the heads of households and elders, but a sophisticated process of trials was then developed, which by the second half of the twentieth century, also allowed women a voice in the selection of ministers. The General Assembly introduced the innovation of deaconesses in 1898, created the concept of women elders in 1966, and the concept of women ministers in 1968.

== Subsequent developments ==
Section 6 of the act was repealed by section 1 of, and part II of schedule one to, the Promissory Oaths Act 1871 (34 & 35 Vict. c. 48), which came into force on 13 July 1871.

== Bibliography ==
- Hetherington, W M History of the Church of Scotland ... to 1841 Johnstone, Edinburgh, 1842
- The select antipatronage library consisting chiefly of reprints of scarce pamphlets connected with lay-patronage in the Church of Scotland John Johnstone, Edinburgh, 1842
- Stevens, A J The Statutes Relating to the Ecclesiastical and Eleemosynary Institutions of England, ... etc' Vol I, Parker, London, 1843
- The Gentleman's Magazine, Vol V, J Murray, Edinburgh 1735
- Gillan, Robert An abridgment of the acts of the General Assemblies of the Church of Scotland: from the year 1638 to 1820 inclusive, to which is subjoined an Appendix containing an abridged view of the civil law relating to the Church General Assembly, Edinburgh, 1821
- Dunbar, W H et al, The Scottish Jurist: containing reports of cases decided in the House of Lords, Courts of Session, Teinds, and Exchequer, and the Jury and Justiciary Courts Vol X Michael Anderson, Edinburgh, 1838
- Bell, William (revised by Ross, G) A Dictionary and Digest of the Law of Scotland, with short explanations of the most ordinary English law terms' Bell & Bradfute, Edinburgh, 1861
- Innes, A T The law of creeds in Scotland: a treatise on the legal relation of churches in Scotland established and not established, to their doctrinal confessions Blackwood, Edinburgh, 1867
- Argyle, Duke of, Speeches of His Grace the Duke of Argyll on the Church Patronage (Scotland) Bill, 2d and 10th June 1874. Blackwood, Edinburgh, 1874
- Coffey, John Politics, religion and the British revolutions: the mind of Samuel Rutherford Cambridge University Press 1997
