= Alexander Moncrieff (minister) =

Scottish Presbyterian minister (1613–1688)

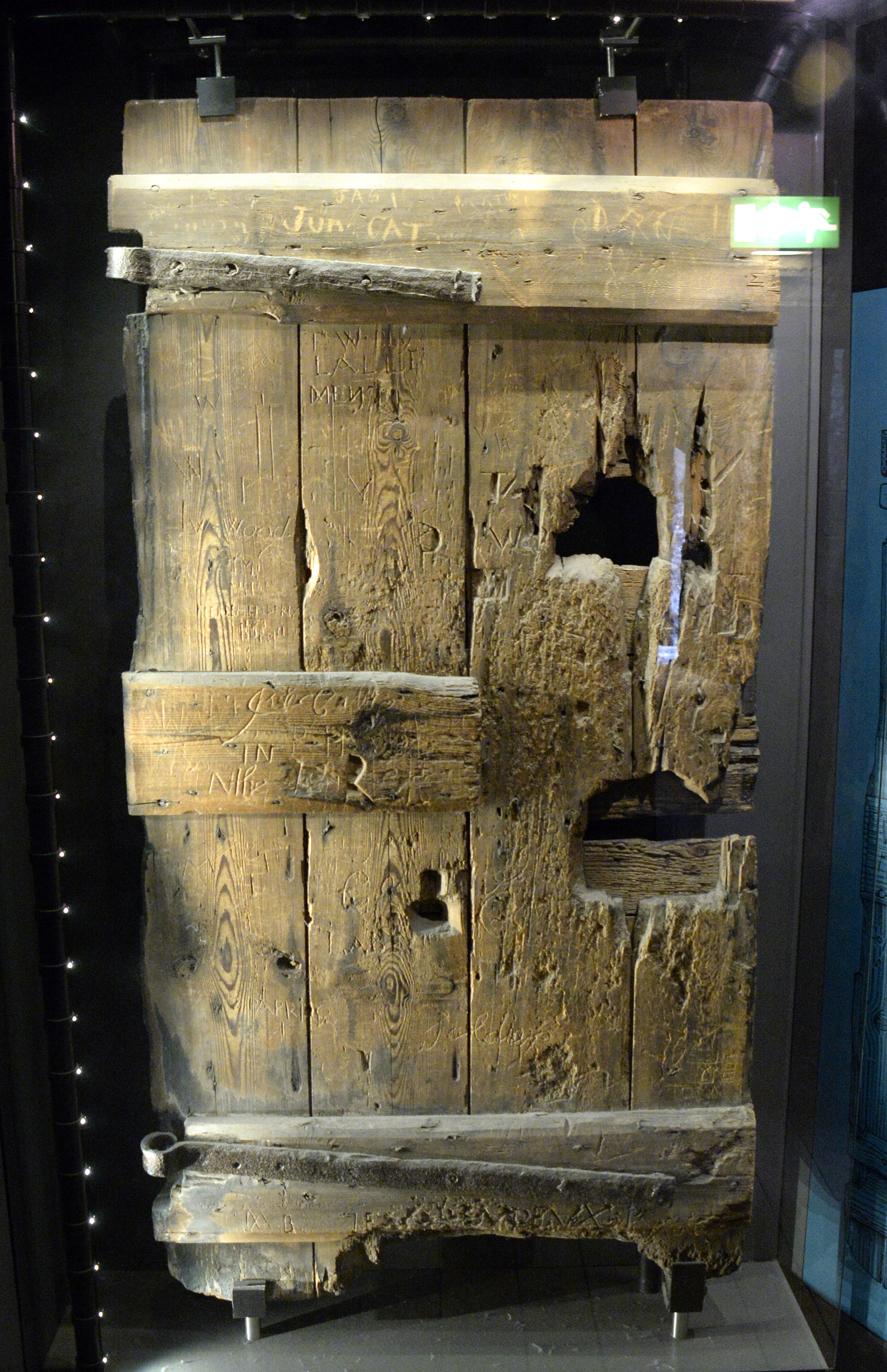
- Door from Edinburgh Castle (house arrest and here Aug 1660-July 1661)
- Church: Scoonie

Personal details
- Born: or Moncreiff; 1613 Scotland
- Died: 6 October 1688 (aged 74–75)
- Denomination: Church of Scotland
- Education: University of Edinburgh

Alexander Moncrieff (c. 1613 — 6 October 1688) was a Scottish Christian preacher. A supporter of the Scottish Reformation, he refused to follow the episcopal church of the king of England, and preached as a Covenanter; he was arrested for treason and barred from preaching in Scotland.

== Overview ==
Moncrieff was born in 1613, the youngest of seven children of Matthew Moncrieff of Kintillo; he graduated from the University of Edinburgh in 1635, and began preaching immediately. In 1643 he became the minister of Scoonie parish.

He subscribed to the Scottish Solemn League and Covenant on 31st December 1648 and followed the presbyterian system of Christian leadership, rather than the episcopal system supported by the royal family.

In August 1660, the royal Committee of Estates sat in Edinburgh; they decided to arrest ‘protesting ministers’ and Moncrieff, his brother-in-law John Murray, Robert Traill and James Guthrie were imprisoned in Edinburgh Castle. Guthrie was publicly hanged on 1 June 1661.

Moncrieff was tried and his sentence was passed on July 12th 1661; he was banned from holding any public office (including religious work) within the kingdom. After his sentencing, he travelled around Scotland and continued to preach. Legal judgements were passed against him and others, in 1672, 1674 and 1677 for holding illegal outdoor church meetings, but he avoided arrest.

Moncrieff married Anna Murray, daughter of Rev. Robert Murray and they had four sons and three daughters (two of whom became preachers). His grandson, also Alexander Moncrieff, was one of the first four ministers of the Secession Church.

Moncrieff died on 6th October 1688 and was buried in the churchyard of Greyfriars, Edinburgh; Anna died on 25th October 1704.

== Early life and ministry ==
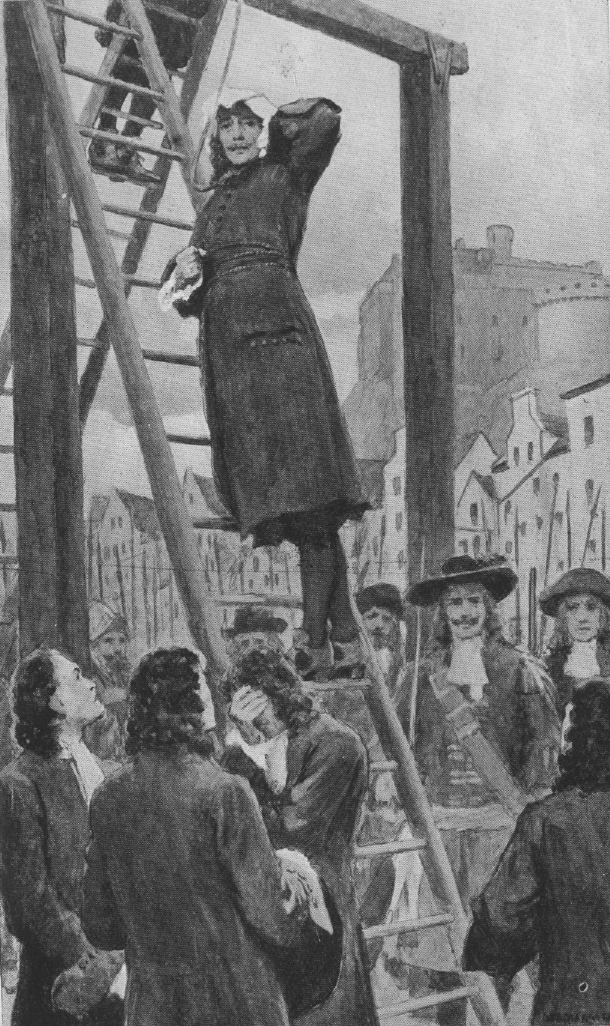
Execution of James Guthrie (1 June 1661) next to Edinburgh's Mercat Cross (then located on the High Street); Moncrieff's fellow prisoner and the second man, after the Duke of Argyll, to be executed for high treason after the Restoration of 1660.

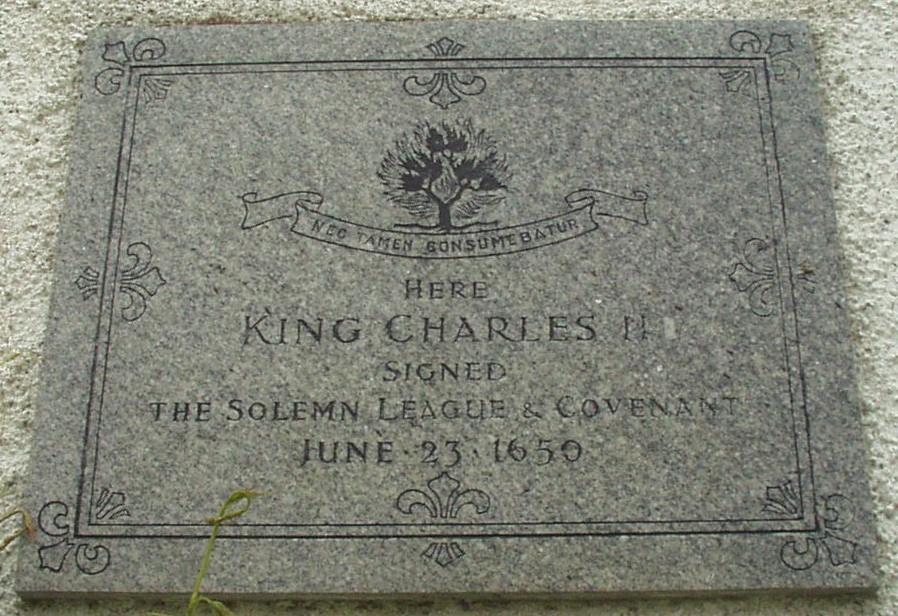
Plaque marking the signing of the Solemn League and Covenant by Charles II.

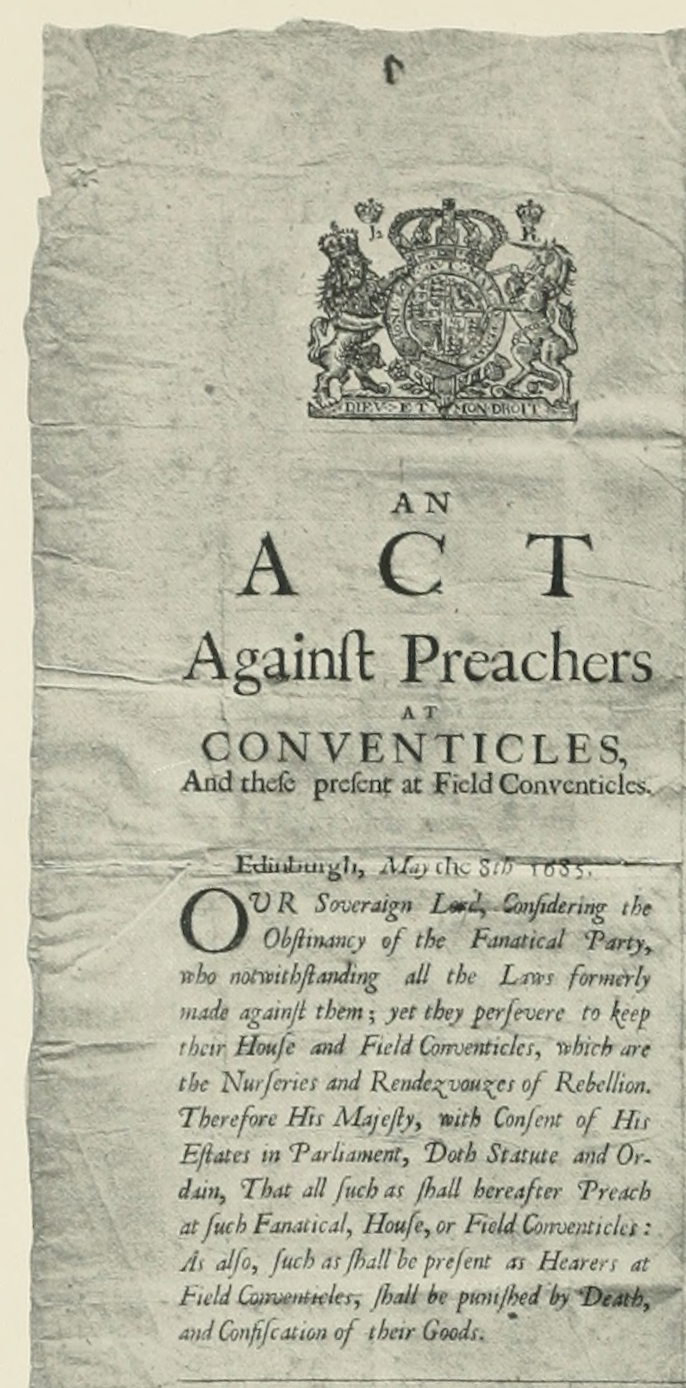
The Scottish Parliament on 8 May 1685, have recorded the following : Our sovereign Lord, considering the obstinacy of the fanatical party who, notwithstanding all the laws formerly made against them, still keep their house and field conventicles, which are the nurseries and rendezvouses of rebellion; therefore His Majesty, with consent of Parliament, ordains that all such persons who shall hereafter preach at such house or field conventicles, also those who shall be present as hearers, shall be punished by death and confiscation of their goods.

Moncrieff was born in Kintillo, a hamlet near Bridge-of-Earn, in 1613.

Moncrieff was awarded a degree of Master of Arts from Edinburgh. He was on the list to become a minister in Kirkcaldy in 1631, but missed out. When Scoonie, near Leven in Fife became vacant, Moncrieff was one of the applicants for the post, and he had the honour of being presented by Charles I in June 1643. In September of the same year he was ordained to the pastorate of the Scoonie parish. The year of Moncrieff's ordination was an important year in the history of the churches of the Fife. In October the Solemn League and Covenant was subscribed at Dunfermline, and the ancient city gave the key note to the other Presbyterian churches in Fife. Before Moncrieff had been many weeks in Scoonie he showed that his leanings were entirely with the Reformation party. When the Church became broken up into factions he took the side of the stricter Presbyterians or Protesters, and as a Protester he was persecuted almost to the death. A contemporary account of his character is, that he was "a godly, sincere, and painful minister, and fixed to his principles."

He subscribed the Solemn League and Covenant on 31 December 1648; and was one of the Commissioners appointed to visit the University of St Andrews in January 1649.

== Revolutioners versus protesters ==
The contentions of the Revolutioners and Protesters arose. Brethren contended with the bitterness of enemies against each other. Taylor gives his opinion that "It is not very easy, even with the calmest study, to understand the complications of the controversy. And at the time, it would be very difficult for an upright mind to satisfy itself, in all circumstances, as to the path of duty. There were good Christian men arrayed on both sides." It was to the Protesters that Moncrieff chiefly attached himself, although in many particulars we find him acting an independent part. In common with the Protesters he was willing to submit to the Protectorate of Cromwell. Yet we find him suffering from the annoyance of Cromwell's soldiers. "1652. Jul. 25. Some days before they did beginne to quarter some of their foot upon Mr Alex. Moncriefe, min. of Sconie, this being the first time that ministers quartered either foot or horse in this shyre."

== After the Restoration of Charles II ==
It was, however, when Charles II was restored in 1660, that Mr Moncrieff was subjected to real persecution. For a short summary of the times from a Presbyterian perspective a work like Anderson's introduction to his Martyrs of the Bass might be consulted. As far back as 1650 Moncreiff had been convinced, along with James Guthrie and Samuel Rutherford and the leading Protesters, of the faithless character of the second Charles. In that year the Western Remonstrance was drawn up, demanding clearer evidence of the righteousness and sincerity of Charles' principles and feelings, before entrusting him with kingly power. These attempts at personal dealing, Charles resented. The abettors of this Western Remorstrance were selected as the chief objects of his ire. In 1660, he along with other ministers was apprehended while drawing up an address of congratulation to Charles II, which at the same time reminded him of the obligations under which he ascended the throne. Though his life was threatened, and he was imprisoned, first in Edinburgh Castle, and then warded in houses, nothing could make him recant. Mr Moncrieff was imprisoned in Edinburgh Castle, along with James Guthrie of Stirling, and several others of the Protesters. In 1661 darker measures were determined on. The Marquis of Argyle was beheaded on May 27. James Guthrie was led forth to execution on June 1. Moncrieff, being Mr Guthrie's fellow-prisoner, looked for nothing else than that his turn should come next. He was summoned before the Lords of the Articles, and, with death before him, refused to acknowledge any fault in the Remonstrance, either in "respect of matter, manner, or timing of it." But a milder sentence, through the intervention of the Earl of Crawford, satisfied their Lordships. They discharged Mr Moncrieff having any employment, ecclesiastical or civil, in the parish of Scoonie for all time coming. They prohibited him from coming within three miles of Scoonie, and silenced him from preaching.

== Conditional release ==
The next step followed in 1662, when an Episcopal incumbent was ordained at Scoonie in Moncrieffs place. The imposition of bishops by the king who outranked ministers and kirk sessions and therefore could control the church resulted in conflict with Presbyterians who believed in the divine right of Presbytery. "Augt. llth. The Archprelate (Sharpe) came to St Andrews, and before he returned to Edinburgh he rilled honest Mr Alex. Moncriffs place at Scoonie, by intruding Mr Jo. Ramsay, a minister of Angus, in that parish; none of the other heritors (Athernie and Finges) countenancing the intrusion, save Durie, the avowed enemy of Mr Moncriff. Mr Joshua Meldrum, min. of Kingorn, preached on the day of admission. After sermon ended, he took his promise to be faithfull in his charge of that flock, and ther was delivered to him the Bibell, the keys of the church doore, and the bell-tow." Moncreiff was released, but banished from his flock, and was compelled to take up residence at a distance of not less than ten miles from the seat of a Bishop, and not less than seven miles from a county town. For a time he lived in a quiet place in the Highlands, and, then, owing to the need of educating his children, he came to Perth. At first a few resorted to him to hear the Gospel, but afterwards a great many attended his services. Subsequently, he removed to Edinburgh. Here he had many narrow escapes. On one occasion, a captain with some soldiers searched every house in the close where he was staying except the one where he was living, though its door stood wide open.

== Intercommuned ==
On 16 July 1664, a decree was passed against him and others for holding conventicles, and on the 23 the Magistrates of Perth were appointed to seize him as a "noted keeper of conventicles in and about Perth." In the hope of exterminating the men of the Moncrieff school, the Archbishop had recourse to the punishment of intercommuning. When the sentence of intercommuning was passed upon any one, even his nearest relatives were prohibited, under severe penalties, from extending a friendly hand to him or ministering in any way to his needs or comforts. Sir Walter Scott speaks of the sentence of intercommuning as the work of the "Prince of the Power of the Air." Moncrieff had this awful sentence pronounced upon his head. For 27 years he was buffeted and driven from place to place, having many hairbreadth escapes, and if not beaten with many stripes, he certainly had many hardships to endure.

The sentence of intercommuning was imposed against Moncrieff in 1675. Moncreiff was outlawed and estranged from human beings. Under threat of these punishments he was forced to lurk for years, hiding in corners, preaching only to a few who heard it at the peril of their lives. There are several stories of how he escaped from the king's men. He was often urged to leave the country for safety, and was called to Derry. He always said, however, that he “preferred to suffer where he had sinned and that he would endeavour to keep possession of the house [the land of his nativity] till its Lord should return to it,” and he lived to see 1688 and the Revolution.

== Family ==
He married: Anna (died 25 October 1704, aged 84), daughter of Robert Murray of Woodend, minister of Methven, and had issue —

- Matthew, who succeeded his uncle in estate of Culfargie. Matthew's son, also Alexander Moncrieff, was one of the first four ministers of the Secession Church, and was often called Culfargie.
- William, minister of Largo;
- John, minister of Trinity Parish, Edinburgh;
- Robert, clerk to the Privy Council 1689;
- Anna (married 1681, Hugh Cunningham, Lord Provost of Edinburgh);
- Margaret (married, cont. 1 December 1691, Alexander Swyne, bailie of Dysart);
- Elizabeth (marr. Andrew Wardroper, minister of Ballingry).

== Epitaph ==
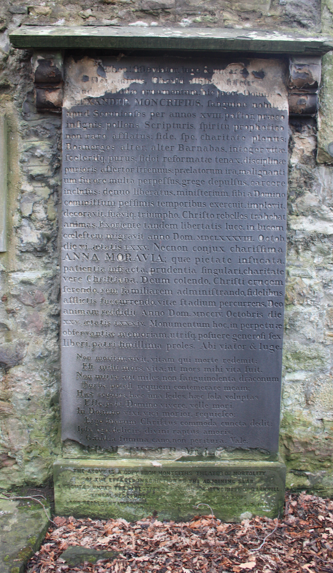
The grave of Alexander Moncrieff, Greyfriars Kirkyard

The following epitaph to Moncrieff and his wife was erected on a monument and recorded before it faded at Greyfriars Kirkyard in Edinburgh.
Alas ! stay passenger, mourn and marvel The friend of God, Christ's faithful champion, the great ornament of the church, here lies Mr. Alexander Moncrieff, of honourable parentage, minister at Scoonie for the space of 18 years, a notable preacher, powerful in the scriptures, not seldom inspired with a spirit of prophecy; full of faith, hope, and charity, another Barnabas, another Boanerges, upright in life and pure from wickedness; keeping fast to the reformed faith; a stout maintainer of the most pure discipline; who, having suffered many things from the ire of prelates and fury of malignants, being thrust from his charge, shut up in prison; at length being set at freedom, he exercised, fulfilled and adorned the ministry committed to him by the Lord, in the worst of times, and, by a sweet triumph, drew rebellions souls unto Christ. At last, at the dawning of the day of liberty, he was removed into heavenly light, 6 October, the year of our Lord, 1688. Of his age 75. Here also lies his dearest spouse, Anna Murray, who running the course of her life, by unfeigned piety, unshaken patience, singular prudence, true Christian charily, worshipping God, bearing the cross of Christ, managing her lawful affairs, and helping the faithful in affliction, surrendered her soul to God, 25 October 1704. Of her age 84. In token of their perpetual respect, their six generous children an offspring very like their father, erected this monument for both their parents.

Reader, or passenger, be gone and mourn.
He lives, dies not, who life by death redeemed;
Life as death, and death as life esteemed :
My rest cannot be troubled by dragoons.
Nor soldiers, nor prelates in their gowns;
My sole repose, my seat, my only joy

To suffer, die, and live to God, thought I;
In Christ I liv'd, o'rcame, I die, I rest:
Of Christ's reward and gains I am possest
Hence, ravish'd with delights of divine love,
I sing eternal songs the stars above.
So passenger farewell : you read what here :
You're hard as stone if you drop not a tear.

== Works ==
- Letter while in Confinement to Mrs Moncreiff (Christian Mag., vii.)

== Wodrow's account of Moncrief ==
Wodrow records that during the usurpation, Mr Alexander Moncrief was persecuted by the English for his loyalty to the king, and his constant praying for him. His house was many times searched and rifled by the English, and he obliged to hide. Upon the Sabbath he had spies set upon him, and was closely watched where he went after preaching. Frequently he was hotly pursued; and one time a party of horse came after him when fleeing, and, though attacked twice by them, by his own fortitude and resolution he got clear of them, and escaped. He records that at another time in a neighbouring congregation he was seized, and imprisoned some time, merely for praying for the king.

Being shortly after release Moncrieff was urged as a person of great courage and boldness, to present the protestation and petition against the toleration, and other encroachments upon the church and state, in October, 1658, signed by himself and several other ministers of Fife, to General Monk. This he did with the greatest firmness, and it exposed him further to the extremities of that time. In return, what he got, on 23 August, was to be seized when petitioning according to law. He seems to have continued under confinement till 12 July; and everybody, and he himself expected to be hanged.

Moncrieff seems to have been accused of writing works called "Remonstrance", and of making the "Causes of God's Wrath"; and he refused to retract any thing in them. He was several times brought before the parliament. Pressure was also put on his wife and she too had to answer questions. Mr Moncrief seems to have been highly respected, by people in all walks of life and they plead on his behalf which softened the attitude of the government. His trial dragged on and after a tedious imprisonment, he fell sick, and obtained the favour of confinement to a chamber in Edinburgh. The parliament passed the following sentence upon him, on 12 July:

"The king's majesty and estates of parliament, having considered the report of the lords of articles anent the process against Mr Alexander Moncrief, minister of Scoonie, and his own carriage before them, in owning his accession to the "Remonstrance" and "Causes of God's Wrath," do accordingly declare the said Mr Alexander to be for ever incapable of exercising any public trust, civil or ecclesiastic, and also discharge him of all public trust, civil or ecclesiastic, within this kingdom, until, in the next session of parliament, further order be taken concerning him, and discharge him in the meantime to go to the said parish."

After this sentence, when living peaceably some eight or nine miles from his parish, people began to resort to him, and hear him preach in his own family; whereupon, under a most severe storm in the middle of winter, he was charged to remove from his house, and required to live twenty miles from his charge, and seven or eight miles from a bishop's seat or royal burgh, and was with his family forced from his house, and obliged to wander in that great storm. When he had transported his furniture to a place at a competent distance, even there he got a second charge to remove to a further distance, till he was obliged to transport his family to a remote place in the Highlands.

After this, the persecution somewhat abating, he brought his family to Perth for the education of his children, where he continued preaching the gospel; a few at first, but afterwards a great many attended his ministry. Being informed against, a party of the horse guards were sent to apprehend him, but he escaped, though his house was narrowly and rudely searched. This forced him from his family, and he was obliged to go into hiding a good while. At length he came in with his family to Edinburgh, where he preached the gospel many years in private, under a series of trouble and persecution.

He was intercommuned, as we shall hear, and his house and many other places in and about the city narrowly searched for him, yet he was always marvellously hid. Many instances might be given when he went to the country. Many times parties of the guards were sent in quest of him, and sometimes he would meet them in his return, and pass through them unknown. When he was lodged in a remote part of the suburbs of Edinburgh, a captain with a party of the regular troops searched every house and chamber of the close, save the house where he lodged, into which they never entered, though the door was open. Wodrow records several other narrow escapes. Wodrow also records that when the pressure was greatest would split up his family. He did not leave Scotland although he had offers for example from Derry.

In a later chapter Wodrow refers to a petition presented by Moncrieff to the Privy Council, when residing at Reidie in December 1664, for permission to go to Edinburgh, where his "personal presence" was required in connection with a legal process. The Council granted him licence accordingly for a period of six days, "upon bond to live peaceably and loyally during that time."

Moncrieff was considered by the Duke of Hamilton to be one of the greatest opponents to the Indulgence granted by the Privy Council in 1669. Decreets were passed against him and others, in 1672- and 1674, for holding conventicles; and the magistrates of Perth were appointed to seize him as a "noted keeper of conventicles" in and about that city. Letters of intercommuning were also issued against him, along with Alexander Durham of Largo, in the following year, when he fled to the Highlands; and he was cited, with others, to appear before the Council on 11 August 1677.

He died 6 October 1688, and was buried in Greyfriars Kirkyard, Edinburgh. The grave lies south-west of the church, behind the Adam mausoleum.
