= Ebenezer Erskine =

Scottish minister

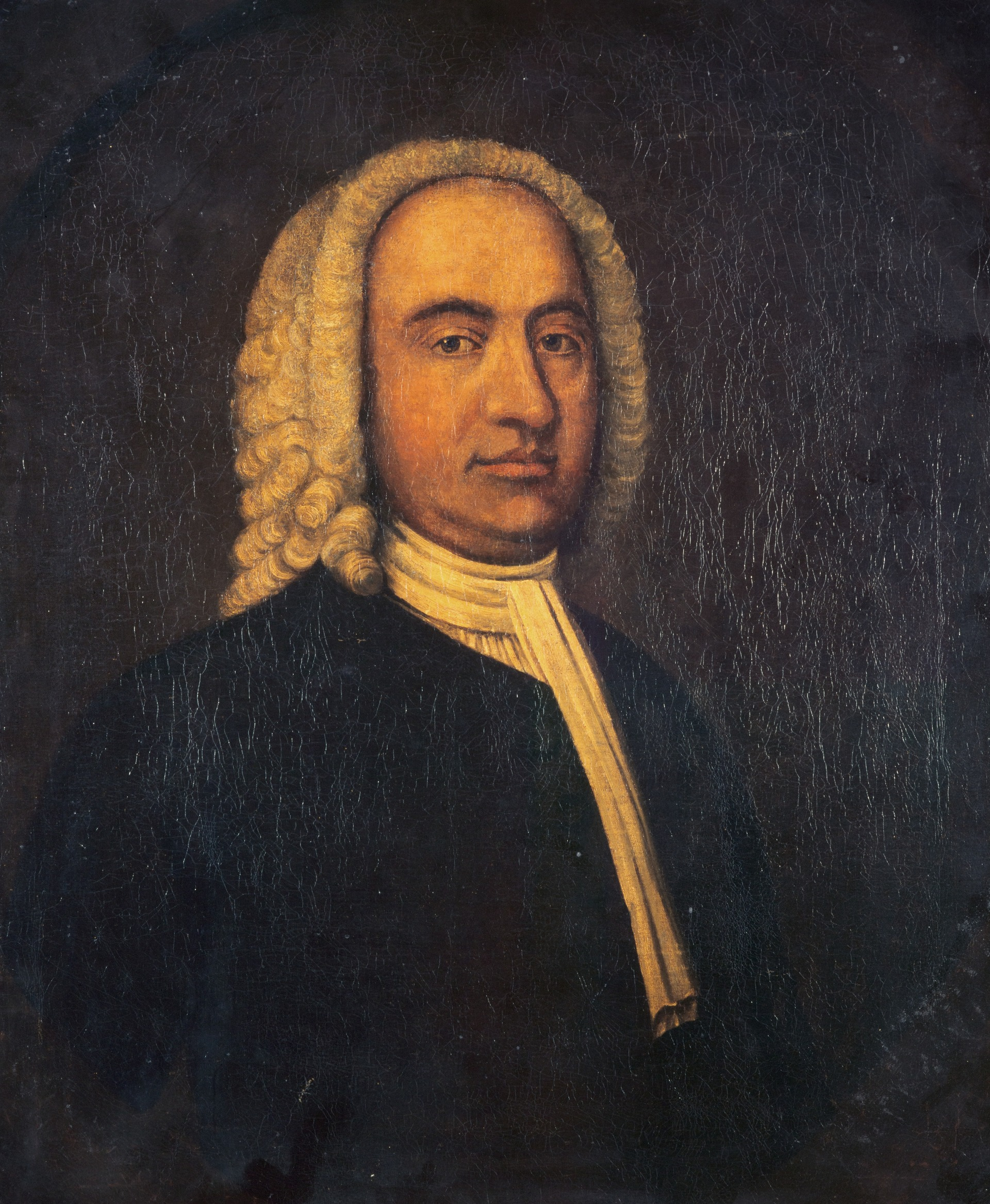
- Ebenezer Erskine (unknown artist) National Galleries Scotland
- Born: 22 June 1680
- Died: 2 June 1754 (aged 73)
- Education: University of Edinburgh
- Occupations: Pastor, Theologian
- Theological work
- Tradition or movement: (1) Church of Scotland (2) Associate Presbytery/ Secession Church (3) Burgher Seceder

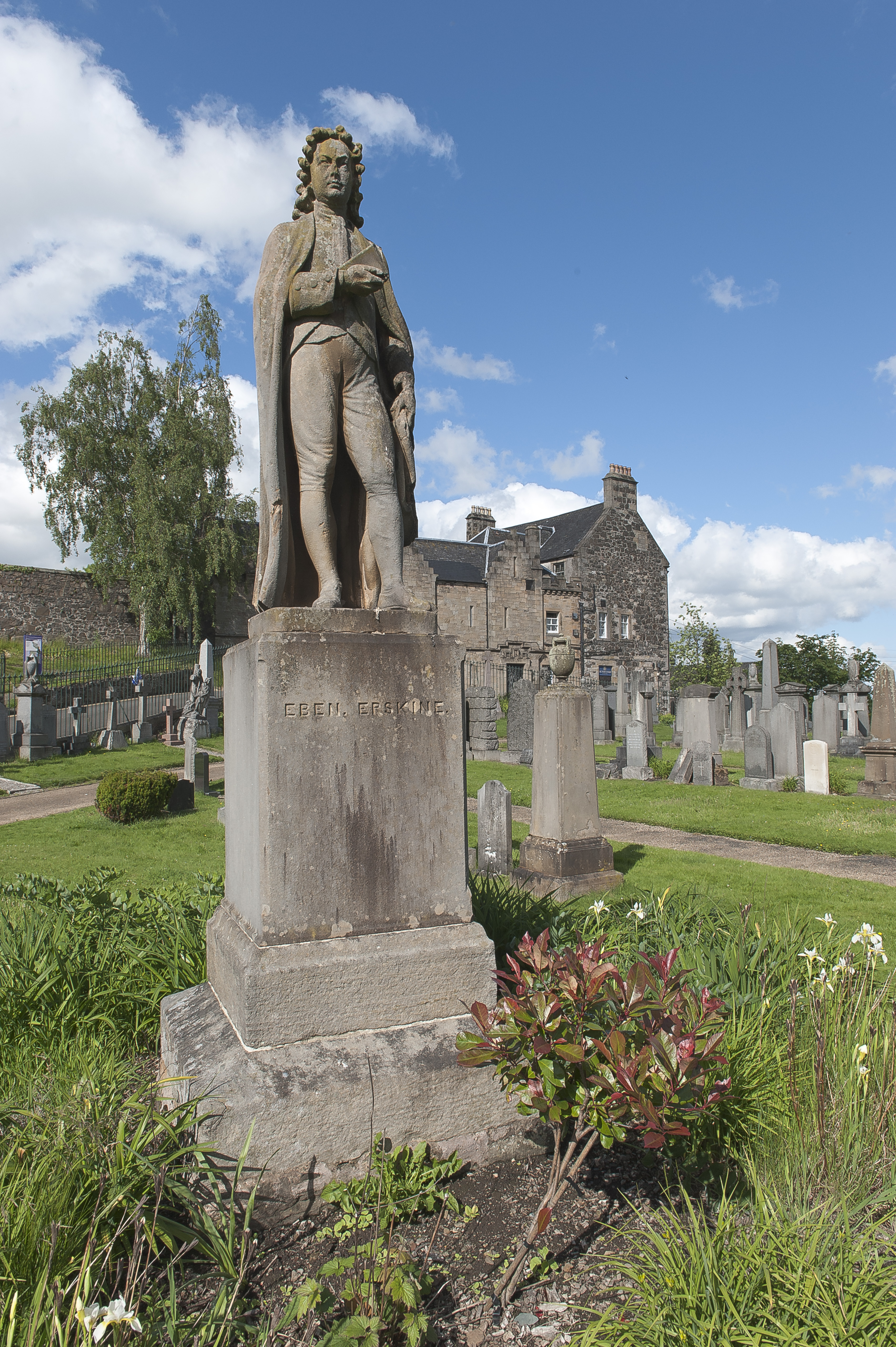
Ebenezer Erskine by Alexander Handyside Ritchie, Valley Cemetery, Stirling.

Ebenezer Erskine (22 June 1680 – 2 June 1754) was a Scottish minister whose actions led to the establishment of the Secession Church (formed by dissenters from the Church of Scotland).

== Early life ==
Ebenezer's father, Henry Erskine, served as minister at Cornhill-on-Tweed, Northumberland, but was ejected in 1662 under the Act of Uniformity and imprisoned for several years. Ebenezer and his brother Ralph were both born during this difficult period in their father's life. After the Glorious Revolution of 1688 Henry was appointed to the parish of Chirnside, Berwickshire.

In 1703, after studying at the University of Edinburgh, Ebenezer was ordained as minister of Portmoak, on the edges of Loch Leven in Kinross-shire. A year later, he married Alison Turpie. They remained in Portmoak for 28 years, until, in the autumn of 1731, he moved to the West Church in Stirling.

== Secession ==
At the General Assembly of 1722, a group of men including Ebenezer had been rebuked and admonished for defending the doctrines contained in the book The Marrow of Modern Divinity. In 1732, a sermon he preached on lay patronage at the Synod of Perth led to new accusations being levelled against him. He was compelled to defend himself from rebuke by appealing to the General Assembly, but the Assembly supported his accusers. After fruitless attempts to obtain a hearing, he, along with William Wilson of Perth, Alexander Moncrieff of Abernethy and James Fisher of Kinclaven, was suspended from the ministry by the Commission of Assembly in November of that year.

In protest against this sentence, the suspended ministers constituted themselves as a separate church court, under the name the "Associate Presbytery". In 1739 they were summoned to appear before the General Assembly, but did not attend because they did not acknowledge its authority. They were deposed by the Church of Scotland the following year.

In the following years a large number of people joined their communion. The Associate Presbytery remained united until 1747, when a division took place over how the church should respond to a new oath required of all burgesses. Erskine joined with the "burgher" section, becoming their professor of theology. He continued to preach to a large and influential congregation in Stirling until his death. He was a very popular preacher and a man of considerable force of character. He was noted for acting on principle with honesty and courage. In 1820 the burgher and anti-burgher sections of the Secession Church were reunited, followed, in 1847 by their union with the relief synod as the United Presbyterian Church of Scotland.

== Influence ==
The majority of Erskine's published works are sermons. His Life and Diary (edited by Donald Fraser) was published in 1831. His Works were published in 1785.

In the United States, part of the Associate Presbyterian Church united with most of the Reformed Presbyterian Church in 1782, forming the Associate Reformed Presbyterian Church. This denomination, which continues today, operates Erskine College and Seminary in Due West, South Carolina.

His teachings are also popular in the Dutch Reformed Church.

== Family ==
His son-in-law Rev Robert Fisher (died 1775), married to his daughter Jean, was a minister in Glasgow.

== Free Gardener ==
Erskine was a Free Gardener. He was Initiated in the Dunfermline Lodge of Free Gardeners in 1722 the same year as his patron, John Leslie, 8th Earl of Rothes.

It is worthy of note that after he became a Free Gardener his sermons began to include numerous horticultural allusions.

== See also ==
- Secession Synod
- Erskine College
- Thomas Mair
