= Alexander Moncrieff (Secession minister) =

Scottish Presbyterian minister (1695–1761)

- Culfargie

Personal details
- Born: 17 July 1695 Scotland
- Died: 7 October 1761 (aged 66) Culfargie
- Buried: Culfargie
- Denomination: (1) Church of Scotland (2) Secession Church (3) Anti-Burgher

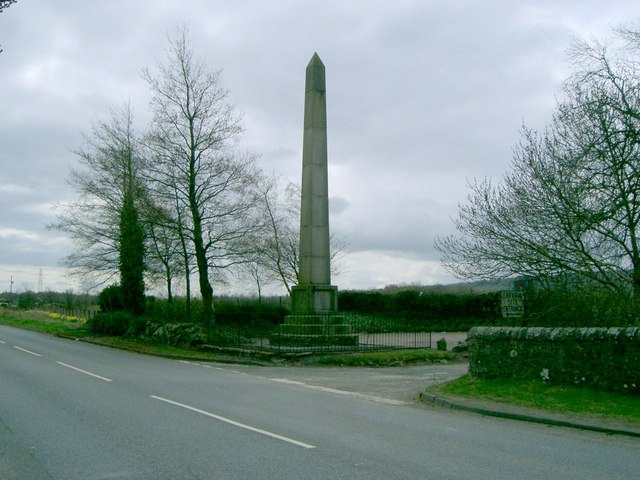
Secession Monument - Gairneybridge

Alexander Moncrieff (1695–1761) was a Scottish Presbyterian minister . He was the son of Matthew Moncrieff of Culfargie and Margaret Mitchell. His paternal grandfather, also Alexander Moncrieff, was a well known minister of Scoonie. He was educated at Perth Grammar School and St Leonard's College, St Andrews. He graduated with an M.A. (5 May 1714) and then attended a course of theology at Leiden under John a Marck and Wesselius. He was licensed by the Presbytery of Perth 29 April 1719 and called 26 April, and by Presbytery jure devoluto, 24 August, and ordained 14 September 1720. He sympathised with Ebenezer Erskine, and the Commission of Assembly on 9 August 1733 suspended him and three associates from the exercise of their ministry. As they refused obedience, on 16 November the Commission declared them no longer ministers of the Church. Moncrieff with his brethren met at Gairney Bridge 6 December 1733, and formed the Associate Presbytery. The General Assembly of 1734 reponed him to office. From 1734 to 1740 he preached from the parish church pulpit, occupied the manse, received the stipend, yet protested against the jurisdiction of the Church, declined to attend Presbytery meetings, or in any way to be amenable to ecclesiastical authority. He was finally deposed by the Assembly on 15 May 1740. He was appointed by the Associate Presbytery Professor of Divinity in February 1742. He joined with those who were against the Burgess Oath, and was one of the founders of the General Associate Synod 10 April 1747. He died on 7 October 1761.

== Life ==
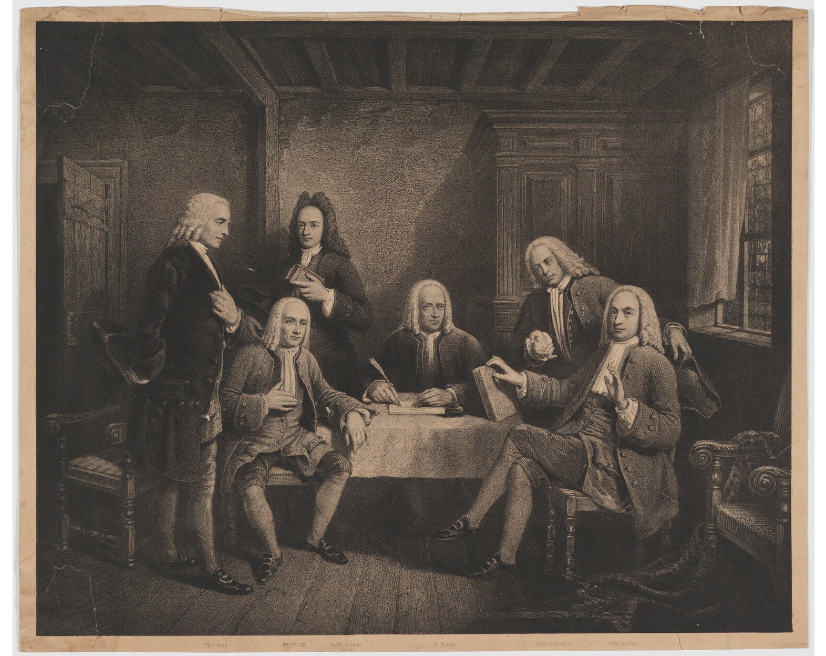
First Secession Churchmen - Moncrieff is second from the right

Alexander Moncrieff, presbyterian minister, born 17 July 1695, was the eldest son of the laird of Culfargie in the parish of Abernethy, Perthshire, and, as his father died when Alexander was a boy became heir to that estate. His grandfather, Alexander Moncrieff of Scoonie, Fifeshire, was the companion of the martyr James Guthrie, whose history and character deeply influenced Moncrieff. After passing through the grammar school at Perth he attended the university of St. Andrews, where he took his degree, and then entered the Divinity Hall of the same university. At the conclusion of his curriculum, in 1716 he went to Leyden, where he pursued his studies for a year. He was licensed by the presbytery of Perth as a preacher in 1718, and in September 1720 he was ordained in his native parish of Abernethy. Keen controversies were agitating the church of Scotland. The Marrow Controversy, in which Thomas Boston of Ettrick was a conspicuous leader, began shortly after Moncrieff's ordination, and he joined the little band who were contending for purity of doctrine in the church. The agitation regarding patronage, or the power of patrons to present to vacant churches, apart from the co-operation or even against the wish of the people, followed. Moncrieff joined the Erskines in denouncing attempts to invade the people's rights. He was one of the four ministers whom the assembly suspended, and who, having formally separated themselves from the judicatories of the Church of Scotland, formed on 6 December 1733, at Gairney Bridge, Kinross-shire, the Secession Church of Scotland. The new denomination met with much sympathy and success, and was soon able not only to supply ordinances in different parts of the country, but even to organise a theological hall for the training of its future ministers. In February 1742 Moncrieff was unanimously chosen professor of divinity, a position which he filled with great ability and zeal. He was also an active and influential member of the associate presbytery and synod. In 1749 his son was ordained as his colleague and successor in the charge of the congregation at Abernethy. Moncrieff published in 1750 a vindication of the secession church, and in 1756 'England's Alarm, which is also directed to Scotland and Ireland, in several Discourses, which contains a warning against the great Wickedness of these lands/ A little devotional work by him, entitled 'A Drop of Honey from the Rock of Christ,' was published posthumously at Glasgow (1778). He died on 7 October 1761, in the sixty-seventh year of his age and the forty-second of his ministry.

He appears to have been a man of resolution and daring. He was jocularly called the lion of the secession church by his colleagues. With Erskine, William Wilson, and James Fisher he was joint author of the 'judicial testimony' against the church of Scotland, issued in December 1736. His church, since its union with the relief church, formed the United Presbyterian Church.

== Family ==
Alexander Moncrieff

He married:

- (1) 10 March 1722, Mary, eldest daughter of Sir John Clerk of Penicuik, Bart., and had issue —
  - Christian, born 1723, died in infancy
  - Margaret, born 1724, died in infancy
  - Matthew of Culfargie, minister of Associate Congregation at Abernethy, born 1725, died 11 June 1767
- (2) 19 September 1728, Jean (died 1791), daughter of William Lyon of Wester Ogle, minister of Airlie, and had issue —
  - William, minister of Associate Congregation at Alloa, and Professor of Divinity in succession to his father, born 1729, died 4 August 1786
  - James, died young
  - George, physician, Perth
  - Ebenezer, born 1731
  - Margaret (married George Murray, minister of Secession Church, Lockerbie)
  - Agnes (married Robert Cunningham of Balgownie, Secession minister at Eastbarns, died 1775)
  - Ann, born 1740 (married Captain James Hutchison, Burntisland)
  - Jean (married Alexander Pringle, D.D., Perth)
  - and seven who died in infancy.

== Publications ==
- The Deity of Jesus Christ proved and asserted from the Holy Scriptures (Edinburgh, 1730)
- The Duty of Contending for the Faith, a sermon (Edinburgh, 1732)
- An Enquiry into the Principle, Rule, and End of Moral Actions (Edinburgh, 1735)
- A Review and Examination of some Principles in Campbell's Discourse, proving that the Apostles were no Enthusiasts (Edinburgh, 1735)
- Christ's Call to the Rising Generation considered, three sermons (Edinburgh, 1740)
- The Duty of National Covenanting explained (Edinburgh, 1747)
- An Examination of the separating Brethren's pretended Right to the Exercise of the Keys of the Kingdom of Heaven (1748) *Animadversions upon Mr Ralph Erskine's Fancy, Still no Faith, etc. (1749)
- England's Alarm (Edinburgh, 1756)
- The Countenancing of Mr Whitefield's Administrations (Glasgow 1758)
- The Artifices of the Burghers (Glasgow, 1761)
- Sermons and Tracts, 2 vols (1779)
- and jointly with Eben. Erskine Act of the Associate Presbytery concerning the Doctrine of Grace (Edinburgh, 1744)
- A Drop of Honey from the Book of Christ (Glasgow, 1778)

== Bibliography ==
- Seton's House of Moncrieff, 101
- The Lyons of Cossins, 67
- Butler's Abernethy, 411-60
- Hist, of the Secession Church Vol.1, Vol.2
- Young's Memorials, with a selection from his works (1849)
- McKerrow's Hist. of the Secession Church, 1848
- Landreth's United Presbyterian Divinity Hall, 1876.

Academic offices
Preceded by William Wilson	Professor of Theology of the Secession Church in Scotland; 1741-1747	Succeeded by Himself as Professor of Theology of the Anti-Burgher Secession Church in Scotland
Preceded by William Wilson	Professor of Theology of the Secession Church in Scotland; 1741-1747	Succeeded by James Fisher as Professor of Theology of the Burgher Secession Church in Scotland
Preceded by Himself as Professor of Theology of the Secession Church in Scotland	Professor of Theology of the Anti-Burgher Secession Church in Scotland; 1747-1761	Succeeded by William Moncrieff
