= Lady with the Ring =

Folklore story

The "Lady with the Ring" is a story about premature burial from European folklore. Versions of the story were popular throughout Europe in the 14th through the 19th centuries. It is a folktale of Aarne-Thompson-Uther Index (ATU) type 990, "Revived from Apparent Death".

== Story ==
=== Central features ===
The central feature of the story is that a woman is buried or entombed while wearing a valuable ring. Shortly after the burial, a grave robber (often a corrupt sexton) disinters the body with the intent of stealing the ring. The robber is unable to slide the ring off the woman's finger, so he prepares to cut off the finger with a knife. However, upon making the initial incision, the woman awakes, surprising the grave robber. The woman had not been dead at all, but had been the victim of premature burial.

=== Variations ===
The following details are included in some versions of the story:

- the grave robber instantly dies of fright after the woman awakes;
- the grave robber runs away, only to fall into the woman's grave and stab himself with his own knife;
- the woman walks a considerable distance from her burial spot to her home;
- the woman's husband or other people at her house think that she is a ghost and refuse her entry into the house;
- the person refusing entry to the woman tells the woman that it would be as impossible for her to return from the dead as it would be for horses to leave their stable and run up the stairs in the house; immediately after making this comparison, horses are heard and seen with their heads emerging from a high window of the house; when this occurs, the person refusing entry realises that the woman is not a ghost;
- the woman lives for many more years and gives birth to numerous children;
- the woman's husband dies of fright upon seeing her.

== Popularity ==
Versions of the story have been found to exist in almost every West European country, including Germany, the Netherlands, France, Scandinavia, Italy, England, Scotland, and Ireland. The story is also told about a former resident of Lunenburg, Nova Scotia, Canada, and on the Eastern Shore of Maryland, United States.

== Specific examples ==
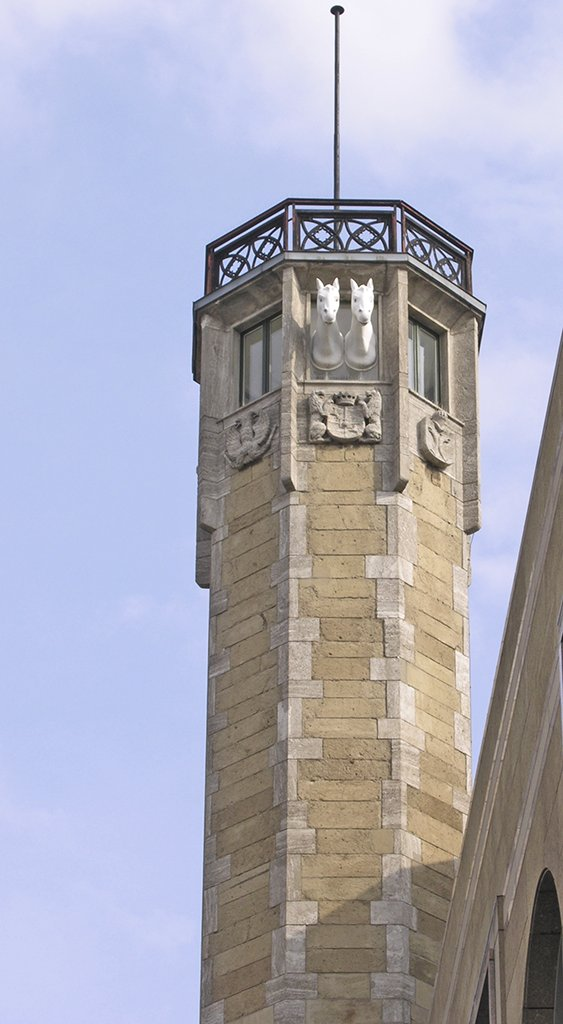
Richmodis tower, Cologne

=== Germany ===
The most famous version of the story is from Cologne, where the woman has been popularly identified as Richmodis von Aducht, the wife of Menginus von Aducht. The incident was said to have occurred during the Black Death in 1357, though other versions claimed that it occurred in the 16th century. In Richmodstraße in Cologne one can find "Richmodis House", birthplace of the composer Max Bruch, where—according to legend—the Aduchts had lived. From a tower two sculpted horseheads look out of a window. These heads by sculptor Wilhelm Müller-Maus were installed in 1958 as a replacement for the wooden ones by Christoph Stephan (1797–1864) that had not survived the bombing of Cologne in World War II.

In 1920, an ethnologist determined that there were nineteen cities in Germany that claimed that a version of the Lady of the Ring had occurred there, including Hamburg, Lübeck, Dresden, and Freiberg. In eleven of the cases, there were horse sculptures that commemorated the strange ending to the story.

=== England ===
In 18th-century England, the woman in the story was identified as Emma Edgcumbe, Countess Mount Edgcumbe, wife of George Edgcumbe, 1st Earl of Mount Edgcumbe. However, the century before, Emma's ancestor Lady Anne Edgcumbe was commonly identified as the woman. In England, numerous other ladies with the ring have been identified, including Annot of Benallay, Lady Katherine Wyndham (wife of Sir Edward Wyndham, 2nd Baronet), Hannah Goodman, and Constance Whitney.

=== Scotland ===
In Scotland, the woman was identified as Marjorie Elphinstone (second wife of Robert Drummond of Carnock), or sometimes Margaret Halcro Erskine.

=== Ireland ===
In Ireland, there is a similar story dated 1695 involving a person called Marjorie McCall who was reportedly living in Church Place, Lurgan and married to a John McCall.

The Public Records Office (PRONI) record the deaths of nine Marjorie McCalls in Lurgan, three of whom were married to a John McCall. However, Shankill Parish have no record of the birth, burial or marriage of a Marjorie McCall to a John McCall in Lurgan. Historian Jim Conway noted many records were lost during the Great Hunger.

A local monumental sculptor by the name of Harkin, from William Street, was permitted to erect the stone in Shankill cemetery in the 19th century as a tourist attraction. It is the only undated stone in the cemetery.

=== United States ===
The rector's wife of Whitemarsh Chapel died and was buried wearing a family ring. Exhumed by grave robbers, she suddenly revived and ran home, where her family nursed her back to health and she lived many years longer. Her grave is marked with a plaque in the church and her ghost occasionally appears in the cemetery.
