= Henry Erskine (minister) =

Scottish Presbyterian minister

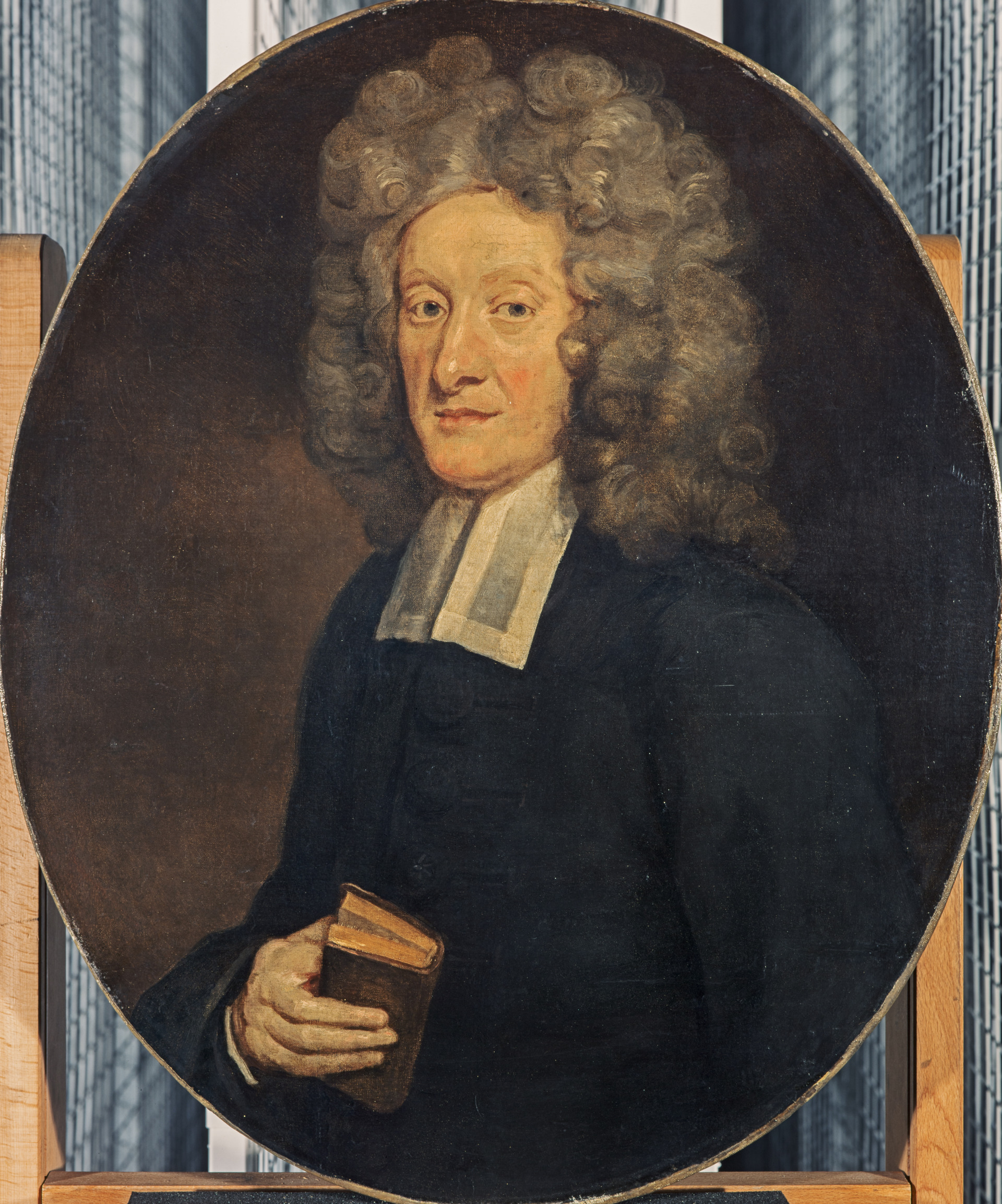

Religious life
- Religion: Christianity
- School: Presbyterianism

Henry Erskine (1624–1696) was a Scottish Presbyterian minister.

== Life ==
Erskine was born at Dryburgh, in the parish of Mertoun, Berwickshire, one of the younger sons of Ralph Erskine of Shielfield, a cadet of the family of the Earl of Mar. Henry was brought up under the ministry of Mr. Simpson, minister of Dryburgh.

Erskine's first charge was at Cornhill-on-Tweed, in Northumberland. According to Robert Wodrow he was ordained in 1649, but according to others this occurred ten years later. From this charge he was ejected by the Act of Uniformity 1662. The revenues of his charge not having been paid to him, he went to London to petition the king; but after a delay he was told that unless he would conform he should have nothing. On his voyage home he was driven by a storm into Harwich, and preached there. But his wife could not be prevailed on to settle in the town.

On leaving Cornhill Erskine went to Dryburgh, where he lived in a house of his brother's. From time to time he exercised his ministry in a quiet way, till arousing the suspicion of Urquhart of Meldrum, one of those soldiers who scoured the country to put down conventicles, he was summoned to appear before a committee of privy council. Being asked by Sir George Mackenzie, Lord Advocate, whether he would engage to preach no more in conventicles, he refused. He was ordered to pay a fine, and to be imprisoned on the Bass Rock till he should pay the fine and promise to preach no more. Being in poor health he petitioned that the sentence might be changed to banishment from the kingdom. This was allowed, and he settled first at Parkridge, near Carlisle, and then at Monilaws, near Cornhill, where his son Ralph was born.

Apprehended again, Erskine was imprisoned at Newcastle, but after his release in 1685 the king's indulgence (1687) enabled him to continue his ministry without molestation. He preached at Whitsome, near Berwick, and after the revolution was admitted minister of Chirnside, where he died in 1696, at the age of 72. It is said that when he could not give his children a dinner he would give them a tune on his zither. Thomas Boston of Ettrick testified to the profound impression made on him in his boyhood by hearing Erskine preach at Whitsome.

== Family ==
Erskine was twice married: first, in 1653, to a lady of whom little is known, and again to Margaret Halcro, a descendant of an old family in Orkney. His two distinguished sons, Ralph and Ebenezer, were children of the second marriage.

== See also ==
- Conventicle Act 1664
- Nonconformism
