= Scoonie =

Coordinates: 56.195°N 2.994167°W

- Location within Fife
- Population: 9,613 (2011 Census)
- OS grid reference: NO384007
- Civil parish: Scoonie
- Council area: Fife
- Lieutenancy area: Fife
- Country: Scotland
- Sovereign state: United Kingdom
- Post town: LEVEN
- Postcode district: KY8
- Dialling code: 01333
- Police: Scotland
- Fire: Scottish
- Ambulance: Scottish
- UK Parliament: Glenrothes and North East Fife
- Scottish Parliament: Mid Fife and Glenrothes

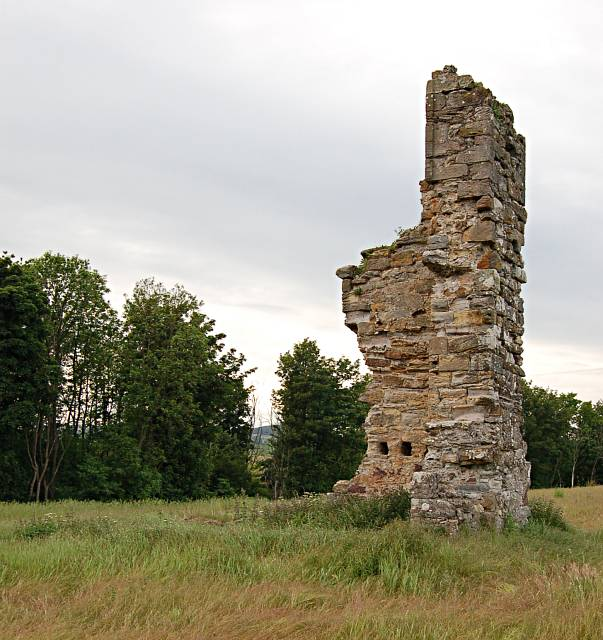
Aithernie Castle in the north of the parish

Scoonie is a settlement and parish in Fife, Scotland, the parish contains the town of Leven. It is bordered on the north by the parishes of Kettle and Ceres, on the east by the parish of Largo, on the south by the parishes of Markinch and Wemyss, and on the west by the parishes of Markinch and Kennoway. It extends about 4 1/2 miles (7.2 kilometres) north to south. Its width varies between 5/8 and 2 3/4 mi (1.0 and 4.4 km). The parish is on the coast of the Firth of Forth, with a coastline of about 1 1/2 mi (2.4 km) The area of the parish is 4,107 acres (1,662 hectares).

Parish of Scoonie, 1900

The River Leven forms the southern boundary of the parish, flowing into Largo Bay. The surface rises gradually northward to 600 feet (180 metres) near Kilmux Wood.

In 1951 the population of the parish was 9,518 and is now 9,613 (in 2011).

The population of the parish is mainly in Leven. In 1791 the parish population was 1,675, of which 1,165 were in the village of Leven. By 1901 Scoonie had a population of 6,342 of which 5,577 were in Leven. At the most recent census (2011) Scoonie has a population of 9,613, of which 9,004 are in Leven (94%).

The old parish church is now a ruin lying in the centre of the burial ground. It was constructed in the twelfth century and all that remains is a roofless structure which may have been the session house or vestry of the church.

The name Scoonie is of Gaelic and possibly Pictish origin meaning place of the lump-like hill. This refers to the site of the old kirk which was on a small hill like a mound.

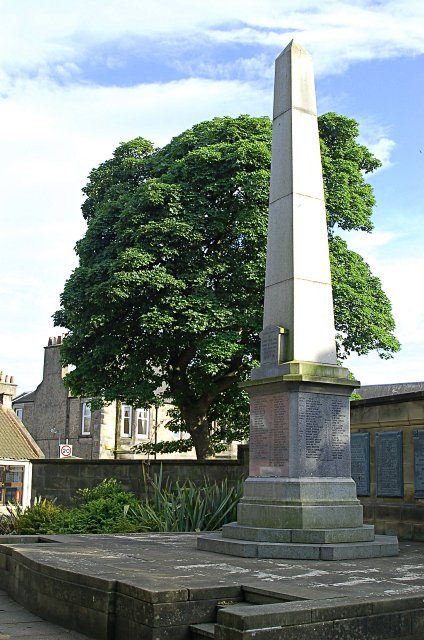
War Memorial of the Parish of Scoonie, Durie St., Leven

Durie House lies in the centre of the parish. This mansion, built in 1762 as the seat of the Durie family, is now a listed building. On the northern borders of the parish are the historic estate of Montrave and the ruined castle of Aithernie, by the banks of Scoonie burn.

== Local Government ==
A Parochial Board was established for Scoonie under the Poor Law (Scotland) Act 1845. The town of Leven became a Police burgh when in 1867 the inhabitants adopted the General and Police Improvement (Scotland) Act, 1862, Andrew Wilkie being elected as the first Chief Magistrate from April 1869.

The "landward" part of the parish, namely the area outside of the burgh of Leven, achieved local self government under the Local Government (Scotland) Act 1894 when Scoonie Parish Council was established, with John Wilkie elected as first Chairman on 20 May 1895. The Parish Council was dissolved when Civil parishes in Scotland ceased to be units of local government after 1930, its functions being transferred to Fife County Council. The civil parish continues as a non-administrative unit for census and other purposes. The ecclesiastic parish is now named Leven

However for the population within the burgh of Leven, their affairs were still governed locally after 1930 by the burgh council, which now had the competencies of a Small burgh. But, by the Local Government (Scotland) Act 1973, the burgh of Leven was abolished in 1975 and, along with the rest of the parish, was subsumed in Kirkcaldy District of Fife Region.

== Notable people ==
- Alexander Moncrieff
