= Kinclaven Bridge =

Bridge in Perth and Kinross, Scotland

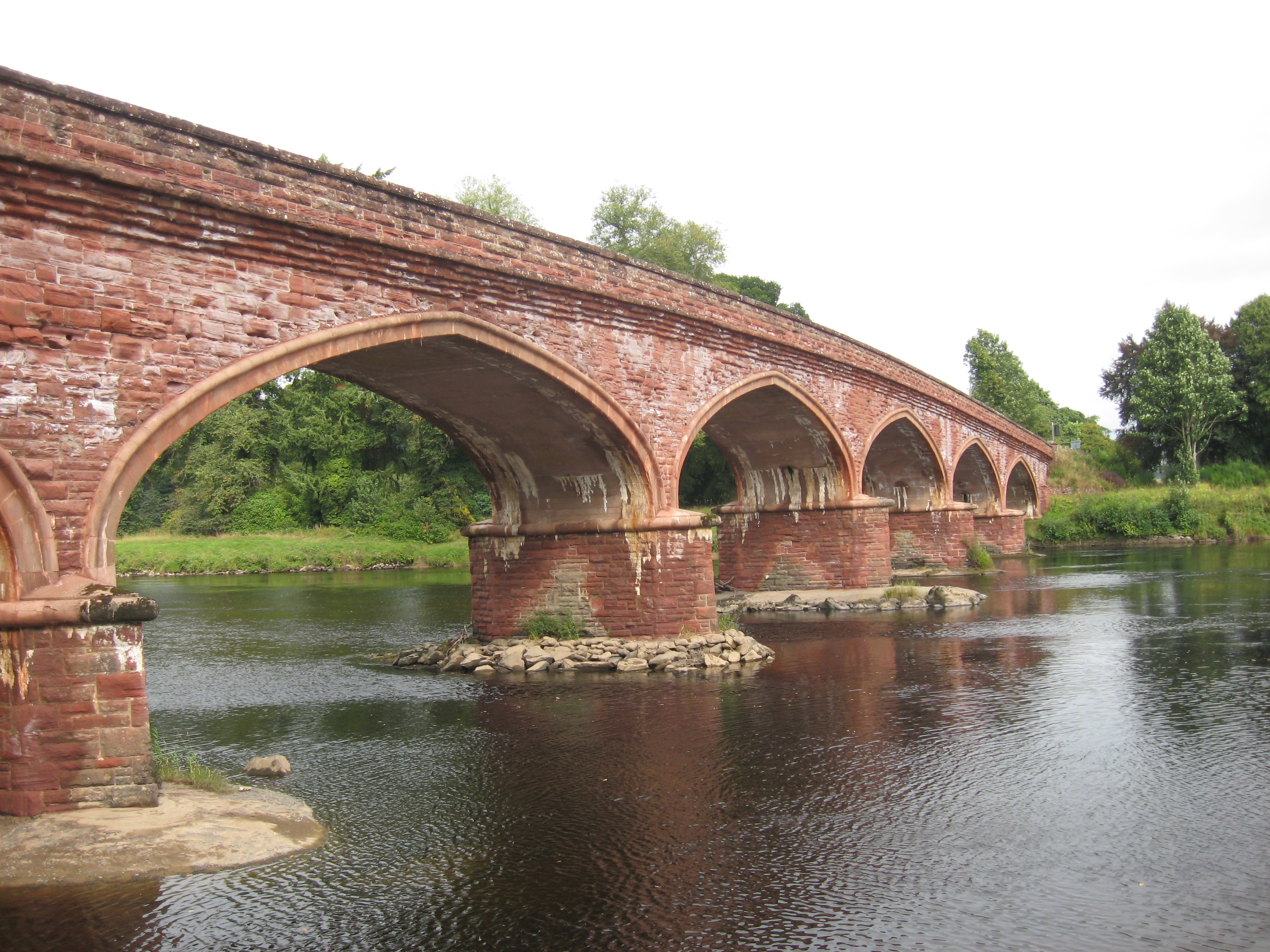
- Bridge in 2021
- Coordinates: 56.52669°N 3.36798°W
- Crosses: River Tay
- Locale: Perth and Kinross

History
- Opened: Early 19th century

Listed Building – Category B
- Official name: Kinclaven Bridge Over River Tay
- Designated: 8 June 1981
- Reference no.: LB11232

Location
- Interactive map of Kinclaven Bridge

Kinclaven Bridge is a bridge in Kinclaven, Caputh parish, Perth and Kinross, Scotland. Completed in 1905, it has been a Category B listed structure since 1981. It has six arches, which are made of concrete; the cutwaters and remainder of the bridge is of ashlar.

== See also ==
- List of bridges in Scotland
