= First Secession =

Exodus of churches from the Church of Scotland in 1733

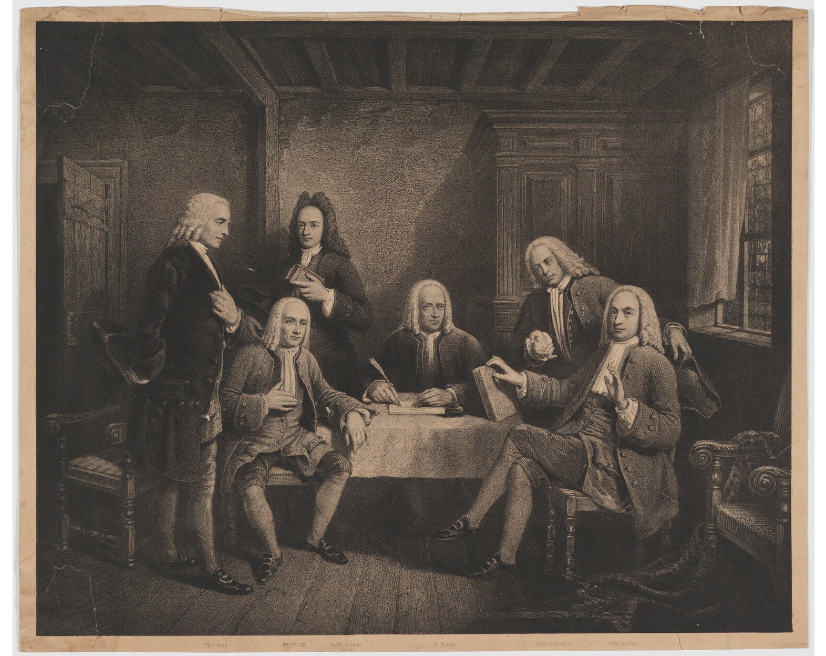
- Classification: Protestant
- Polity: Presbyterian
- Origin: 1733
- Separated from: reconstituted Church of Scotland
- Separations: Burghers vs. Anti-Burghers

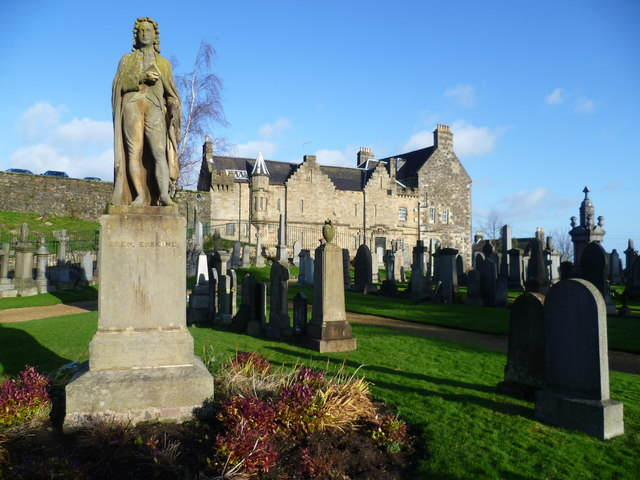
Ebenezer Erskine statue in the Old Town Cemetery, Stirling

The First Secession was an exodus of ministers and members from the Church of Scotland in 1733. Those who took part formed the Associate Presbytery and later the United Secession Church. They were often referred to as Seceders.

The underlying principles of the split focused upon issues of ecclesiology and ecclesiastical polity, especially in the perceived threat lay patronage represented to the right of a congregation to choose its own minister. These issues had their roots in seventeenth century controversies between presbyterian and episcopal factions in the Church of Scotland.

This was complicated by the fact that most ministers, by tradition, were the younger sons from the aristocratic families, and those same families were usually the local landowners. The local landowner therefore would often act as a "patron" to the church, not only through gifting of money, but through supply of their own relatives to fill the role of minister.

There were some ministers from more humble backgrounds, but these frequently found it hard to receive nomination for any post, lacking the family connections then required.

Unlike later schisms, where the country congregations were the main participants, the main advocates of the Secession Church were the town dwellers, and most large Scottish towns had a Secession Church.

== History ==
The Church Patronage (Scotland) Act 1711 laid a bed of general unrest amongst the Church of Scotland, laying down set rules on how ministers were to be chosen and based on very non-Scottish ideas of feudal hierarchy, more a product of the Act of Union 1707 than of traditional Scottish approach to issues.

The First Secession arose out of an act of the General Assembly of 1732, which was passed despite the disapproval of the large majority of individual presbyteries. This restricted to Heritors and Elders the right of nominating ministers to vacancies where the Patron had not nominated within six months. When Ebenezer Erskine wished to have his dissent recorded, it was found that a previous act of the General Assembly of 1730 had removed the right of recorded dissent, and so the protests of the dissenters were refused. In the following October, Ebenezer Erskine, minister at Stirling, and, at the time, Moderator of the Synod of Stirling preached a sermon referring to the act as unscriptural and unconstitutional. Members of the synod objected, and he was censured. On appeal, the censure was affirmed by the Assembly in May 1733, but Erskine refused to recant. He was joined in his protest by William Wilson, Alexander Moncrieff and James Fisher. They were regarded by the Assembly as being in contempt. When they still refused to recant, in November the protesting ministers were suspended. They replied by protesting that they still adhered to the principles of the Church, whilst at the same time seceding.

Timeline showing the evolution of the churches of Scotland from 1560

In December 1733 they constituted themselves into a new presbytery. In 1734 they published their first testimony, with a statement of the grounds of their secession, which made prominent reference to the doctrinal laxity of previous General Assemblies. In 1736 they proceeded to exercise judicial powers as a church court, published a judicial testimony, and began to organize churches in various parts of the country. Having been joined by four other ministers, including the well-known Ralph Erskine, they appointed Wilson Professor of Divinity. For these acts proceedings were again instituted against them in the General Assembly, and they were in 1740 all deposed and ordered to be ejected from their churches. Meanwhile, the membership of their 'Associate Presbytery' increased, until in 1745 there were forty-five congregations, and it was reconstituted into an 'Associate Synod'.

In 1747 the Secession Church split following introduction of the Oath of Burghers, creating the Burghers and Anti-Burghers. In towns where the split occurred the churches were known as the Burgher Church and Anti-Burgher Church. In towns without such a split it continued to be known as simply the Secession Church.

A Second Secession from the Church of Scotland occurred in 1761, with Thomas Gillespie and others. This was called the Presbytery of Relief or more usually simply the Relief Church.

In 1847, this denomination united with the United Secession Church (formed in 1820 from the union of the New Licht Burghers and New Licht Anti-Burghers) to form the United Presbyterian Church.

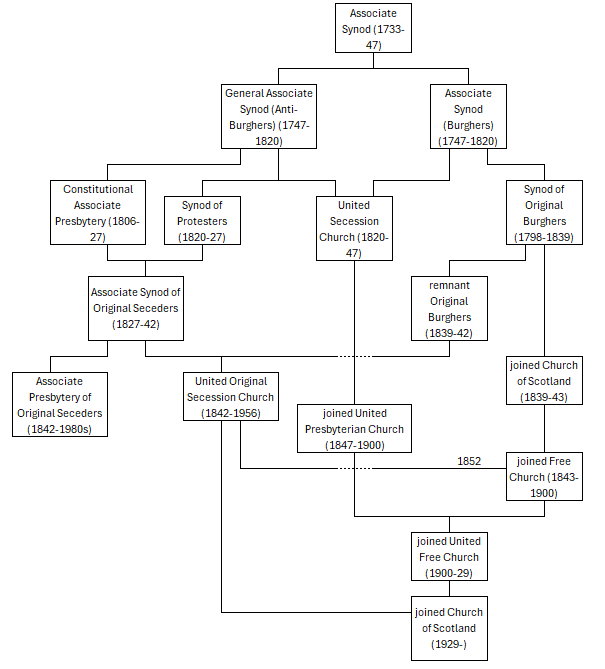
Secession church history

== Churches ==
Affiliations:

- AB = Antiburgher (1747-1820)
- B = Burgher (1747-1820)
- CAB = Constitutional or Auld Licht Anti-Burgher (1806-27)
- CoS = Church of Scotland
- FC = Free Church (1843-)
- ind. = independent
- OB = Original or Auld Licht Burgher (1798-1842)
- OR = 'Old Relief'
- OSC = Original Secession Church (1827-1956)
- S = Secession Church (1733-47)
- SoP = Synod of Protesters (1820-27)
- UFC = United Free Church (1900-29)
- USC = United Secession Church (1820-47)
- UPC = United Presbyterian Church (1847-1900)

Church	From	To	Lifetime	Affiliations	Ministers	Notes
Aberdeen (Nether Kirkgate Burgher)	1757	1801	44 yrs	B	(1) Alexander Dick, 1757-93 (2) William Brunton, 1795-1801.	Originated in a secession from East Parish Church. Dissolved 1801, the majority of the church having left to join the Original Burghers (see below).
Aberdeen (Belmont Street Anti-Burgher)	1777	1921	144 yrs	AB, SoP 1820, USC 1827, UPC 1847, UFC 1900	(1) Michael Arthur, 1782-86 (2) William McCaul, 1789-98 (3) James Templeton, 1801-40 (4) Robert Sedgewick, 1836-49 (5) John Brown, 1850-63 (6) David Beatt, 1865-1921 (7) John Allison, 1903-21	Disjoined from Craigdam. Joined the Synod of Protesters 1820, but USC (rather than OSC) 1827. United with East Church to form Aberdeen East and Belmont Street UFC 1921.
Aberdeen (Belmont Street Relief)	1779	1953	174 yrs	R, CoS 1791	(1) John Bryce, 1779-1831 (2) William Leith, 1829-32 (3) Alexander Davidson, 1832-36 (4) William Tweedie, 1836-42 (5) James Stewart, 1842-43 (6) Thomas Dewar, 1843-73 (7) James Duncan, 1873-94 (8) George Ross, 1876-78 (9) William Scott, 1878-1907 (10) Guy Peebles, 1907-11 (11) William Gordon, 1912-16 (12) John Anderson, 1917-21 (13) Charles Forster, 1921-52	Originated out of an intruded settlement at Gilcomston Chapel. Joined CoS 1791 as a chapel of ease. Became South Parish Church 1828 and St Nicholas South 1929. United with Kincorth Church to form Aberdeen St Nicholas South Kincorth Parish Church 1953.
Aberdeen (Shiprow)	1780	c1840	c60 yrs	OR, R 1791, Ind 1806	(1) John Brodie, 1780-98 (2) Alexander Bower, 1799-1806 (3) John Paton, c1807-11 (4) David Gellatly, 1811-21 (5) Patrick Ross, 1821-23 (6) Hugh Hart, 1823-c1840	Originated in a secession from Belmont Street Relief. At first 'Old Relief', then joined Relief Church 1791. Left it 1806 and became independent. Closed c1840.
Aberdeen (St Nicholas')	1795	1973	178 yrs	B, USC 1820, UPC 1847, UFC 1900, CoS 1929	(1) Laurence Glass, 1800-13 (2) Henry Angus, 1816-60 (3) James McKerrow, 1859-67 (4) John Rutherford, 1868-75 (5) John Robson, 1876-? (6) James Walton, 1899-1900 (7) Ritchie Key, 1900-23 (8) Stephen Band, 1924-29 (9) James Scott, 1929-40 (10) John Turner, 1941-49 (11) Ludovic Gray, 1949-61 (12) Gerald Macallan (1961-73)	Secession from Nether Kirkgate over a disputed ministerial election. Became St Nicholas Union Grove Parish Church 1929. United with West of St Andrew Church to form Aberdeen Langstane Parish Church 1973.
Aberdeen (Nether Kirkgate Original Burgher)	1800	1962	162 yrs	OB, CoS 1839, FC 1843, UFC 1900, CoS 1929	(1) William Primrose, 1806-66 (2) James Collie, 1867-75 (3) James Masson, 1875-84 (4) David Eaton, 1884-93 (5) William Swanson, 1894-1900 (6) James Muir, 1900-32 (7) William Hamilton, 1933-45 (8) Crichton Robertson, 1946-50 (9) John Deans, 1951-62.	The majority (although not the minister) of Nether Kirkgate church joined the Original Burghers in 1800. They sued and gained (re-)possession of the building in 1801. Became Aberdeen Melville Free Church 1843. United with Carden Place Church to form Aberdeen Melville Carden Place Parish Church 1962.
Aberdeen (St Paul's)	1803	1962	159 yrs	OR, R 1805, UPC 1847, UFC 1900, CoS 1929	(1) John Paton, 1803-05 (2) Samuel McMillan, 1807-41 (3) William Beckett, 1837-40 (4) John Thorburn, 1841-45 (5) Andrew Dickie, 1847-87 (6) David Burns, 1883-87 (7) James Aitken, 1888-92 (8) Donald Fairley, 1893-1901 (9) Thomas Simpson, 1901-10 (10) John Clark, 1910-14 (11) Alexander Bishop, 1915-22 (12) George McGregor, 1923-29 (13) Gilbert Gordon, 1929-36 (14) Charles Maclean, 1936-41 (15) Thomas Crawford, 1942-48 (16) Walter Moffat, 1948-54 (17) Theodore Lamb, 1955-62	Secession from Shiprow Relief. At first 'Old Relief', then joined Relief Church 1805. United with Bon Accord Church to form Aberdeen Bon Accord St Paul's Parish Church 1962.
Aberdeen (Skene Terrace)	1808	1908	100 yrs	CAB, OSC 1827	(1) John Aitken, 1811-57 (2) John McKay, 1857-77 (3) Ebenezer Ritchie, 1878-94 (4) Robert Stuart, 1895-98 (5) Robert McVicar, 1903-07	Formed from members of Belmont Street Anti-Burgher. Dissolved 1908.
Aberdeen (Carden Place)	1821	1962	141 yrs	USC, UPC 1847, UFC 1900, CoS 1929	(1) James Stirling, 1824-71 (2) Archibald Young, 1871-1926 (3) Thomas Rankine, 1906-12 (4) Alexander Pirie, 1913-21 (5) Thomas Anderson, 1921-44 (6) Donald Mackay, 1945-50 (7) Douglas Thomson, 1950-56 (8) Alexander Hutchison, 1957-62	When Belmont Street Anti-Burgher church joined the SoP in 1820, a minority joined the USC instead. United with Melville Church to form Aberdeen Melville Carden Place Parish Church 1962.
Aberdeen (Charlotte Street)	1840	1937	97 yrs	USC, UPC 1847, UFC 1900, CoS 1929	(1) Patrick Robertson, 1841-44 (2) John Ritchie, 1845-66 (3) James Cordiner, 1868 (4) Matthew Galbraith, 1869-1903 (5) James Jackson, 1903-29 (6) John Robertson, 1930-36	Split from Belmont Street USC. Renamed Aberdeen Blackfriars 1932. Dissolved 1937.
Aberdeen (Nelson Street)	1863	1909	46 yrs	UPC, UFC 1900	(1) Thomas Brown, 1864-78 (2) John Dobson, 1878-86 (3) Archibald Campbell, 1889-1909	Originated out of a Free Church mission that fell out with its parent body. United with St Andrew's UFC to form Aberdeen King Street UFC 1909.
Aberdeen (Woodside)	1878	1925	47 yrs	UPC, UFC 1900	(1) William Dunbar, 1879-90 (2) John Ure, 1891-1925	Originated by petition. Became Aberdeen St John's UFC. United with Hilton to form Aberdeen Woodside UFC 1925.
Airdrie (Broomknoll)	1800	2016	216 yrs	OB, CoS 1839, FC 1843, UFC 1900, CoS 1929	(1) Robert Torrance, 1806-34 (2) James Findlay, 1835-44 (3) James McGown, 1846-64 (4) William Reid, 1867-1914 (5) Joseph Gray, 1914-21 (6) James MacLauchlan, 1922-24 (7) David Carmichael, 1925-32 (8) Archibald Bell, 1933-45 (9) John Waddell, 1946-55 (10) James Fraser, 1956-61 (11) Duncan McPhee, 1961-78 (12) William Abernethy, 1979-88 (13) John Young, 1989-99	Secession from Airdrie Wellwynd Church. Linked with Calderbank 1998. United with Flowerhill to form Airdrie Cairnlea Parish Church 2016.
Alloa (Original Burgher)	1801	1909	108 yrs	OB, CoS 1839, FC 1843, UFC 1900	(1) James Smith, 1810-27 (2) John Wright, 1830-93 (3) James Wallace, 1875-78 (4) George Milne, 1879-85 (5) John McAlpine, 1885-1909	Secession from Alloa Burgher Church. Became Alloa East Free Church 1843 and Alloa Melville UFC 1900. Absorbed into Alloa Chalmers UFC 1909.
Alyth (Burgher)	1803	1818	15 yrs	B	None	Originated by petition. Dissolved without ever having been able to call a pastor.
Alyth, Coupar-Angus and Rattray (Original Antiburgher)	1806	1839	33 yrs	CAB, OSC 1827	(1) Cunningham Aitchison, 1833-38	Secession from Alyth Antiburgher Church. Dissolved.
Arbroath (Anti-Burgher)	1782			AB	(1) James Miller, 1789-1806	Disjoined from Dumbarrow church.
Arbroath (Original Anti-Burgher)	1806	1924	118 yrs	CAB, OSC 1827, FC 1852, UFC 1900	(1) Benjamin Laing, 1821-29 (2) John Sandison, 1834-71 (3) Frank Mudie, 1869-86 (4) John Pollock, 1887-96 (5) Alexander Stewart, 1897-1908 (6) John Tweedie, 1908-24	Roughly half the Anti-Burgher church, but not the minister, left to join the CABs in 1806. Majority became Arbroath High Street Free Church 1852. United with East UFC to form Arbroath St Ninian's UFC 1924.
Arbroath (Original Secession)	1852	1960s	c110 yrs	OSC, Ind 1956	(1) Benjamin Kirkwood, 1866-68 (2) Alexander Stirling, 1869-1910 (3) William Reid, 1911-21 (4) John Dickson, 1927-30 (5) Robert Crawford, 1933-39 (6) James Moore, 1948-53	When majority of Arbroath OSC joined the Free Church in 1852, a minority continued in the OSC and retained the building. Continued independently beyond the end of the OSC in 1956. Eventually merged with a congregational church.
Auchinleck	1756	1928	172 yrs	AB, SoP 1820, OSC 1827	(1) Robert Smith, 1763-1809 (2) Robert Crawford, 1811-13 (3) Peter McDerment, 1816-33 (4) George Roger, 1837-70 (5) James Spence, 1870-1928	Roots as a praying society in Wallacetown go back to 1738. Disjoined from Kilmaurs 1756. Remained in the OSC 1852. Dissolved.
Ayr	1770	1944	174 yrs	AB, SoP 1820, OSC 1827	(1) John Clarkson, 1772-80 (2) James Taylor, 1781-93 (3) George Stevenson, 1797-1841 (4) John Robertson, 1843-	Disjoined from Kilmaurs 1770. Remained in OSC 1852. Dissolved.
Balfron	1829	1835	6 yrs	USC		Dissolved.
Balmullo	1787	1859	72 yrs	AB - CAB - OSC - FC		Disjoined from Ceres 1787. CAB 1806. OSC 1827. Majority joined Free Church 1852. Dissolved c. 1859.
Balmullo (OSC)	1852	1878	26 yrs	OSC		When majority of Balmullo OSC joined Free Church 1852, a minority continued in the OSC. Dissolved.
Ballynahinch, Ireland	1830			OB - IPC		Joined Irish Presbyterian Church 1830s. Later 3rd Presbyterian, Ballynahinch.
Ballylintagh/Dromore	1820			OB - OSC - IPC		Joined OSC 1841. Relocated to Dromore 1852. United with Toberdoney and joined Presbyterian Church of Ireland 1955.
Ballylintagh (FC)	1852			OSC - IPC		Minority of Ballylintagh OSC joined Free Church 1852. Ultimately joined IPC.
Banchory (I)	1780	1820	40 yrs	B	None	Disjoined from Lynturk. A regular congregation, but never more than a preaching station.
Banchory (II)	1878	1918	40 yrs	UPC, UFC 1900	(1) Thomas Taylor, 1879-87 (2) Colin Nicol, 1888-92 (3) James Wark, 1892-1918	Originated by petition. Became Banchory-Ternan North UFC. United with South to form Banchory UFC 1918.
Bannockburn	1797	1837	40 yrs	B - OB		Disjoined from Stirling 1797. OB 1800. Dissolved.
Bathgate (Orig. Burgher)	1765	1856	91 yrs	B - OB - CoS - USC - UPC		Disjoined from Torphichen 1765. Majority became OBs 1799. CoS 1839. Left for USC 1841. UPC 1847. Dissolved.
Bathgate (New Licht Bu)	1799	1828	29 yrs	B - USC		When majority of Bathgate Burgher Church became OBs 1799, a minority continued as (New Licht) Burghers. USC 1820. Dissolved.
Birsay	c1800	1957	157 yrs	AB - CAB - OSC - CoS		CAB 1806. OSC 1827. Did not join FC 1852. Birsay Swannayside Parish Church 1956. Absorbed into Birsay PC 1957.
Blairgowrie	1830	1838	8 yrs	OB		Dissolved.
Boardmills, Ireland	1811			OB - IPC		Joined Irish Presbyterian Church 1830s.
Brechin City Road	1765	1914	149 yrs	AB - USC - UPC - UFC		Disjoined from Montrose 1765. USC 1820. UPC 1847. Brechin City Road UFC 1900. U/w Bank Street 1914 to form Brechin St Ninian's UFC.
Brechin Maisondieu	1802	1990	188 yrs	B - USC - UPC - UFC - CoS		Burgher. USC 1820. UPC 1847. Brechin Maisondieu UFC 1900. Parish Church 1929. Absorbed into Brechin Cathedral Parish Church 1990.
Brechin South Port	1820	1854	32 yrs	SoP - OSC - FC		When majority of Brechin Antiburgher Church joined USC 1820, a minority joined the SoPs. OSC 1827. Brechin South Port FC 1852. Dissolved 1854.
Burntshields/Bridge of Weir	1738	2025	287 yrs	SC - B - OB - CoS - FC - UFC - CoS		Burgher 1747. Original Burgher 1798. Relocated to Bridge of Weir 1826. CoS 1839. Bridge of Weir FC 1843. Bridge of Weir Freeland UFC 1900. Parish Church 1929. U/w St Machar's Ranfurly PC to form Bridge of Weir PC 2025.
Burrelton	1821	1980	159 yrs	OB - CoS - FC		CoS 1839. Burrelton FC 1843. UFC 1900. Parish Church 1929. U/w Cargill to form Cargill Burrelton PC 1980.
Craigdam	1752	1958	206 yrs	AB, USC 1820, UPC 1847, UFC 1900, CoS 1929	(1) William Brown, 1752-1801 (2) Patrick Robertson, 1804-41 (3) John Callander, 1842-49 (4) William Turner, 1851-72 (5) Douglas Auchterlonie, 1873-1908 (6) Donald Mackenzie, 1910-13 (7) William Fell, 1914-52 (8) James Macleod, 1943-48 (9) James Rust, 1949-58	Originated by petition, when covered the whole of Buchan and Aberdeen. Absorbed by Tarves Parish Church 1958.
Ecclefechan	1749	1915	164 yrs	B, USC 1820, UPC 1847, UFC 1900	(1) John Johnston, 1761-1812 (2) Andrew Lawson, 1816-24 (3) George Johnston, 1826-31 (4) James Harkness, 1832-39 (5) William Tait, 1840-67 (6) Nathanael McDougal, 1868-72 (7) James Rae, 1873-76 (8) Archibald Smith, 1876-89 (9) Robert Small, 1889-95 (10) Alexander Steele, 1896-1915	Seceded from Lockerbie after the Breach of 1747. Originally reached as far as Moffat and Annan. Became Ecclefechan West UFC. United with East to form Ecclefechan UFC 1915.
Ellon	1791	1905	114 yrs	AB, USC 1820, UPC 1847, UFC 1900	(1) James Ronaldson, 1795-1825 (2) William Stobbs, 1827-29 (3) James Young, 1830-42 (4) James Ireland, 1843-90 (5) James Adam, 1886-1905	Disjoined from Craigdam and Clola. Located at Auchmacoy until 1827. Became Ellon North UFC. United with South to form Ellon UFC 1905.
Langholm (Burgher)	1781	1925	144 yrs	B, USC 1820, UPC 1847, UFC 1900	(1) John Jardine, 1789-1820 (2) John Dobie, 1821-45 (3) William Ballantyne, 1846-92 (4) George Orr, 1893-1925	Originated by petition. Became Langholm North UFC. United with South to form Langholm Erskine UFC 1925.
Langholm (Relief)	1801	1925	124 yrs	R, UPC 1847, UFC 1900	(1) Thomas Grierson, 1812-15 (2) Patrick Peacock, 1820-21 (3) James Cross, 1835-43 (4) William Watson, 1844-90 (5) John Mann, 1890-1901 (6) Thomas Cairncross, 1902-07 (7) James Macdonald, 1908-25	Originated by petition. Became Langholm South UFC. United with North to form Langholm Erskine UFC 1925.
Lockerbie	1738	1973	235 yrs	S, AB 1747, USC 1820, UPC 1847, UFC 1900, CoS 1929	(1) George Murray, 1744-57 (2) George Murray, 1762-1800 (3) William Patrick, 1802-15 (4) Joseph Taylor, 1816-25 (5) Hugh Douglas, 1828-64 (6) David Thomas, 1865-1906 (7) James Jack, 1906-12 (8) David Whiteford, 1913-24 (9) John Hastie, 1925-39 (10) John Fletcher, 1939-72	Originated by petition from a Corresponding Society. Originally covered the whole of Annandale. Became Lockerbie Trinity UFC. United with Dryfesdale Church to form Lockerbie Dryfesdale and Trinity Parish Church 1973.
Lumsden	1834	1886	52 yrs	USC, UPC 1847	(1) Robert Crease, 1838-41 (2) William Thomson, 1854-63 (3) William Simmers, 1863-68 (4) James Wilson, 1869-72 (5) John Dempster, 1876-80 (6) James Stark, 1881-86	Originated by petition. Absorbed into Auchindoir Free Church, 1886.
Lynturk	1761	1953	192 yrs	B, USC 1820, UPC 1847, UFC 1900, CoS, 1929	(1) Charles Hunter, 1769-75 (2) Andrew Murray, 1780-1816 (3) John Robb, 1819-53 (4) George McArthur, 1856-63 (5) William Aitken, 1864-75 (6) James Duncan, 1876-1917	Originated in separations from Tough and Banchory-Ternan parish churches. Reduced in status 1917, suppressed 1929 and served by missionaries. United with Leochel-Cushnie to form Leochel-Cushnie and Lynturk Parish Church 1953.
Midmar	1802	1910	108 yrs	B, USC 1820, UPC 1847, UFC 1900	(1) James Paterson, 1805-38 (2) Robert Paterson, 1842-47 (3) John Bell, 1849-75 (4) James Dodds, 1876-87 (5) Henry Ferguson, 1888-95 (6) John Sinclair, 1896-1910	Originated by petition. Became Cluny East UFC. United with West to form Cluny UFC 1910.
Midmar (Original Burgher)	1818			OB		Split from Midmar Burgher. Later Midmar Free Church.
Moffat	1793	1960	167 yrs	B, USC 1820, UPC 1847, UFC 1900, CoS 1929	(1) Hector Cameron, 1794-1805 (2) John Monteith, 1809-44 (3) John Riddell, 1845-68 (4) William Hutton, 1869-80 (5) Alexander McEwan, 1880-86 (6) David Forrest, 1887-94 (7) James Todd, 1894-1910 (8) George Troup, 1911-16 (9) Benjamin Mein, 1917-22 (10) Alfred Muirhead, 1923-29 (11) Hugh Elder, 1930-38 (12) Crichton Robertson, 1938-41 (13) Douglas Watt, 1942-45 (14) Donald Macdonald, 1946-58	Originated by petition. Became Moffat Well Road UFC. United with St Andrew's Church to form Moffat Parish Church 1960.
Old Meldrum	1824	1905	81 yrs	USC, UPC 1847, UFC 1900	(1) James McCrie, 1827-73 (2) Robert Hall, 1862-77 (3) William Lawrie, 1878-79 (4) John McLuckie, 1880 (5) Charles Connor, 1880-92 (6) John Moore, 1894-1905	Originated by petition. Became Old Meldrum Albert Road UFC. United with North to form Old Meldrum UFC 1905.
Shiels	1782	1905	123 yrs	AB, USC 1820, UPC 1847, UFC 1900	(1) James Andrew, 1786-1800 (2) David Waddell, 1800-26 (3) James McIntosh, 1828-50 (4) William Gillespie, 1852-55 (5) Edward Rankine, 1857-92 (6) Joseph Whyte, 1894-1905	Disjoined from Craigdam. United with Belhelvie to form Belhelvie and Shiels UFC 1905.
Stonehaven	1802	1927	125 yrs	B, USC 1820, UPC 1847, UFC 1900	(1) John Ballantyne, 1806-30 (2) David Todd, 1831-55 (3) Thomas Scott, 1857-94 (4) Peter Crowley, 1886-1927	Originated by petition. Became Stonehaven North UFC. United with South to form Stonehaven UFC 1927.
Wamphray	1776	1900	124 yrs	R, UPC 1847	(1) Thomas Marshall, 1777-81 (2) George Nicholson, 1782-92 (3) Decision Laing, 1797-1804 (4) Henry Paterson, 1805-47 (5) John Brash, 1851-54 (6) David Mann, 1855-71	Originated by petition. Originally covered most of Annandale. Reduced to a preaching station, worked by students and retired ministers, 1871. Wound up 1900.
Waterbeck	1790	C21st		R, UPC 1847, UFC 1900, CoS 1929	(1) James Geddes, 1794-1802 (2) John McFarlane, 1803-10 (3) David Struthers, 1811-29 (4) James Watson, 1830-39 (5) Robert Hamilton, 1840-51 (6) David Goodburn, 1852-74 (7) Armstrong Black, 1875-76 (8) James Scott, 1877-87 (9) Adam Welch, 1887-92 (10) Thomas Rankine, 1894-1900 (11) Archibald Alexander, 1900-07 (12) Hugh Watt, 1907-12 (13) Alister Stewart, 1913-19 (14) Allan Craig, 1920-25 (15) David Smith, 1925-30 (16) John Hutton, 1930-38 (17) Alexander Rogerson, 1938-51 (18) Alexander McGillivray, 1951-58 (19) Hugh Macfarlane, 1959-72 (20) Charles Vincent, 1972-81 (21) Eric Burkinshaw, 1983-86 (22) Leslie Thorne, 1987-92 (23) Freda Marshall, 1993-97 (24) Trevor Williams, 1999-	Originated by petition. Linked with Eaglesfield 1941-48, Middlebie 1959- and Kirtle-Eaglesfield 1972-.

== Theological professors ==
- William Wilson (1736–1741)
- Alexander Moncrieff (1741–1747)

== See also ==
- Marrow Controversy
- Secession Synod
- Thomas Mair
- Thomas Nairn

== Bibliography ==
- Acts of the General Assembly of the Church of Scotland 1730, 1732, 1734. Church Law Society, Edinburgh, 1843, British History Online
- Knight, Charles. The English Cyclopaedia: a New Dictionary of Universal Knowledge, Volume VIII, pp. 487-494. Bradbury and Evans, London, 1861.
- Fraser, Donald. The Life and Diary of the Reverend Ebenezer Erskine, A.M.: of Stirling, Father of the Secession Church, to which is prefixed a memoir of his father, the Rev. Henry Erskine, of Chirnside. W Oliphant, Edinburgh, 1831.
- VanDoodewaard, William. The Marrow Controversy and Seceder Tradition. Reformation Heritage Books, Grand Rapids, 2011.
