= Rhynd =

Coordinates: 56°21′53″N 3°21′58″W

Rhynd: Scottish Gaelic: Rinn Dealgros
- Location within Perth and Kinross
- Area: 4.52 sq mi (11.7 km^{2})
- OS grid reference: NO157200
- Council area: Perth and Kinross
- Lieutenancy area: Perth and Kinross
- Country: Scotland
- Sovereign state: United Kingdom
- Post town: PERTH
- Postcode district: PH2
- Dialling code: 01738
- Police: Scotland
- Fire: Scottish
- Ambulance: Scottish
- Scottish Parliament: North Tayside; North East Scotland

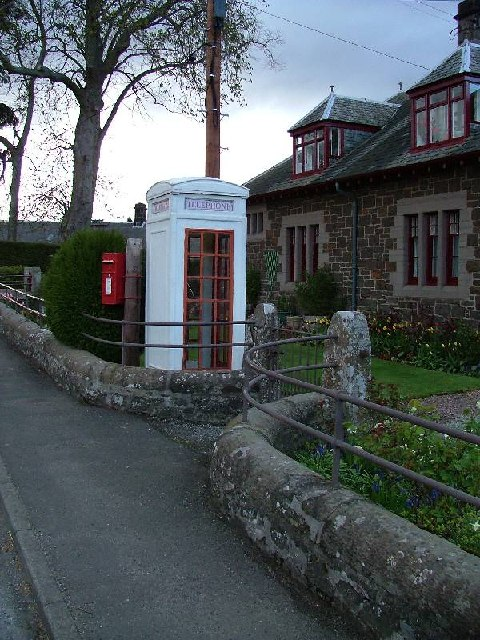
The "K3" telephone box at Rhynd

Rhynd is a hamlet in Perth and Kinross, Scotland. It is located 3 1/4 miles (5.2 kilometres) southeast of Perth, on the south side of the River Tay.

The parish church was built in 1842, and replaced an earlier church at Easter Rhynd, 2 miles (3 kilometres) southeast, where the churchyard can still be seen. The village has an unusual "K3" telephone box, a concrete variant of the more common "K2", which is protected as a category A listed building as the only surviving example in Scotland. The 16th-century Elcho Castle, built by the Wemyss family, lies 3/4 mile (1.2 kilometres) north, and is now in the care of Historic Environment Scotland.

The name Rhynd comes from the Gaelic roinn meaning a share or a portion (of land). The parish consists of 2,893 acres (1,171 hectares) of land.
