= Ralph Erskine (minister) =

Scottish churchman (1685–1752)

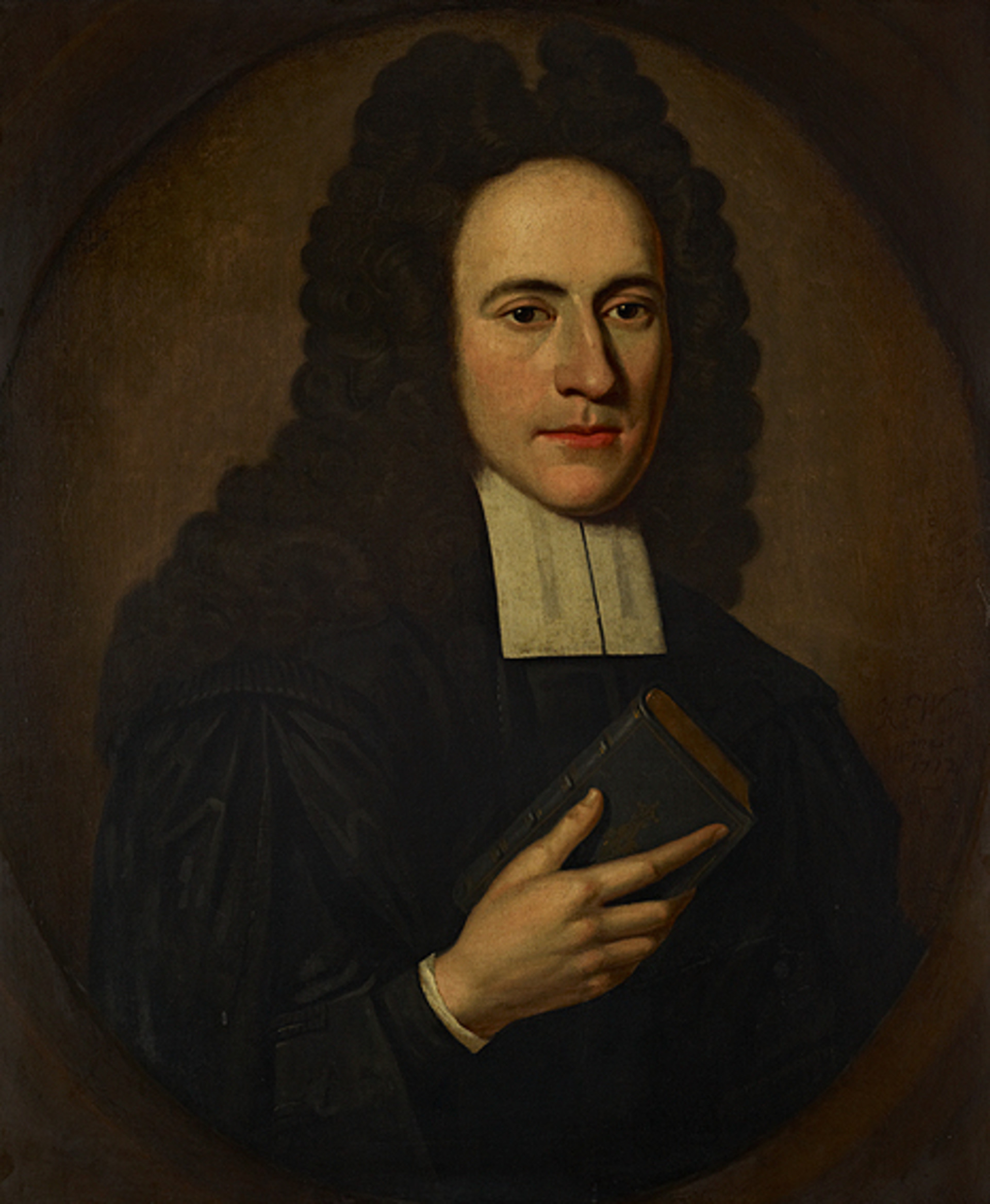
- Portrait of Ralph Erskine by Richard Waitt

Personal details
- Born: 18 March 1685
- Died: 6 November 1752 (aged 67)
- Buried: Dunfermline
- Denomination: (1) Church of Scotland (2) Secession Church (3) Burgher Seceder
- Occupation: poet; minister

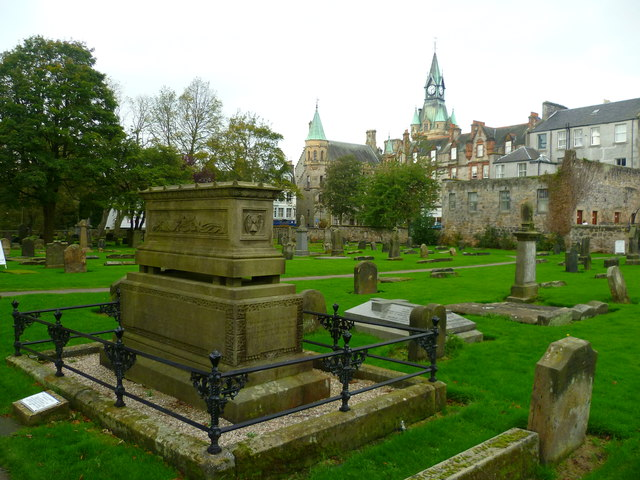
Erskine's grave in Dunfermline

Ralph Erskine (18 March 1685 – 6 November 1752) was a Scottish churchman.

== Family ==
Ralph Erskine was the son of Henry Erskine. He was also the younger brother of another prominent churchman, Ebenezer Erskine.

== Career ==
He was chaplain and tutor to the 'Black' Col. John Erskine from 1705 to 1709. After studying at the University of Edinburgh, Ralph was ordained assistant minister at Dunfermline in 1711. He ratified the protests which his brother laid on the table of the assembly after being rebuked for his synod sermon, but he did not formally withdraw from the establishment till 1737.

He was also present at, though not a member of, the first meeting of the "associate presbytery". When the severance took place over the oath administered to burgesses, he adhered, along with his brother, to the burgher section.

== Literary works ==
His works consist of sermons, poetical paraphrases and gospel sonnets. The Gospel Sonnets have frequently appeared separately. His Life and Diary, edited by the Rev. D Fraser, was published in 1834.

== Memorial statue ==
There is a larger than life size bronze statue of Ralph Erskine on a pedestal, not far from the High Street in the centre of Dunfermline.

== Free Gardeners member ==
He was a Free Gardener being Initiated in the Dunfermline Lodge of Free Gardeners in 1721.

== Quotes ==
- "Faith, without trouble or fighting, is a suspicious faith; for true faith is a fighting, wrestling faith." – Ralph Erskine, 1733
- "A rigid matter was the law,
  demanding brick, denying straw,
  But when with gospel tongue it sings,
  it bids me fly and gives me wings"
  – Ralph Erskine
