= Thomas M'Crie =

Thomas M'Crie was the name of two Scottish Seceder ministers and historians, father and son:

- Thomas M'Crie the Elder (1772–1835)
- Thomas M'Crie the Younger (1797–1875)
