= King Khalid Building =

Church building in City of Edinburgh, Scotland

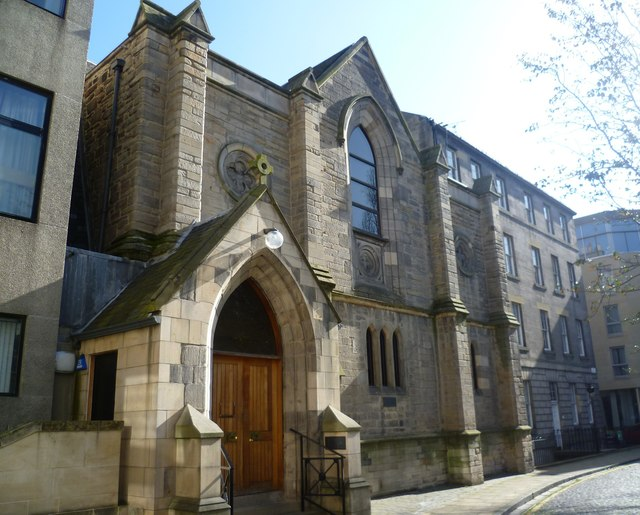
- Interactive map of the King Khalid Building area
- Former names: Roxburgh Free Church (1847–1886); St Michael's Episcopal Church (1888–1965)
- Alternative names: King Khalid bin Abdul Aziz of Saudi Arabia Symposium Hall; Symposium Hall

General information
- Status: In use
- Type: Lecture theatre
- Architectural style: Gothic revival
- Location: Edinburgh, Hill Square; Edinburgh; EH8 9DR, Scotland
- Coordinates: 55°56′48.19″N 3°11′1.68″W
- Named for: Khalid of Saudi Arabia
- Construction started: 1846
- Completed: 1847
- Renovated: 1888; 1982
- Owner: Royal College of Surgeons of Edinburgh

Technical details
- Floor count: 2

Design and construction
- Architect: Thomas Hamilton

Renovating team
- Architects: John Kinross (1888); James Parr & Partners (1982)

The King Khalid Building is an event space in the Southside, Edinburgh, Scotland, owned and operated by the Royal College of Surgeons of Edinburgh. The building was constructed as Roxburgh Free Church in 1847 and converted to its current use in 1982.

The building's first occupants, Roxburgh Free Church, began as a Relief congregation in 1803, subsequently joining the Church of Scotland in 1833 then the Free Church at the Disruption of 1843. The congregation united with McCrie Free in 1886. Between 1888 and 1965, the buildings were occupied by St Michael's Episcopal Church. After a period of dereliction, the buildings were converted for use as a lecture theatre. In recognition of a major donation from King Khalid of Saudi Arabia, the building was given the full name: King Khalid bin Abdul Aziz of Saudi Arabia Symposium Hall. It also operates as a Fringe venue under the name Symposium Hall.

The building was designed in the Gothic style by Thomas Hamilton and opened in 1847. It was altered by John Kinross ahead of its reopening as an Episcopal Church in 1888. In 1982, James Parr & Partners created the two-storey interior with a lecture theatre above and smaller rooms below. A further renovation in 2005 increased the seating capacity.

== History ==
=== Roxburgh Free Church ===
Roxburgh began with Edinburgh's Third Relief Church, founded in 1803. Edinburgh's first Relief congregation had been founded at Potterrow in 1766. It soon outgrew its building and, in 1796, a second Relief congregation was formed at Lady Lawson Street near the West Port. When this moved to St James' Place in the New Town, members on the Southside petitioned to form a new congregation, which was created as the Third Relief Church in 1803.

Initially, the congregation rented a chapel in Carrubber's Close in the Old Town. The congregation was soon growing and, encouraged by the Relief Church's synod, and from June 1810 worshipped in a new church at the corner of Drummond Street and Roxburgh Place. In 1829, Roxburgh Place became the first Presbyterian church in Edinburgh to install a pipe organ. The Scotsman expressed surprise that this innovation had taken place in one of the dissenting churches, "which are generally understood to be more austere than the Establishment". The Relief Church synod ordered the church to remove the instrument but the congregation and the minister, James Johnston, refused and withdrew from the denomination. They continued as an independent congregation until 1833 when they successfully petitioned the General Assembly of the Church of Scotland to join their denomination, albeit on the condition that the organ be removed. The organ was moved to St Margaret's Convent and Roxburgh Place joined the established church as a chapel of ease in St Cuthbert's Parish. The congregation was raised to the status of a parish quoad sacra in 1834.

At the Disruption of 1843, Alexander Gregory, minister of Roxburgh, left the Church of Scotland along with many of his congregation. The previous year, the convocation to prepare for the Disruption had met in the church. The congregation left its buildings at Drummond Street in May 1844. They were joined by the Relief congregation from Roxburgh Terrace Church and worshipped jointly at the Lancastrian School on Davie Street. They moved to a new church on Hill Square, which opened on 10 June 1847. Prominent ministers included Alexander Topp, who later became moderator of the General Assembly of the Presbyterian Church in Canada, and Walter Chalmers Smith, who wrote the hymn "Immortal, Invisible, God Only Wise".

At the encouragement of the Free Church's Presbytery of Edinburgh, Roxburgh united with the nearby McCrie Free Church on Davie Street on 10 January 1886. Roxburgh was always relatively small and its membership stood at 289 at the time of its union with McCrie.

==== Ministers ====
The following ministers served Third Relief Church (1803–1810); Roxburgh Place Relief Church (1810–1829); Roxburgh Place Church (1829–1833); Roxburgh Place Chapel of Ease (1833–1834); Roxburgh Place Parish Church (1834–1843); and Roxburgh Free Church (1843–1886):

- 1803–1808 John Reston
- 1808–1833 John Johnston
- 1834–1837 James Charles Fowler
- 1841 James Hamilton
- 1842–1851 Alexander Gregory
- 1852–1858 Alexander Topp
- 1858–1862 Walter Chalmers Smith
- 1863–1872 John Simpson
- 1872–1873 John Gillison
- 1874–1886 George MacAulay

=== St Michael's Episcopal Church ===
The united congregation of McCrie-Roxburgh Free used the McCrie buildings at Davie Street. The Free Church sold Roxburgh's Hill Square buildings to the Scottish Episcopal Church in 1886.

St Michael's Episcopal Church was first gathered by the Mother Superior of the Community of St Andrew of Scotland in 1865. In its first two years, the charge was supported by St John's Episcopal Church. A mission chapel (known as the House of Mercy) opened at High School Yards, Infirmary Street at the southern edge of the Old Town on 26 July 1868.

The congregation obtained a new constitution in 1881 and the charge was renamed St Michael's the following year. In 1888, the charge became an incumbency when the congregation occupied the former Roxburgh buildings. The church was closed in 1965 and the congregation was amalgamated with All Saints Episcopal Church in Lauriston to form St Michael and All Saints.

==== Clergy ====
The following clergy served St Michael's:

- 1867–1868 Alexander Thomson Grant
- 1868–1870 Arthur Brinckman
- 1870–1872 John Ludford Gardner
- 1872–1874 James Cranbrooke
- 1874–1875 J.B. Johnson
- 1875–1876 Archibald John Norman Macdonald
- 1876–1878 Barnard Tyrrell Thompson
- 1878–1879 John Wilson
- 1879–1881 George Rogers
- 1881–1891 Thomas Isaac Ball
- 1892–1904 John Faber Scholfield
- 1904–1919 Philip Alfred Lempriere
- 1919–1931 Walter Roland Jardine Beattie
- 1932–1939 Basil Edward Joblin
- 1939–1947 Clive Robert Beresford
- 1948–1952 Henry Baylis
- 1952–1964 Charles Henry Scott

=== King Khalid Building ===
After the Episcopal congregation vacated the church, the building became derelict. In 1981, it was restored for use as a lecture theatre by the Royal College of Surgeons of Edinburgh with funding from King Khalid of Saudi Arabia. In his honour, it was given the full title: King Khalid bin Abdul Aziz of Saudi Arabia Symposium Hall. Initially, the building was used for the college's lectures. As the college's commercial operations began to grow, the building was again renovated in 2005 to increase the auditorium's capacity.

== Building ==
The building was constructed between 1846 and 1847 to a design of Thomas Hamilton. The Buildings of Scotland guide to Edinburgh describes the style as "Lumpy Gothic". John Kinross altered the building at its conversion to an Episcopal church and a reredos by Hamilton More Nisbett for the Lady Chapel was added in 1902.

The building was redeveloped as a lecture venue by James Parr & Partners in 1982. The redevelopment split the interior over two storeys with a reception area on the ground floor and an auditorium with capacity for 85 above. The architects claimed the auditorium reproduced the atmosphere of Italian anatomy theatres of the Renaissance. Charles McKean called the interior as a "magical vertical space", citing its exposed stone walls and wooden ceiling.

In 2005, the building was refurbished, including the addition of tiered leather seats, which increased the capacity.

== Facilities and use ==
The auditorium seats 158 and possesses has an advanced audio-visual system including voting panels at seats. The reception area below can be used to host externally catered events. The ground floor includes a dance floor and bar. The adjoining Alasdair Duff Room can be opened up to increase the space.

During the Edinburgh Fringe, the building is managed by theSpaceUK as theSpace @ Symposium Hall.
