= Angus Makellar =

Church of Scotland minister

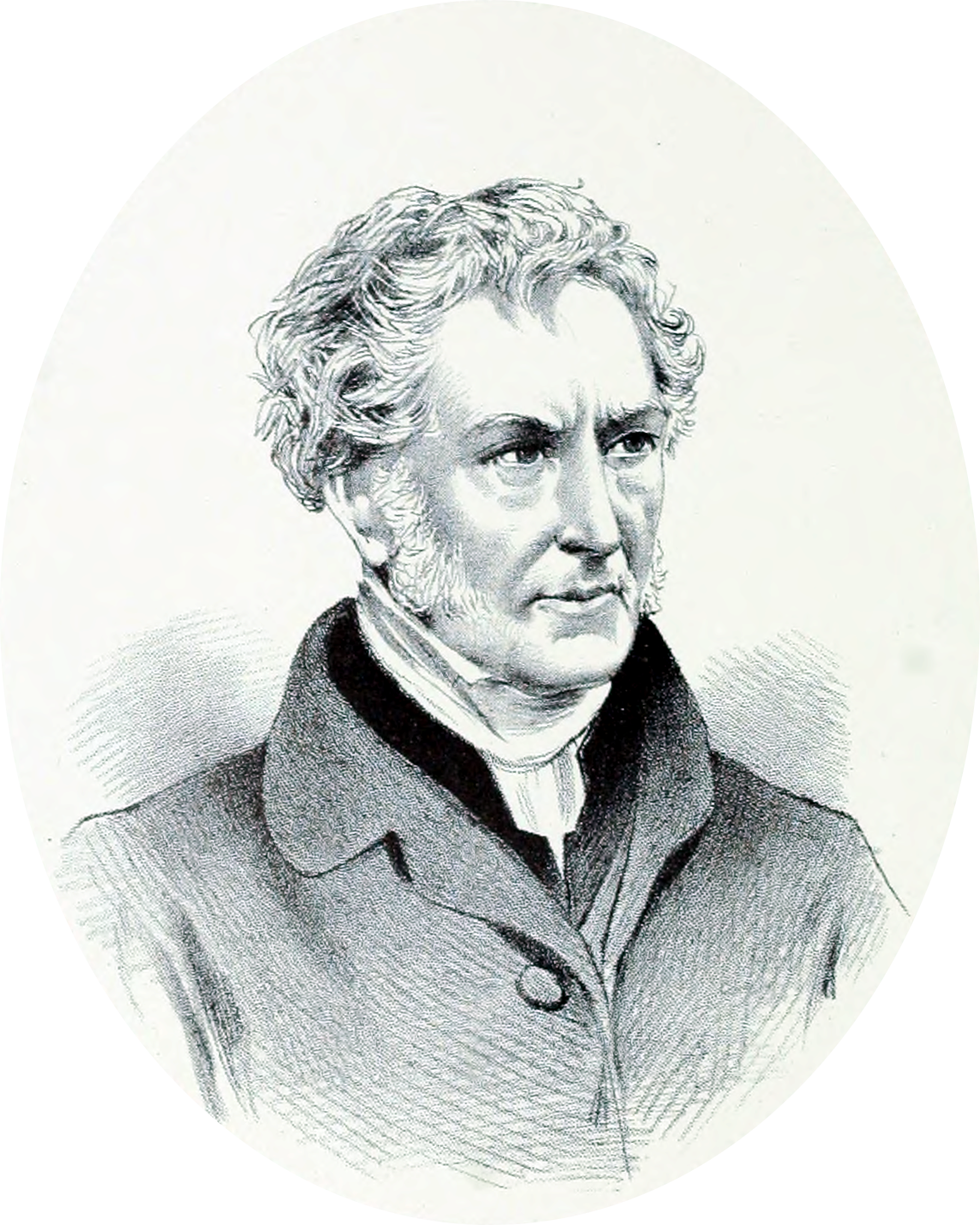
- Angus Makellar from Disruption Worthies
- Church: Pencaitland

Personal details
- Born: 22 June 1780
- Died: 10 May 1859 (aged 78)

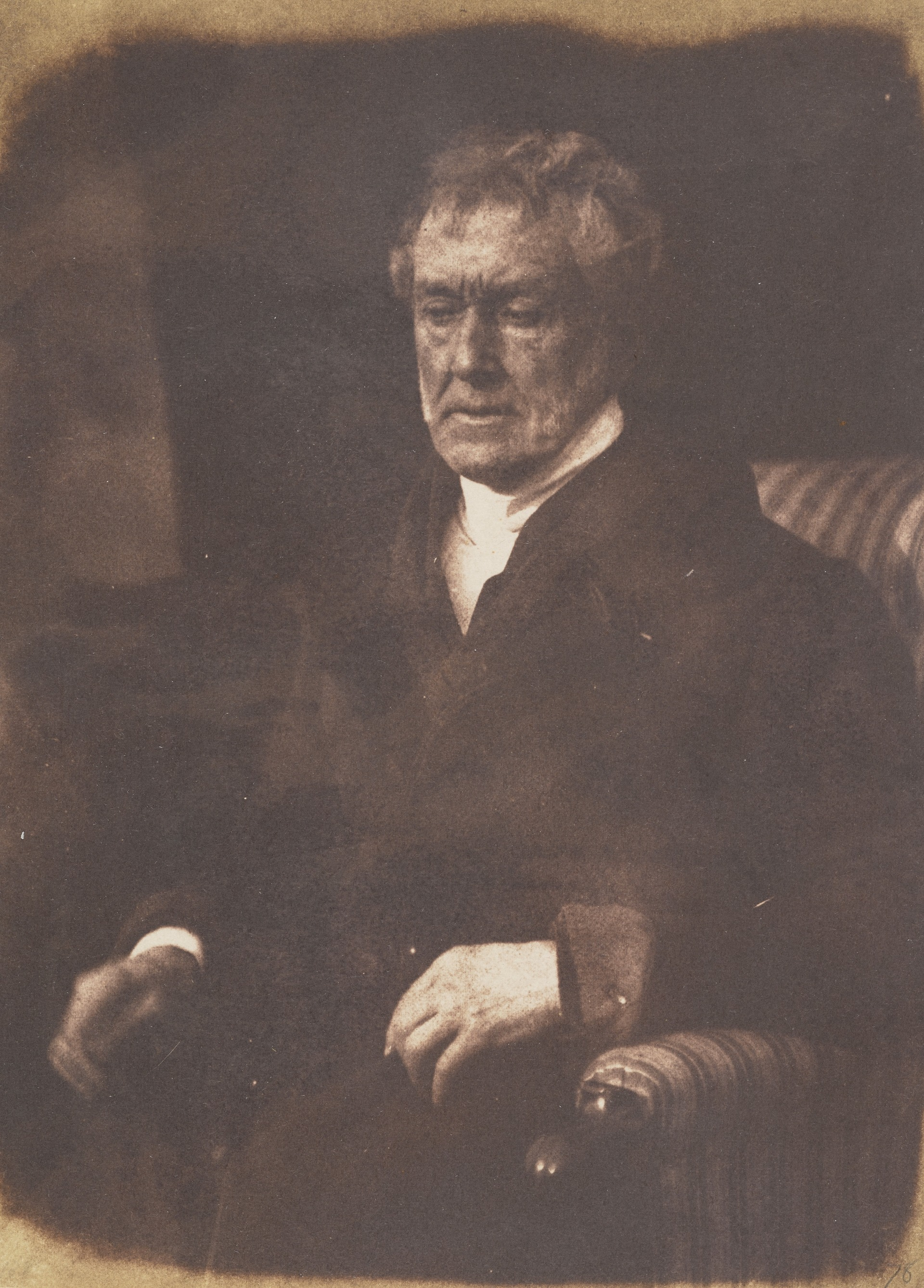
Rev. Dr Angus McKellar by Robert Adamson & David Octavius Hill

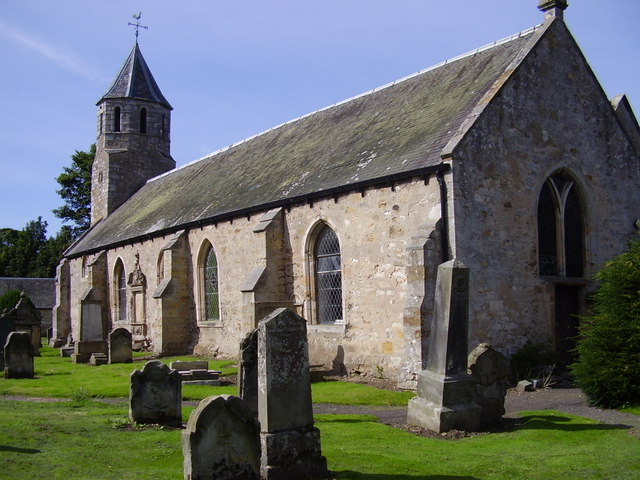
Pencaitland Church

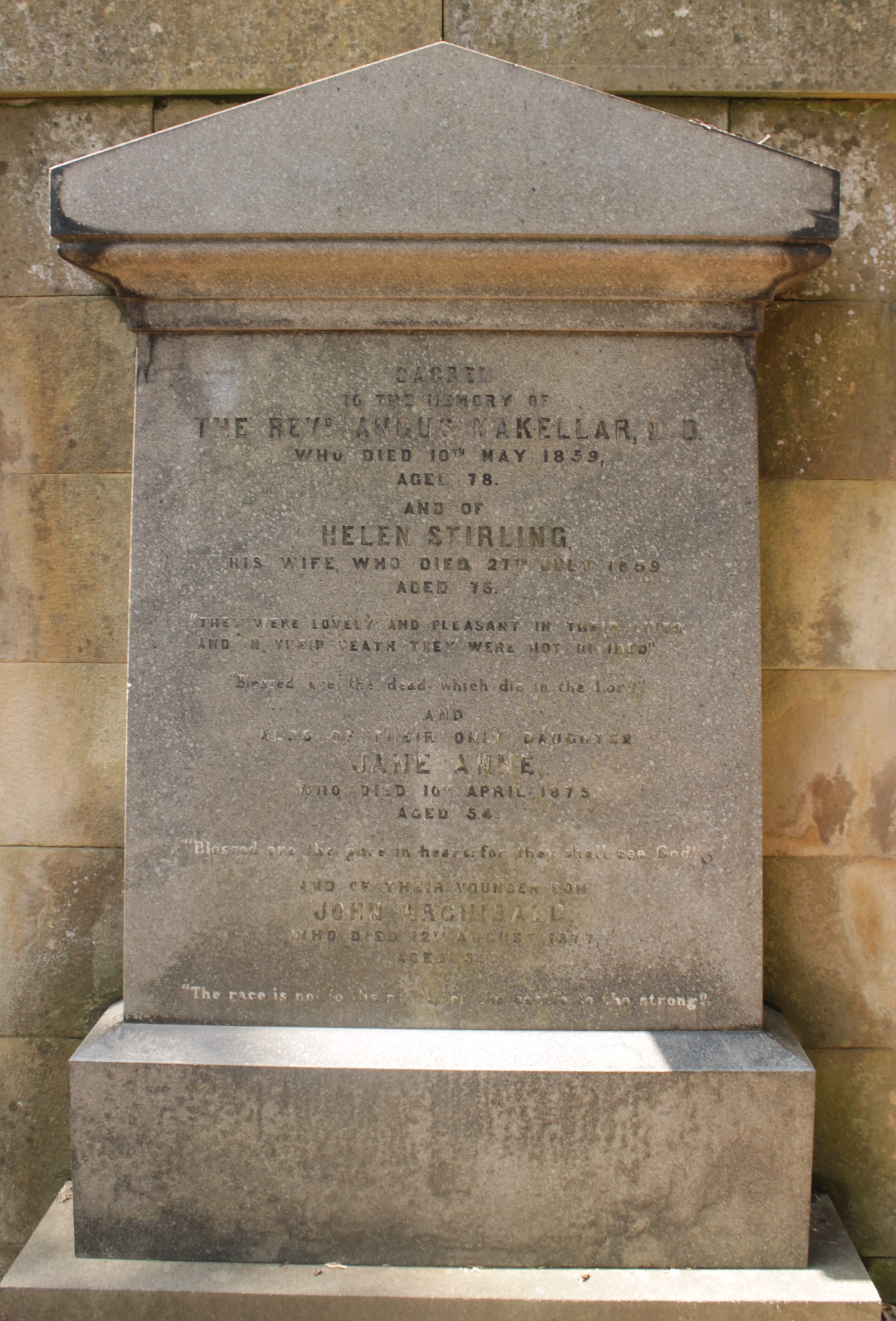
The grave of Rev Angus Makellar, Dean Cemetery

Angus Makellar (1780–1859) was a Scottish minister of the Church of Scotland who served as Moderator of the General Assembly of the Church of Scotland in 1840. Leaving in the Disruption of 1843 he also served as Moderator of the General Assembly of the Free Church of Scotland in 1852.

== Early life and education ==
Makellar was born in Kilmichael on 22 June 1780. He was the son of Duncan Makellar, a farmer in Argyleshire. According to Beith he retained an Argylshire accent throughout his life. He studied divinity at Glasgow University and was licensed to preach in 1810.

== Pre-disruption employment ==
He was ordained as a minister on 30 April 1812 and began as minister of Carmunnock. From 29 June 1814 he was minister of Pencaitland in East Lothian east of Edinburgh. He was succeeded in Carmummock by the Patrick Clason, and after being translated to Pencaitland, in Haddingtonshire, was married to Miss Helen Stirling. He was a awarded a doctorate in divinity from Glasgow University in 1835. Makellar wrote the entry for Pencaitland in the New Statistical Account in May 1839 where he shows, amongst other things, concern for the young women of the parish. He served almost 30 years in Pencaitland until the Disruption of 1843.

== Post-disruption employment ==
He left the Church of Scotland in the Disruption of 1843 and moved to Edinburgh. On leaving his country parish, and coming to reside in Edinburgh, Makellar for some years exercised a sort of general superintendence over the missionary and educational operations of the Free Church, as Convener of the Board of Missions and Education. At the meeting of the Free Church General Assembly at Glasgow, in October 1843, Dr Makellar was unanimously appointed chairman of the Board of Missions. As these duties were "sufficient to occupy his whole time," and rendered it necessary that Dr Makellar should reside in Edinburgh, he was released from his pastoral charge; and his son, the William Makellar, was elected and ordained as his successor.

Soon afterwards Dr Makellar removed to Edinburgh, and devoted his whole heart and energies to the cause of Missions. At such a time, when all the foreign missionaries of the Establishment declared their adherence to the Free Church, and when so many as between 200 and 300 congregations at home were unsupplied with ministers, it was most important that a competent person should be placed at the head of the Mission Board.

From 1844 he was living at 8 Walker Street in the West End. In 1845 he became an Elder of St. George's. In 1852 he shared with Patrick Macfarlan the honour of being called a second time to occupy the Assembly's Chair, this time for the Free Church, having previously occupied that role in the Church of Scotland. Thomas M'Crie was Moderator of the United Original Secession Synod, which united with the Free Church of Scotland on 1 June 1852.

== Plantation owner ==
On the death of his father-in-law (around 1850) he inherited the Hampden and Kerr sugar plantations in Jamaica. The estate was (and is) a major producer of rum. He also inherited his wife's family home at 8 Charlotte Square one of the most prestigious addresses in Edinburgh and the family lived there thereafter. Although listed in some documents as a "slave owner" this is inaccurate as Britain had abolished slavery in its colonies at the time of his inheritance. Makellar did however receive £246 10s 0d (approx £12,000) as compensation for loss of human property paid to slave-holding plantation owners, due to his wife's inherited interest in the Jamaica plantation at Hampden estate and £137 8s 1d as compensation for loss of human property at Kerr estate (approx £16,000). Hampden estate held 246 people enslaved in 1832 and Kerr held 100 people enslaved at that time.

== Death, burial and monuments ==
He died at home in Charlotte Square on 10 May 1859 and is buried with his family in Dean Cemetery in western Edinburgh. The grave lies at the extreme western end of the concealed southern terrace.

== Family ==
In 1814 he was married to Helen Stirling (1783-1859) daughter of William Stirling of Pentcaitland (born at 8 Charlotte Square in Edinburgh). She died about a month after her husband. They had offspring:

- Rev Dr William Makellar (1816-1896), minister of the Free Church, Pencaitland, 1843-5, subsequently a minister and elder of the Church of Scotland, without any charge, born 29 August 1816, died at Biarritz 5 November 1896
- Dr John Archibald Makellar born 26 September 1817 and
- Jane Anne Makellar born 2 September 1820.

== Publications ==
- Three Occasional Sermons (Edinburgh, 1817-38).
