= Thomas M'Crie the Younger =

Scottish church historian (1797–1875)

Thomas M'Crie
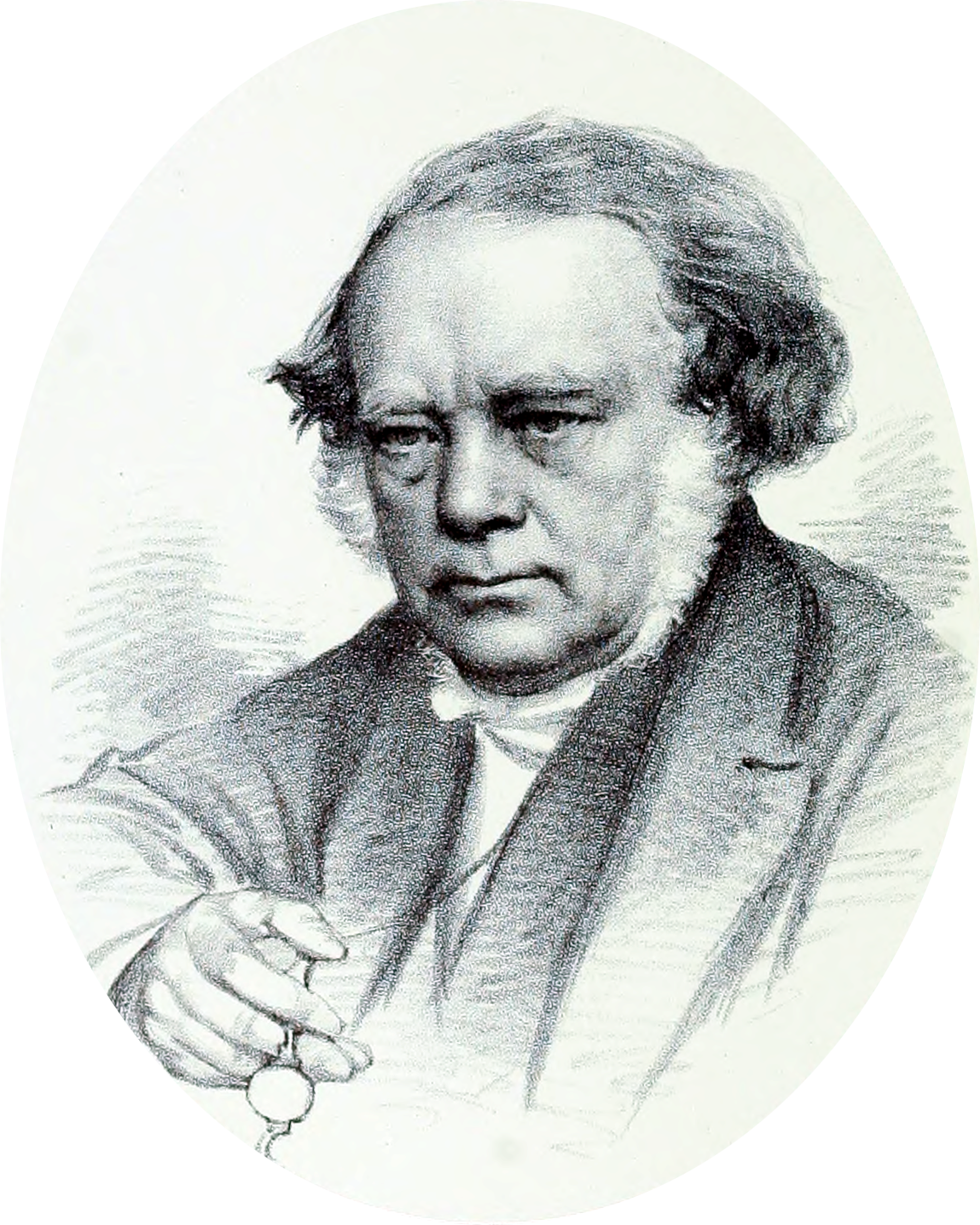
- Thomas M'Crie aged 59 by Tunny
- Born: 7 November 1797; Edinburgh
- Died: 9 May 1875 (aged 77); 39 Minto Street, Edinburgh
- Education: University of Edinburgh
- Occupations: Pastor, Theologian
- Years active: mid 19th-century
- Notable work: The works of Thomas M'Crie, D.D. (The Elder)
- Spouse: Walteria Chalmers
- Children: none
- Theological work
- Tradition or movement: (1) Original Secession Church (2) Free Church of Scotland
- Main interests: Ecclesiology, Church History

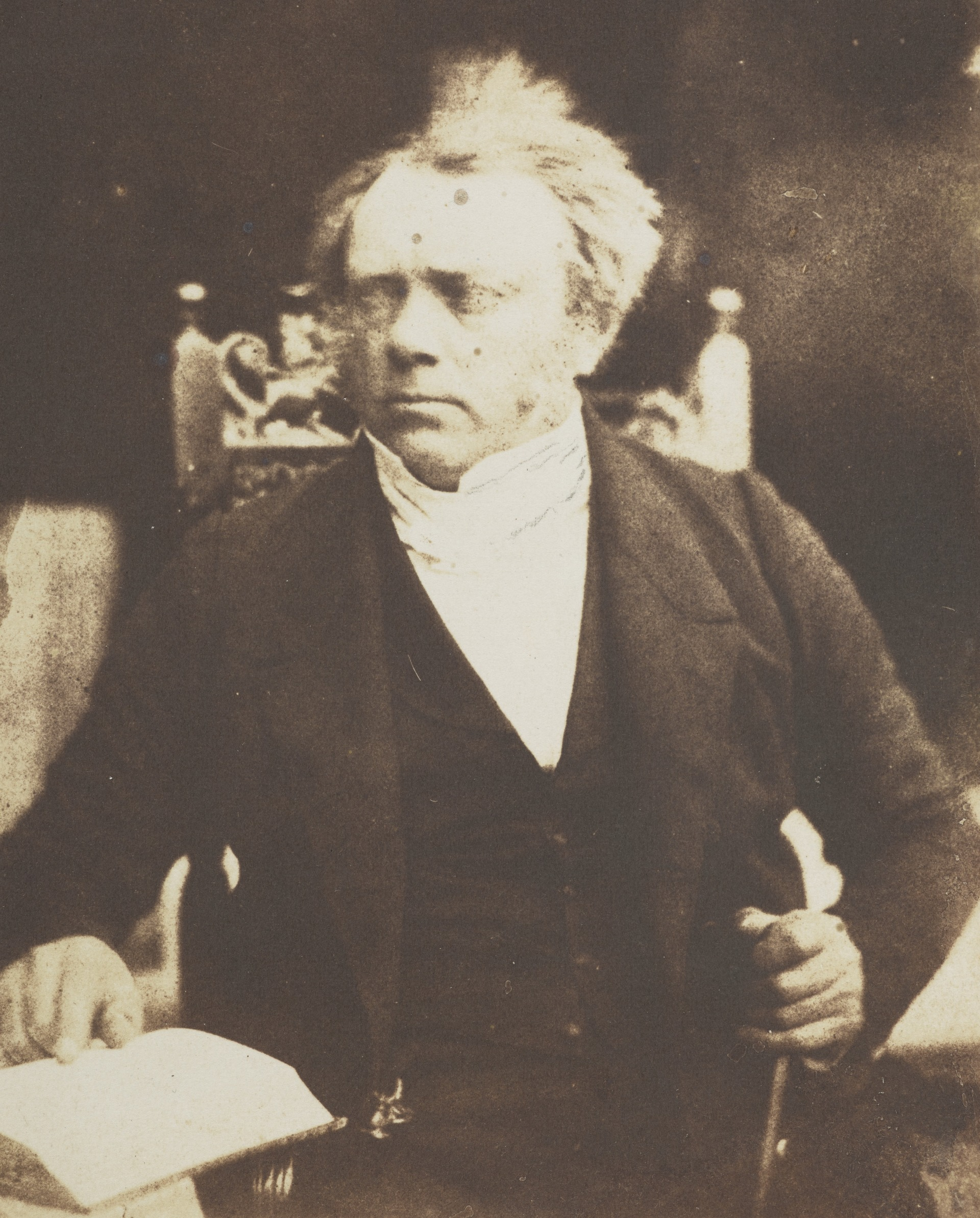
M'Crie by Adamson and Hill

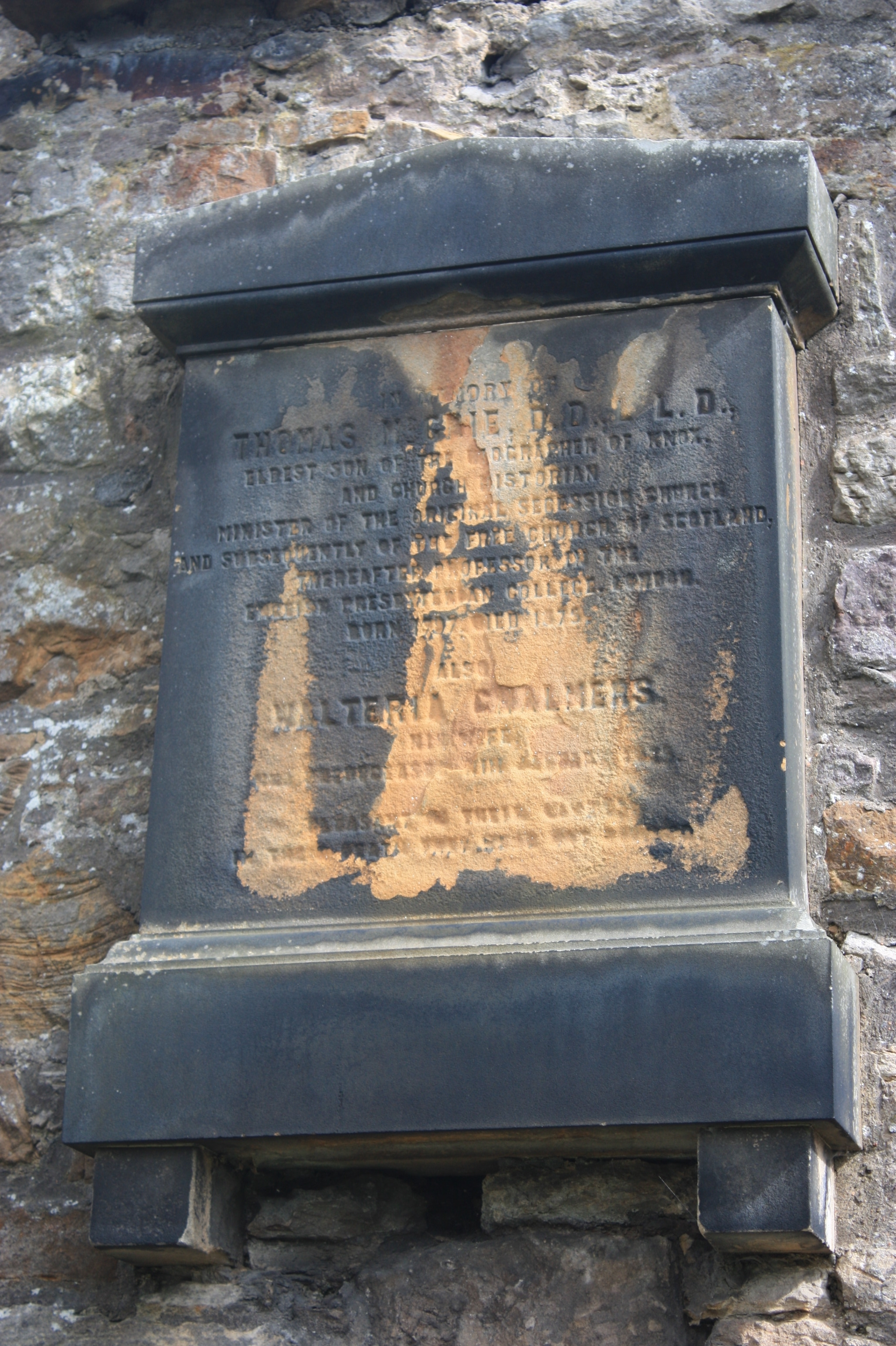
Thomas McCrie the younger's grave, Greyfriars Kirkyard

Thomas M'Crie (earlier spellings include McCree and Maccrie) (7 November 1797–9 May 1875) was a Presbyterian minister and church historian. He was a Scottish Secession minister who joined the Free Church of Scotland and served as the Moderator of the General Assembly to that church 1856/57.

== Early life and ministry ==
He was born at 5 Buccleuch Street in Edinburgh, on 7 November 1797, the eldest son of Thomas McCrie, by his first wife. He was educated at the High School in Edinburgh then studied divinity at the University of Edinburgh. He then transferred to the Theological Hall, run by the Secessionist Church. He received his theological training partly under Professor Bruce, Whitburn, his father, and Robert Chalmers, Haddington (his future father in law). Fellow students included John Duncan, and Robert Shaw who wrote a commentary on the Westminster Confession of Faith.

He was licensed on 15 August 1820. He was called to Crieff on 14 February 1821 being ordained as a minister there but loosed from his charge on 19 July 1826. He moved to Clola in Aberdeenshire and was inducted on 16 April 1829. A couple of years later, in 1831, he was called to Midholm (that is Midlem in Roxburghshire) but declined.

== Subsequent ministry ==
Following this he was translated to Davie Street Church, Edinburgh, as successor to his father, on 9 June 1836 and on 13 May of the same year was appointed Professor of Divinity, as successor to Professor Paxton. M'Crie was Moderator of the United Original Secession Synod, which united with the Free Church of Scotland on 1 June 1852. Angus Makellar was the Free Church Moderator that year.

In the 1850s he was living at 58 George Square. Was chosen Moderator of General Assembly of Free Church in May 1856. In October of same year demitted his charge, and removed to London, to succeed Professor Hugh Campbell in the Theological College of English Presbyterian Church. Owing to ophthalmia he resigned his chair, and returned to Scotland in 1866, and the rank of Emeritus Professor, and a retiring allowance to the close of his life, were voted him by the English Synod. He retired to Gullane in East Lothian due to failing eyesight, but retained an Edinburgh property.

== Death and burial ==
M'Crie died in Edinburgh, 9 May 1875 at 39 Minto Street, and on 14 of same month was buried beside his father in the Greyfriars' Churchyard, Edinburgh. He is buried in the western extension to Greyfriars Kirkyard but has a separate stone, set high on the Flodden Wall facing his father's monument, not far from the spot where the National Covenant was subscribed in 1638.

== Denominational affiliations ==
McCrie's career illustrates the history of various Scottish denominations.

1. He was ordained in 1821 as a minister of the 'Old Light' Anti-Burgher "Constitutional Associate Presbytery".

2. In 1827 the 'Old Light' Anti-Burgher Constitutional Associate Presbytery united with the 'Synod of Protesters' (which had left the 'New Licht' Anti-Burgher Synod in 1820-1) to form the 'Associate Synod of Original Seceders', also known as the Original Secession Church. McCrie was a minister of this denomination throughout its existence.

3. In 1842 the Original Secession Church united with the portion of the Old Light Burghers which had refused to merge with the Church of Scotland, to form the 'United Original Secession Church'.

4. In 1852 some of the members of the United Original Secession Church, including M'Crie, joined the Free Church of Scotland formed by the Disruption of 1843.

5. In 1856 he became a professor in the Theological College of the English Presbyterian Church.

6. He resigned from that post in 1866.

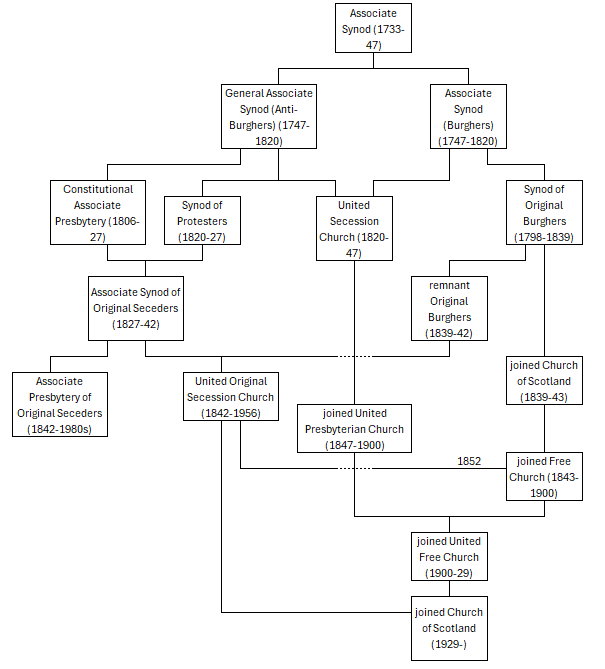
Secession church history

== Family ==
He married Walteria Chalmers, a daughter of Robert Chalmers, the Secession minister at Haddington, East Lothian. They had no children.

== Works ==
Was for several years editor of the British and Foreign Evangelical Review, and author of:

- "Life of Thomas McCrie (1840-1855)
- "Sketches of Scottish Church History," 2 vols, 1841
- "Speech at Bicentenary of Westminster Assembly," 1843
- Translation of "Provincial Letters of Blaise Pascal," 1848, pp. 410
- "Memoirs of Sir Andrew Ague of Lochnaw," Edin., 1850, pp. 442
- "Lectures on Christian Baptism" 1847
- "Memoir of Rev. J. D. Paxton, of Musselburgh," 1805
- "Thoughts on London with the Free Church of Scotland" (1862)
- "Annals of English Presbytery," 1872.
- Edited also a complete edition of the works of Dr James Hamilton, of Regent Square, London, in 1809-73
- "The Ancient History of the Waldensian Church", a Lecture.
- He farther edited "Barrow on the Supremacy," and three volumes of the Wodrow Society Publications, and his last work was his bringing down his Church History Sketches to the Disruption of 1843, under the title of "Story of the Scottish Church from the Reformation to the Disruption" ISBN 0-902506-25-0.

Academic offices
Preceded by George Paxton	Professor of Theology of the Original Secession Church in Scotland; 1836-1852	Succeeded by Matthew Murray as Professor of Theology of the Remanent Original; Secession Church
