= Life church =

- LIFE Church UK, British Christian organisation
- Life.Church, American Evangelical organisation
- Life Church, Edinburgh, a congregation of the Apostolic Church in Edinburgh, Scotland
- Life Church, a.k.a. Life Christian Centre, in Angas Street, Adelaide, South Australia
