= George C. M. Douglas =

Scottish minister

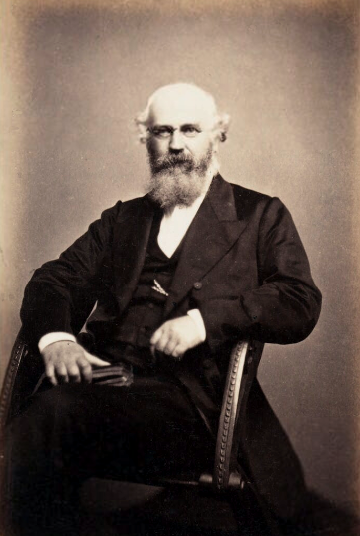
- George C. M. Douglas by Samuel Alexander Walker

Personal details
- Born: 2 March 1826
- Died: 24 May 1904 (aged 78)

George Cunninghame Monteath Douglas (1826–1904) was a Scottish minister of the Free Church of Scotland who was Professor of Hebrew and the Old Testament at Glasgow Free Church College. Douglas was an early member of the Old Testament company for the revision of the authorised version, and served till the completion of the work in 1884. He served as Moderator of the General Assembly to the Free Church in 1894/1895.

== Early life and education ==
Douglas was born on 2 March 1826 in the manse at Kilbarchan in south-west Scotland in 1826 the son of Robert Douglas, the parish minister serving the Church of Scotland, and his wife Janet Monteath, daughter of John Monteath of Houston, Renfrewshire. He was fourth son in the family of five sons and one daughter. The fifth son, Carstairs Douglas, became a missionary, and was a Chinese scholar of repute. George was educated at home by his father with such success that he entered the University of Glasgow in 1837 at the early age of eleven, and took a distinguished place in the classes of languages and philosophy. He graduated B.A. in 1843, the year of the disruption. Throwing in his lot with the Free church, he took the prescribed four years' training in theology at the theological college in Edinburgh, which the Free church had erected with Thomas Chalmers at its head.

== Church ministry ==
He was duly 'licensed to preach' by his presbytery, and, after some years spent in 'assistantships,' was ordained in 1852 minister of Bridge of Weir in Renfrewshire. In 1856 the Free church erected a third theological college, at Glasgow, and Douglas was appointed tutor of the Hebrew classes. The year after (26 May 1857) he became professor, and held this position until his retirement on 23 May 1892. Originally living in college rooms by 1860 he was living at 25 Westminster Terrace, a fine three storey and basement terraced house, with his family. On the death of Patrick Fairbairn, Douglas succeeded him as principal (22 May 1875), and held office till 26 May 1902.

== Wider church work ==
His whole public life was spent in Glasgow in close connection with its university and with its educational and social activities. He took a keen interest in the establishment of the system of national education, which now exists in Scotland, was chairman of the Free church committee on the matter, and was sent to London in 1869 to watch the progress of the education bill through parliament. He was member of the first two Glasgow school boards, and for several years an active member of Hutcheson's educational trust. He was also chairman of the university council's committee on university reform. He received the degree of D.D. in 1867. Douglas was an early member of the Old Testament company for the revision of the authorised version, and served till the completion of the work in 1884; his accurate acquaintance with the Hebrew text rendered him a valuable coadjutor.

In 1894 he succeeded Rev Walter Chalmers Smith as Moderator of the General Assembly.

== Retiral, death and burial ==
He retired in May 1902 and died at Woodcliffe in Bridge of Allan on 24 May 1904 and is buried in the Glasgow Necropolis. He died at Woodcliffe, Bridge-of-Allan, on 24 May 1904, and is buried in the Necropolis, Glasgow.

== Family ==
He was brother to the missionary Carstairs Douglas (1830–1877).

In 1855 he married Grace Alice Moncrieff, daughter of Hugh Moncrieff of Glasgow.

== Character and artistic recognition ==
A full-length portrait by G. Sherwood Calvert at one time was displayed on the walls of the Free Church College at Glasgow. As a Hebraist Dr. Douglas belonged to the older school of scholars. He had an exact and minute acquaintance with the Massoretic text of the Old Testament and with extra-canonic Hebrew literature. He read widely and had at his command the results of Hebrew scholarship, German, French, and English. But he had a profound distrust of what he called ' the hasty generalisations 'of the higher criticism, and was always ready to defend his conservative position.

== Publications ==
- The Law of the Bible as to the Prohibited Degrees of Marriage (1858)
- (tr.) Introduction to the Old Testament by Karl Friedrich Keil (1869–70)
- Why I Still Believe that Moses Wrote Deuteronomy (1878)
- The Book of Judges in Handbooks for Bible Classes (1881)
- The Book of Joshua in Handbooks for Bible Classes (1882)
- A Short Analysis of the Old Testament by Means of Headings to the Chapters (1889)
- The Six Intermediate Minor Prophets (1890)
- The Old Testament and its Critics (1892)
- The Deuteronomical Code (1894)
- Isaiah one and his Book one (1895)
- Samuel and his Age (1901)
- The Story of Job (1905)
