= Life Church, Edinburgh =

Life Church
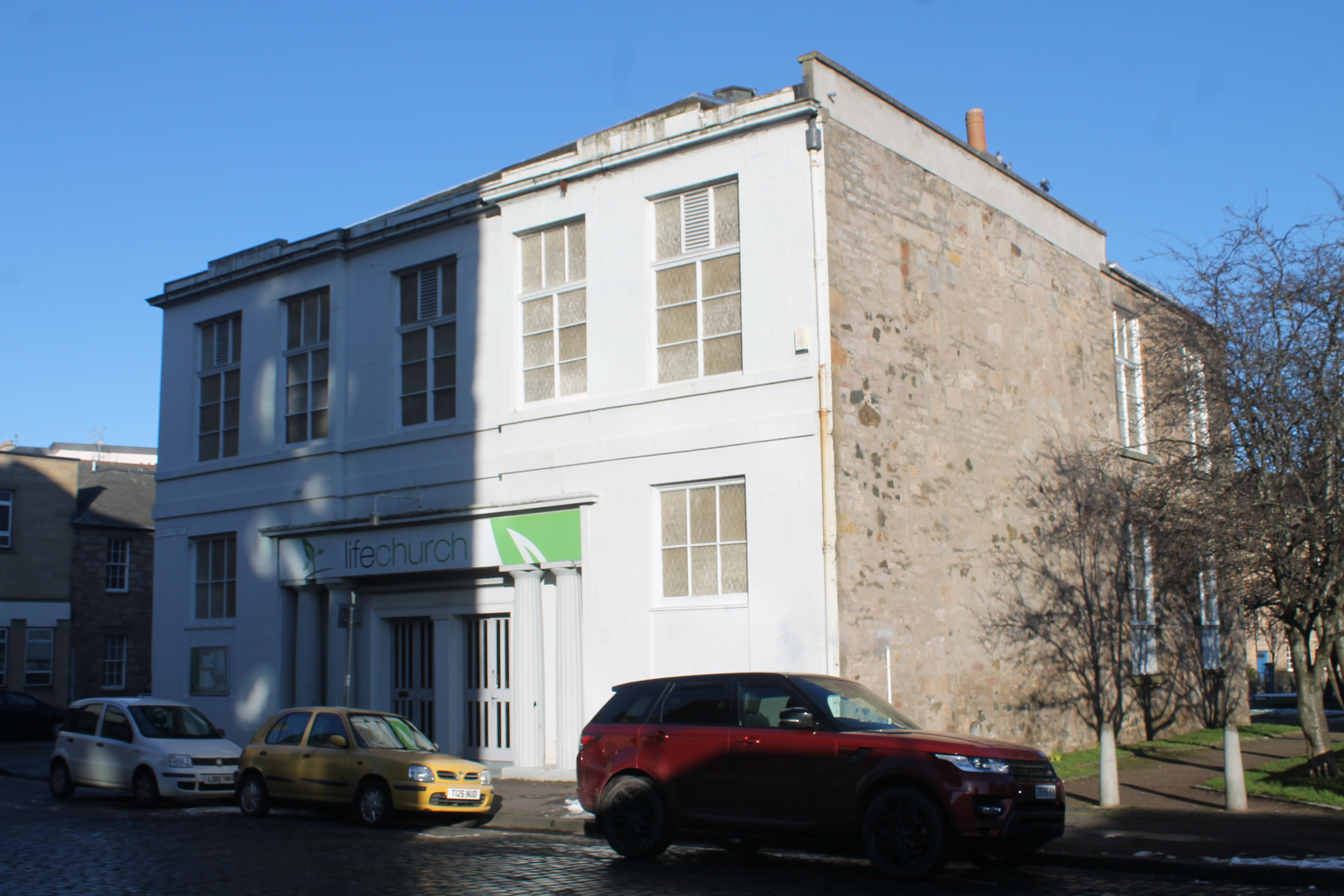
- Life Church
- 55°56′43.86″N 3°10′58.86″W
- Location: Edinburgh
- Country: Scotland
- Denomination: Apostolic Church
- Previous denomination: United Free Church of Scotland (1900–1920); Free Church of Scotland (1852–1900); United Original Secession Church (1842–1852); Auld Licht Anti-Burgher Secession (1806–1842)

History
- Former name(s): McCrie-Roxburgh United Free Church (1900–1920); McCrie-Roxburgh Free Church (1886–1900); McCrie Free Church (1858–1886); Davie Street Free Church (1852–1858); Davie Street United Original Secession Church (1842–1852); Edinburgh Auld Licht Anti-Burgher (Constitutional) Secession Church (1806–1842)
- Status: Active
- Founded: 1930

Architecture
- Functional status: Active
- Style: Neoclassical
- Completed: 1813

Clergy
- Pastor: Jacob Crolla

Listed Building – Category B
- Official name: Apostolic Church Davie St and West Richmond Street
- Designated: 12 December 1977
- Reference no.: LB30009

Life Church is a congregation of the Apostolic Church located in the Southside, Edinburgh, Scotland. The church's building was constructed for a congregation of Auld Licht Anti-Burghers in 1813.

The building's first congregation was founded in 1806, when Thomas M'Crie the Elder, a leading Auld-Licht or conservative withdrew from the Anti-Burgher Secession Church. After M'Crie's death in 1835, the congregation called as its minister Thomas M'Crie the Younger. The Auld Licht Ant-Burghers joined other factions to form the United Original Secession Church at a meeting in the building in 1842. In 1852, the United Original Secession joined the Free Church and six years later adopted the name McCrie Free Church. In 1886, they united with Roxburgh Free Church to form McCrie-Roxburgh Free Church. In 1900, the congregation joined the United Free Church and, in 1920, the congregation united with Newington United Free Church. The united congregation retained the McCrie-Roxburgh buildings as mission halls before selling them to the Apostolic Church in 1930. They remain in use by that denomination.

The church is a simple Neoclassical building of 1813. The interior was recast in 1886 by George Washington Browne and refurbished in 1981. Since 2018, the congregation has been engaged in the planning process to add an extension to the building.

== History ==
=== McCrie Free Church ===
McCrie Church began in 1806, when Thomas M'Crie the Elder, minister of Potterrow Anti-Burgher Secession Church withdrew, along with most of his congregation, from that denomination in opposition the moderate New Lichts who were then in ascendancy. The congregation remained at Potterrow until 1809, after which they met at Carrubber's Close in the Old Town before moving to a purpose-built meeting house on the corner of Davie Street and West Richmond Street in the Southside in May 1813. In 1827, a faction of Auld Licht Anti-Burghers who opposed the creation of the United Secession Church in 1820 joined the Davie Street congregation. In 1842, Auld Licht Anti-Burghers joined other factions to form the United Original Secession Church at a meeting in the Davie Street meeting-house. The church became the meeting place of the United Original Secession synod. At M'Crie's death, the congregation called as minister his son Thomas M'Crie the Younger.

The Original Secession Church united with the Free Church in 1852 and the Davie Street congregation adopted the name McCrie Church in 1858 in honour of their first two ministers. McCrie was reduced to the status of a mission station in 1885. At the encouragement of the Free Church's Presbytery of Edinburgh, McCrie and Roxburgh united on 10 January 1886. The united congregation used the McCrie buildings.

McCrie Roxburgh's minister, John McNeill proved so popular a preacher that congregations had soon outgrown the Davie Street building and, in 1888, the congregation considered constructing a new church. By 1910, however, McCrie-Roxburgh had the smallest membership of any of the five United Free churches in the Southside. After considering and rejecting union with Fountainhall Road in the Grange and Craigmillar Park in Newington, the congregation decided on union with Newington United Free Church on the condition that the Davie Street buildings be retained as mission halls. McCrie-Roxburgh held its last service on 27 June 1920.

==== Ministers ====
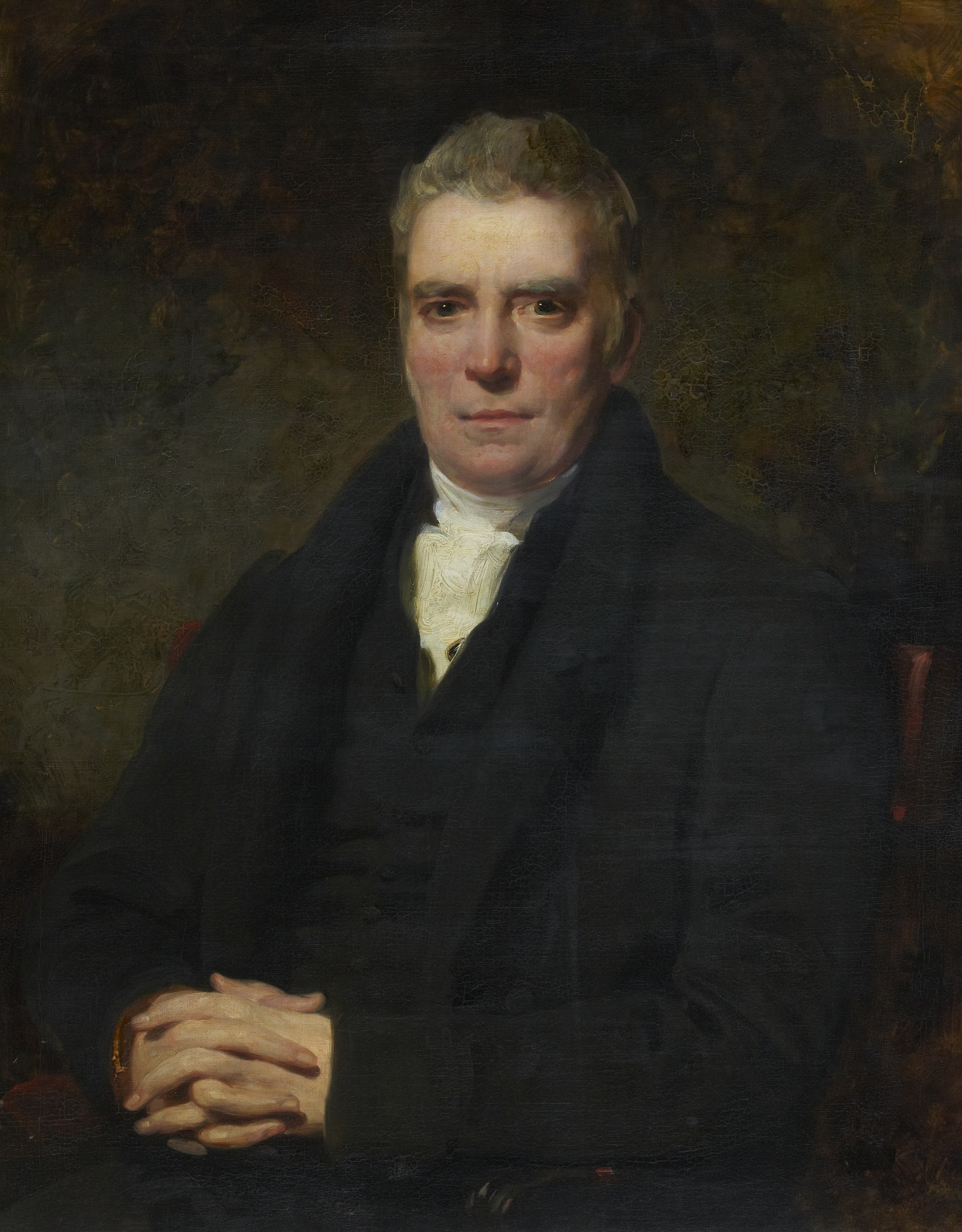
Thomas M'Crie the Elder: founding minister of the congregation and later its namesake

The following ministers served the Edinburgh Auld Licht Anti-Burgher (Constitutional) Secession Church (1806–1842); Davie Street United Original Secession Church (1842–1852); Davie Street Free Church (1852–1858); McCrie Free Church (1858–1886); McCrie-Roxburgh Free Church (1886–1900); and McCrie-Roxburgh United Free Church (1900–1920):

- 1806–1835 Thomas M'Crie the Elder
- 1836–1856 Thomas M'Crie the Younger
- 1857–1890 Robert Philip
- 1880–1885 Neil Patrick Rose
- 1886–1889 John McNeill
- 1889–1891 John Robertson
- 1891–1905 James Stirling
- 1906–1920 James Lawson

=== Life Church ===
After the union of the United Free Church with the Church of Scotland in 1929, Newington became a parish church and the Davie Street buildings lay outwith its territory. They were sold to the Apostolic Church, a Pentecostal denomination, the following year and remain in use by that congregation. Repairs were carried out in 1981.

== Life Church today ==
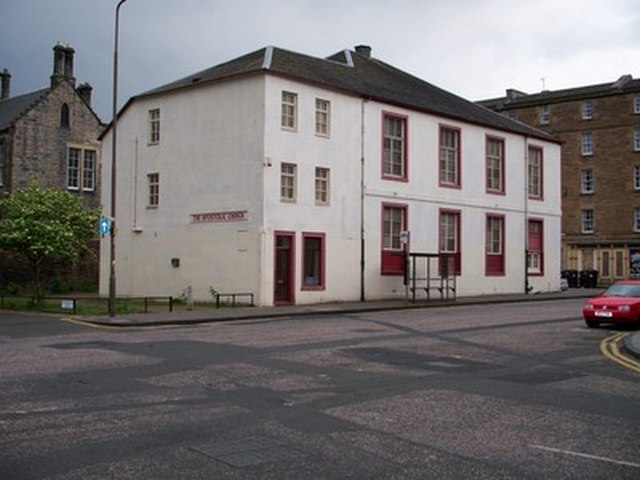
The church seen from West Richmond Street in 2009

Life Church is a member of the Apostolic Church and subscribes to the denomination's statement of faith. Charities supported by the congregation include Soul Food – providing meals and hospitality for those in need – and Bethany Christian Trust: a homelessness charity.

Since 2018, the congregation has been planning to extend the church. Initial plans by architects Aitken Turnbull were withdrawn on the advice of planners in June 2018. These had included the demolition of an unlisted extension. In July 2019, news plans were submitted. These included the retention of the extension as well as the construction of a two-storey rear with an angular concrete colonnade. After the second proposals were rejected, further plans were submitted in March 2021. These include a curved exterior wall with bronze fins dividing the windows.

== Building ==
The building was constructed in 1813. Its exterior is a simple rectangle with a two-storey facade of five bays, which includes double Doric columns in antis flanking the doorway. The columns may have been added around 1830. The central bay of the facade is slightly recessed.

The sanctuary has a gallery on three sides and was recast by George Washington Browne in 1886, including the addition of an ornate ceiling. The ceiling was removed during roof repairs in 1981.

The church has been Category B listed since 1977.
