= Thomas M'Crie the Elder =

18th/19th-century Scottish preacher

Thomas McCrie
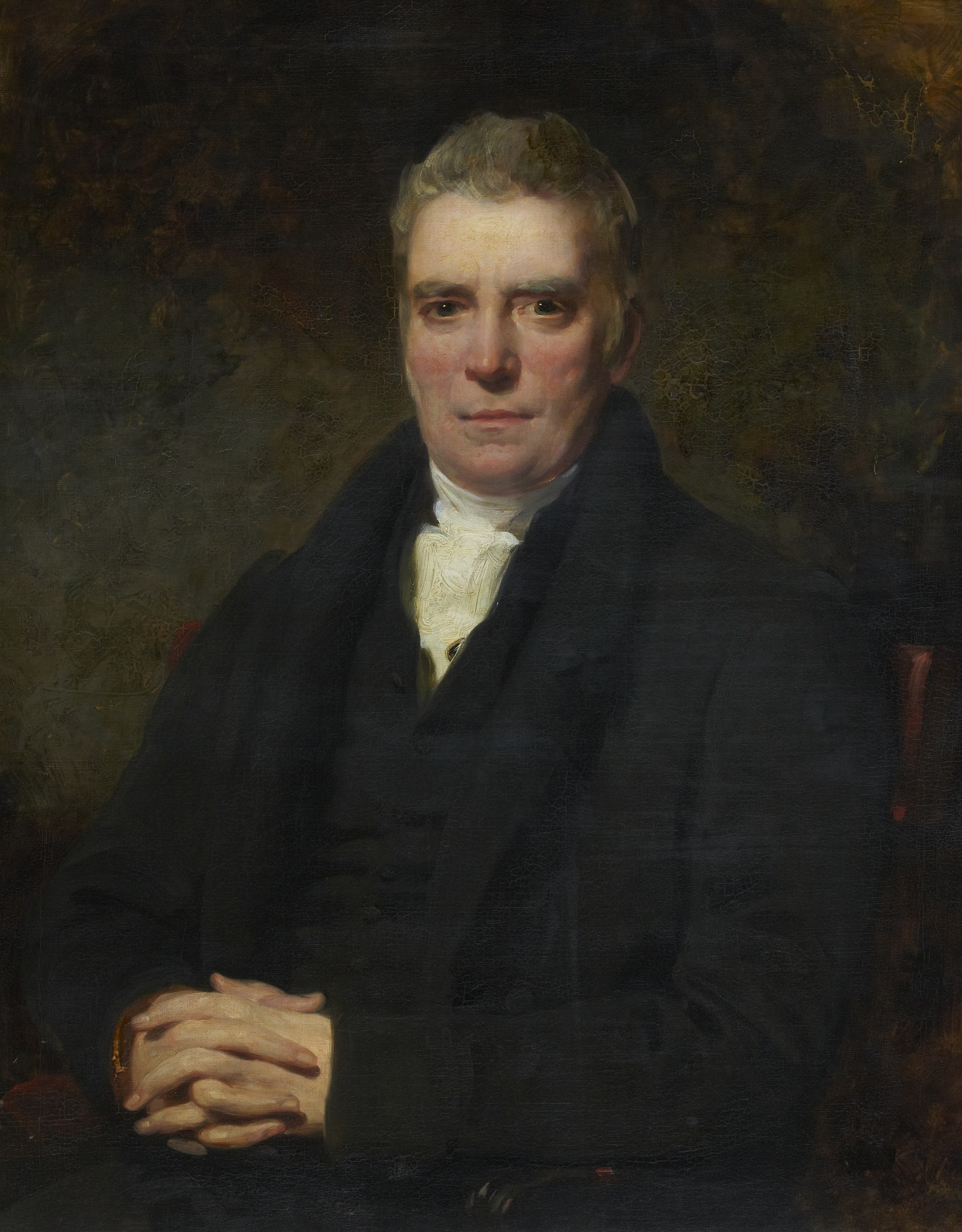
- Born: November 1772; Duns
- Died: 5 August 1835 (aged 62)
- Education: University of Edinburgh
- Occupations: Pastor, Theologian
- Theological work
- Tradition or movement: (1) Anti-Burgher (2) Auld Light (3) United Original Secession Church
- Main interests: Ecclesiology, Church History

Thomas M'Crie (sometimes known as Thomas McCree or Maccrae) (November 1772 – 5 August 1835) was a Scottish biographer and ecclesiastical historian, writer, and preacher born in the town of Duns, and educated at the University of Edinburgh. He became the leading minister of the Original Secession Church (Auld Licht Anti-Burgher). His work: "Life of Knox" (1813) was a means of vindicating the Scottish reformer John Knox who was a unpopular figure at the time. It was followed by a "Life of Andrew Melville" (1819). Melville was Knox's successor as the leader of the Reformers in Scotland. M'Crie also published histories of the Reformation in Italy and Spain. He received an honorary degree of D.D. in 1813, the first Secession minister to receive such an award.

== Early life and education ==
Thomas M'Crie (called the Elder to avoid confusion with his son "the Younger") was a Scottish seceding divine and ecclesiastical historian. He, (the Elder) was himself the eldest son of Thomas McCrie, a substantial linen-weaver, by his first wife Mary (Hood), was born at Duns, Berwickshire, in November 1772. After passing through the parish school, he became an elementary teacher in neighbouring schools. In 1788 he entered at the Edinburgh University, but did not graduate. He became, in May 1791, teacher of an Anti-burgher school at Brechin, Forfarshire. To qualify himself for the ministry, he studied divinity under Archibald Bruce of Whitburn, Linlithgowshire, professor of theology to the General Associate Synod (anti-burgher). He was licensed in September 1795 by the Associate Presbytery of Kelso, and ordained on 26 May 1796 as minister of the second associate congregation in Potterrow, Edinburgh. He early showed both literary and controversial ability.

== New testimony controversy ==
Since 1747, when the General Associate Synod seceded from the Associate Synod on the ground of the unlawfulness of the civic oath [see literature about Ebenezer Erskine and Adam Gib], changes had come over the minds of the Anti-burghers on the question of the mutual relations of civil and ecclesiastical authority. From the position that the civil power is to exercise itself in church matters under the guidance of ecclesiastical criticism, they had advanced to a view of the complete independence of church and state, and consequent denial of any place for civil authority in church affairs. This change of front was signalized by a 'new testimony,' adopted by the synod in May 1804. Bruce, McCrie, and two other ministers made repeated protests against this 'new testimony' as at variance with the older standards. At length, on 28 August 1806, they formed themselves into a "Constitutional Associate Presbytery". The synod deposed them (McCrie on 2 September) from the ministry. A lawsuit resulted (24 February 1809) in McCrie's ejection from the Potterrow meeting-house, when his congregation built a new one in Davie Street, out of West Richmond Street in Edinburgh. In 1827 the "Constitutional" body, joined by protesting members of the Burgher Synod, took the name of Original Seceders.

== Church historian ==
McCrie was drawn by this conflict about the first principles of ecclesiastical theory to a thorough and searching study of Scottish church history, in its organic connection with the national life, and with the general development of protestant civilisation. The first fruit of his labour was the life of Knox, finished in November 1811, Its breadth of treatment was something new in ecclesiastical biography. It effected a revolution in the public estimate of its subject, akin to that achieved by Carlyle's 'Cromwell,' though by different means. His biography of Melville (November 1819) pursues the theme of the Scottish national career under the influence of the Reformation. The post-Reformation church history of Scotland he did not treat with the same fulness: his life of Alexander Henderson, in the 'Christian Instructor,' vol. x., is little more than a personal sketch. Later he broke new ground in his histories of the Italian (1827) and Spanish (1829) movements of evangelical and free opinion at the era of the Reformation; which nothing is more admirable than the fairness of his dealing with schools of thought very different from his own. It is to be lamented that he did not live to execute a projected life of Calvin. 'His literary genius,' says Professor Lorimer, "was neither wholly historical nor wholly biographical, but found congenial employment in biographical history or historical biography, buying equal delight in the personal traits and minute facts appropriate to the one, and in the broad views and profound principles characteristic of the other. It is not often that biographers make good historians, or that historians are equally great in biography, but be was equally great in both" (Imperial Dict. of Biog. pt. xiii. p. 265).

== Divinity professor ==
On 3 February 1813 the Edinburgh University made him D.D., a degree often conferred on English nonconformists, but never before on a Scottish dissenter. After the death of Bruce, in 1816, McCrie acted till 1818 as his successor in the chair of divinity. Coincident with his entrance on this office, he published in the 'Christian Instructor' (January–March 1817) a powerful critique on Sir Walter Scott's representations of the covenanters (in Old Mortality), in which he proved himself a better antiquary than the great novelist (Scott, Journal, ii. 404 n.). Subsequently he published, either separately in magazines, a number of biographies and reviews of biographies, chiefly Scottish.

== Death and burial ==
McCrie died in Edinburgh on 5 August 1835, and was buried on 12 August, in Greyfriars' churchyard; a deputation from the general assembly of the church of Scotland attended the funeral.

== Denominational affiliations ==
McCrie's career illustrates the history of various denominations within the secession 'family'.

1. He was ordained in 1796 as a minister of the Anti-Burgher Secession Synod.

2. He was one of the 'Old Lights' who left the Anti-Burgher Secession Synod in 1806 to form the "Constitutional Associate Presbytery".

3. In 1827 the 'Old Light' Anti-Burgher Constitutional Associate Presbytery united with the 'Synod of Protesters' (which had left the New Licht' Anti-Burgher Synod in 1820-1) to form the 'Associate Synod of Original Seceders', also known as the Original Secession Church. McCrie remained a minister of this denomination until his death in 1835.

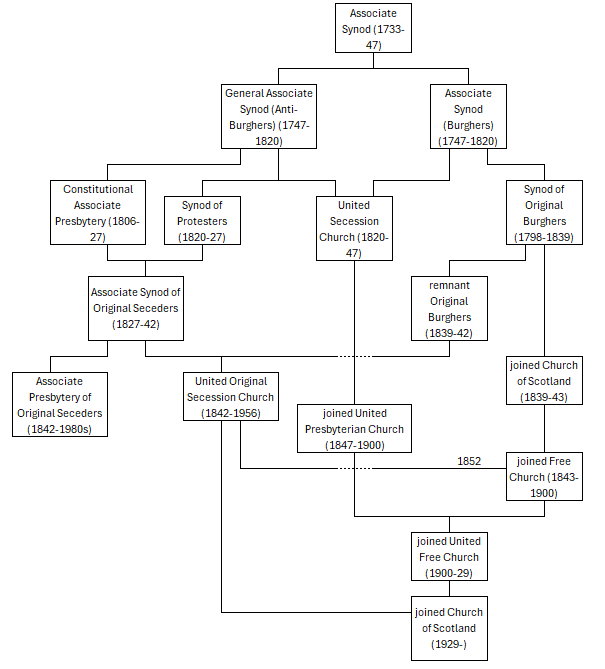
Secession church history

== Family ==
M'crie married twice, in 1796, he married Janet, daughter of William Dickson of Swinton, Berwickshire, by whom he had:

- (1) Thomas M'Crie {called the Younger}
- (2) William M'Crie, merchant in Edinburgh
- (3) Jessie M'Crie, married to Archibald Meikle of Flemington
- (4) John M'Crie, died October 1837
- (5) George M'Crie (1811–1878), minister of Clola, Aberdeenshire, poet, and author of The Religion of Our Literature (1875).

He married for a second time in 1827 to Mary, fourth daughter of Robert Chalmers, minister at Haddington, who survived him and received a pension from government on the ground of her husband's services to literature.

== Works ==
The chief of them was an Account of the concluding part of the Life and the Death of that illustrious man, John Knox, the most faithful Restorer of the Church of Scotland, being a translation from the work of Principal Smeton. It also included a Memoir of Mr. John Murray, minister of Leith and Dunfermline, in the beginning of the 17th century; a Sketch of the Progress of the Reformation in Spain, with an account of the Spanish Protestant Martyrs; The Suppression of the Reformation in Spain; the Life of Dr. Andrew Rivet, the French Protestant minister; the Life of Patrick Hamilton; the Life of Francis Lambert, of Avignon; and the Life of Alexander Henderson.

The journal in which they appeared was of limited circulation, and its literary merits were little appreciated so that these admirable articles were scarcely known beyond the small circle of subscribers to the Christian Magazine, most of whom were Seceders.

- The Duty of Christian Societies towards each other, in relation to the Measures for Propagating the Gospel, which at present engage the attention of the Religious World; a Sermon, preached in the meeting-house, Potter Row, on occasion of a Collection for promoting a Mission to Kentucky. 1797.
- Statement of the Difference between the Profession of the Reformed Church of Scotland as adopted by Seceders, and the Profession contained in the New Testimony and other Acts lately adopted by the General Associate Synod; particularly on the Power of Civil Magistrates respecting Religion, National Reformation, National Churches, and National Covenants. Edinburgh, 1807.
- Letters on the late Catholic Bill, and the Discussions to which it has given rise. Addressed to British Protestants, and chiefly Presbyterians in Scotland. By a Scots Presbyterian. Edinburgh, 1807.
- Free Thoughts on the late Religious Celebration of the Funeral of her Royal Highness the Princess Charlotte of Wales; and on the Discussion to which it has given rise in Edinburgh. By Scoto Britannus. 1817.
- Two Discourses on the Unity of the Church, her Divisions, and their Removal. Edinburgh, 1821.
- Sermons (posthumous volume). Edinburgh, 1836.
- Lectures on the Book of Esther (posthumous), Edinburgh, 1838.

Academic offices
Preceded by Archibald Bruce	Professor of Theology of the 'Old Light' Anti-Burgher Secession Church in Scotland; 1816-1818	Vacant Title next held by George Paxton as Professor of Theology of the Original Secession Church in Scotland
