= George Paxton (minister) =

Scottish minister, professor, and poet

Personal details
- Born: 2 April 1762 Bolton
- Died: 9 April 1837 (aged 75) Edinburgh
- Buried: West Kirk

George Paxton (2 April 1762 – 9 April 1837) was a Scottish secession minister and poet. He was the professor of divinity of the 'New Licht' Anti-Burgher General Associate Synod.

== Life ==
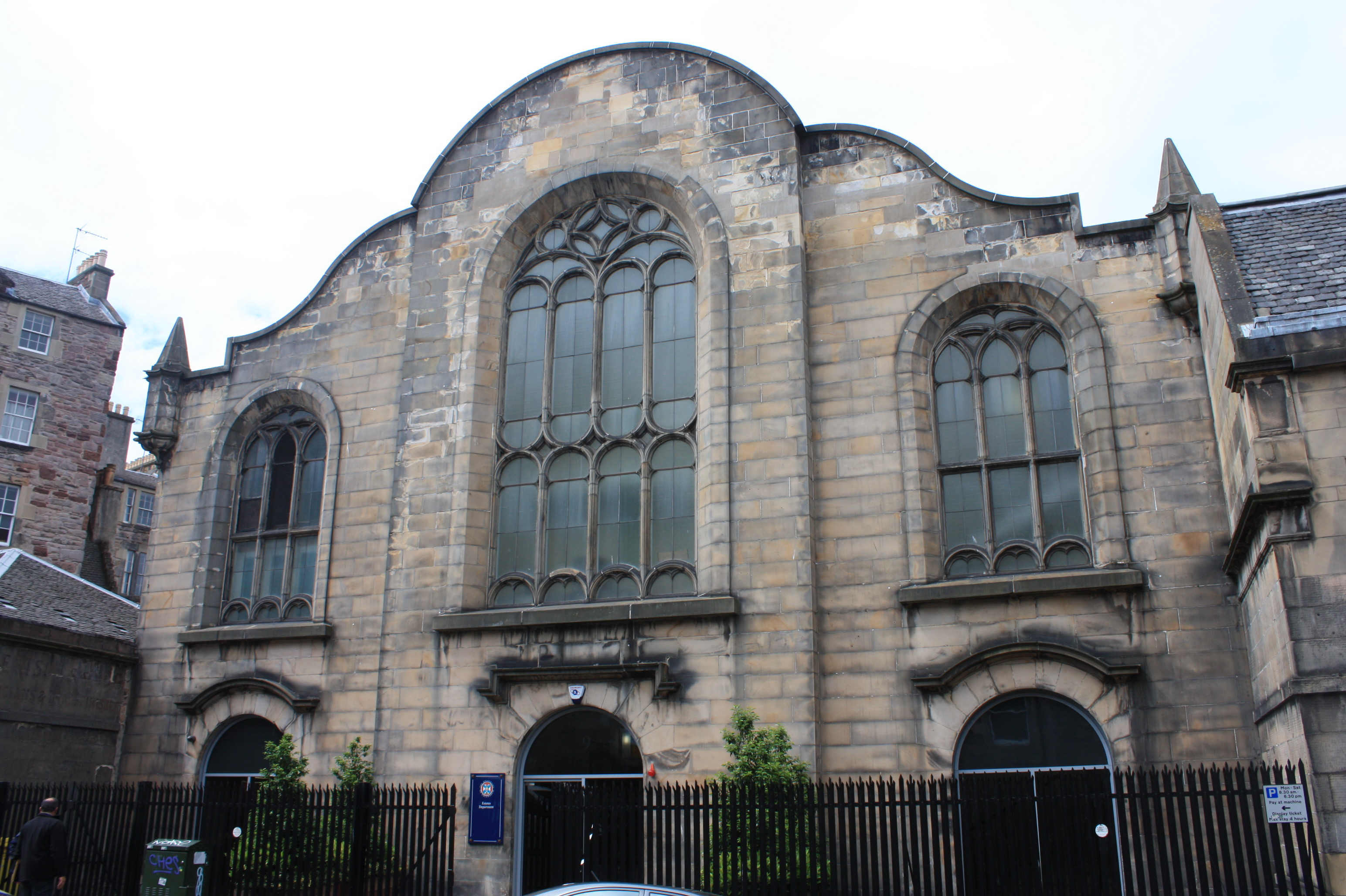
Paxton's Secessionist Church, Infirmary Street, Edinburgh

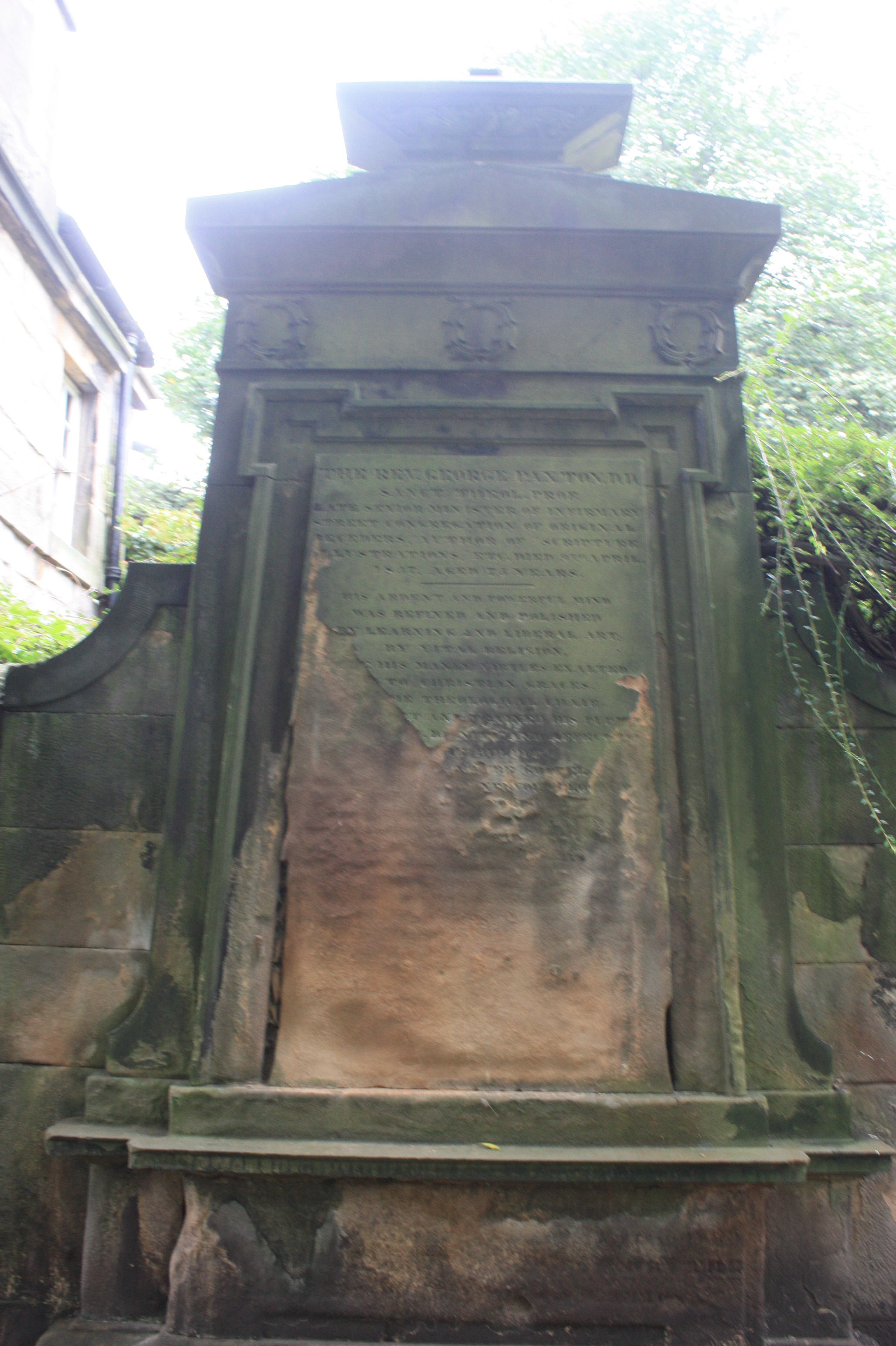
The grave of Rev George Paxton, St Cuthberts Churchyard, Edinburgh

=== Background ===
Paxton was born on 2 April 1762 at Dalgourie, on the edge of Bolton, East Lothian. He was the eldest son of Jean Milne and William Paxton a joiner and carpenter. In early childhood he moved with his family to Melrose, then again to Makerstoun, near Kelso. Here a local laird, Sir Hay McDougal, a colonel in the Scots Greys, took Paxton under his wing.

=== Education ===
Sir Hay sent George to Kelso to learn Latin and Greek. After an unfinished apprenticeship as a carpenter, he left his home town to attend the University of Edinburgh but left in 1784 without a degree. He continued his education with the private tutor Reverend William Moncrieff in Alloa. Here he became "a firm seceder".

=== Ordination and secession ===
In March 1788 George received his licence to preach and was ordained as minister of the joint parishes of Kilmaurs and Stewarton in August 1789, choosing to live in the latter village. Owing to ill-health, around 1800, he was forced to abandon this job, and take a 7-year respite. However, the 'New Licht' Anti-Burgher General Associate Synod appointed him as professor of divinity in 1807. In 1820 he disagreed with the decision of the 'New Licht' Anti-Burgher Synod to unite with the 'New Licht' Burgher Synod to form the United Secession Church, and was forced to resign his professorship. He then set up a secession church, in an old chapel on the steps of the Vennel, in a hidden location off the Grassmarket in Edinburgh. Together with Dr George Stevenson of Ayr, he led "A conservative 'clique' ... forming the 'Synod of Protesters' in May 1821." In 1822 he commissioned Thomas Brown to build a new church on Infirmary Street, just off South Bridge. Together with the 'Auld Licht' Anti-Burghers led by Reverend Thomas M'Crie the Elder they formed the Associate Synod of Original Seceders in May 1827. He was then invited to resume his professorship acting for this new body. In 1828 he is shown as a member of the Edinburgh Bible Society under the leadership of Lord Glenorchy.

In the 1830s he is listed as living at 12 Archibald Place, off Lauriston Place, near to George Heriot’s School on the south side of Edinburgh.

=== Death and memorial ===
George Paxton died in Edinburgh on 9 April 1837 and is buried in the "West Kirk" burial ground, generally now known as St Cuthbert’s Churchyard. The tall monument stands against the south-west wall. The stone is eroding and the lower text is now lost, but the whole memorial was transcribed in the early part of the 19th century and read:

The Rev. GEORGE PAXTON D.D. Sanct. Theol. Prof. late senior minister of Infirmary Street Congregation of Original Seceders, author of "Scripture Illustrations" etc., died 9th April 1837 aged 75 years.

His education in the liberal arts shaped his intellectual development, and his religious convictions informed his personal conduct. In his academic role, he instructed students in theology. As a preacher, he delivered sermons rooted in evangelical doctrine, and as a pastor, he visited and supported members of his congregation. Throughout his life he was committed to religious service, and in his later years he left a statement affirming Scotland's commitments to religion and civil liberty, which he maintained until his death.

Surbase: In memory of a respected and beloved pastor this stone was erected by the members of the congregation.

Base: MARGARET JOHNSTON his widow, died 4th May 1850.

== Family ==
Paxton married Elizabeth Armstrong of Kelso in 1790. Their marriage was cut short by her death in 1800. Together they had two sons and three daughters.

His daughter, Jean, married the Reverend John More of Cairneyhill in Fife.

His son, George, became a doctor and rose to fame in India.

Paxton married a second time, to Margaret Johnstone, daughter of a Berwick farmer.

== Publications ==
- An Inquiry into the Obligation of Religious Covenants upon Posterity (1801)
- Healing the Divisions in our Church (1802)
- The Villager and other Poems (1813)
- Illustrations of the Holy Scriptures 3 vols (1822)

Academic offices
Preceded by Archibald Bruce as Professor of Theology of the Anti-Burgher Secession; Church in Scotland	Professor of Theology of the 'New Light' Anti-Burgher; Secession Church in Scotland; 1807-1820	Succeeded by John Dick as Professor of Theology of the United Secession Church
New title	Professor of Theology of the Synod of Protesters; 1820-1827	Succeeded by Himself as Professor of Theology of the Original Secession Church in Scotland
Preceded by Himself as Professor of Theology of the Synod of Protesters	Professor of Theology of the Original Secession Church in Scotland; 1827-1836	Succeeded by Thomas M'Crie the Younger
