= Carl Friedrich Keil =

German Lutheran Old Testament commentator (1807–1888)

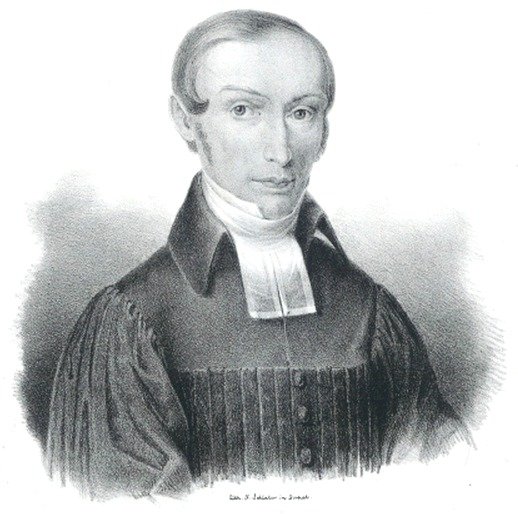
- Born: 26 February 1807; Lauterbach near Oelsnitz, Kingdom of Saxony
- Died: 5 May 1888 (aged 81); Rödlitz near Lichtenstein, Kingdom of Saxony
- Other name: Johann Friedrich Karl Keil
- Occupation: Lutheran theologian
- Known for: Old Testament commentary

Johann Friedrich Karl Keil or Carl Friedrich Keil (26 February 1807 – 5 May 1888) was a conservative German Lutheran Old Testament commentator.

== Biography ==
Keil was born at Lauterbach near Oelsnitz, in the Kingdom of Saxony. He was appointed to the theological faculty of Dorpat in Estonia, where he taught Bible, New Testament exegesis, and oriental languages. In 1859 he was called to serve the Lutheran church in Leipzig. In 1887 he moved to Rödletz, where he died.

Keil was a conservative critic who reacted strongly against the scientific biblical criticism of his day. He strongly supported Mosaic authorship of the Pentateuch. He maintained the validity of the historico-critical investigation of the Bible only if it proved the existence of New Testament revelation in the Scriptures. To this aim he edited (with Franz Delitzsch) his principal work, a commentary on the Bible, Biblischer Kommentar über das Alte Testament (5 vols., 1866–82; Biblical Commentary on the Old Testament, 5 vols., 1872–77). The work remains his most enduring contribution to biblical studies. He also published commentaries on Maccabees and New Testament literature. and died at Rätz, Saxony.

He is best known for his contributions to the Keil and Delitzsch commentaries, a ten-volume set written with Franz Delitzsch.

Keil was a student of Ernst Wilhelm Hengstenberg.

== Works ==
- Keil, Carl Friedrich (1869). Douglas, George C. M. (ed.). Manual of historico-critical introduction to the canonical scriptures of the Old Testament. Vol. 1 (2 ed.). Edinburgh: T. & T. Clark.
- Keil, Carl Friedrich (1882). Douglas, George C. M. (ed.). Manual of historico-critical introduction to the canonical scriptures of the Old Testament. Vol. 2 (2 ed.). Edinburgh: T. & T. Clark.
- Keil, Carl Friedrich (1827–1889). Frederick, Crombie (ed.). Manual of Biblical Archaeology introduction to biblical archaeology. Vol. 2 (2 ed.). Edinburgh: T. & T. Clark.

=== Old Testament Commentary ===
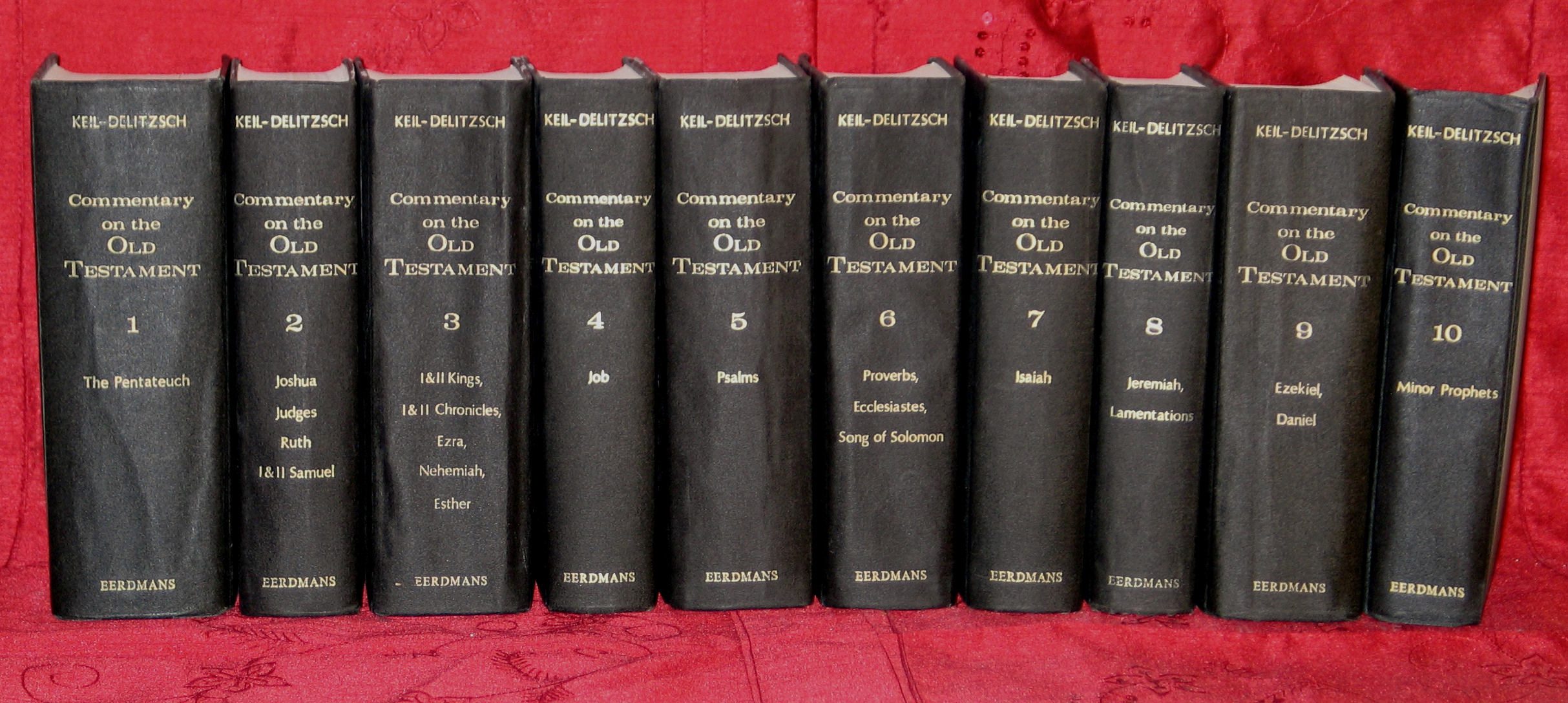
Keil–Delitzsch: Commentary on the Old Testament I–X. Grand Rapids 1975.

From the commentary compilations by Keil and Delitzsch:

- Volume 1: Pentateuch
- Volume 2: Joshua, Judges, Ruth, 1 & 2 Samuel
- Volume 3: 1 & 2 Kings, 1 & 2 Chronicles
- Volume 4: Ezra, Nehemiah, Esther, Job
- Volume 5: Psalms
- Volume 6: Proverbs, Ecclesiastes, Song of Songs
- Volume 7: Isaiah
- Volume 8: Jeremiah, Lamentations
- Volume 9: Ezekiel, Daniel
- Volume 10: Minor Prophets
