= Original Secession Church =

Timeline showing the evolution of the churches of Scotland from 1560

The Original Secession Church or United Original Secession Church was a Scottish Presbyterian denomination formed in 1827 by the union of (1) the Anti-Burgher Old Lights, led by Thomas M'Crie the Elder and known as "the Constitutional Associate Presbytery" and (2) the portion of the Anti-Burgher New Lights that refused to merge with the Burgher New Lights, led by George Paxton and known as "the Synod of Protesters". The title 'United Original Secession Church' was adopted in 1842, after the 'Original Secession Church', by then led by Thomas M'Crie the Younger, united with the portion of the Burgher Old Lights that refused to merge with the Church of Scotland. In 1852 some of its members, including Thomas M'Crie the Younger, merged with the Free Church of Scotland formed by the Disruption of 1843. In 1956 the remainder of the Original Secession Church merged with the Church of Scotland.

== Notable Original Secession churchmen ==
- Thomas M'Crie, the elder (died 1835)
- Thomas M'Crie, the younger (died 1875)
- George Paxton (died 1837)

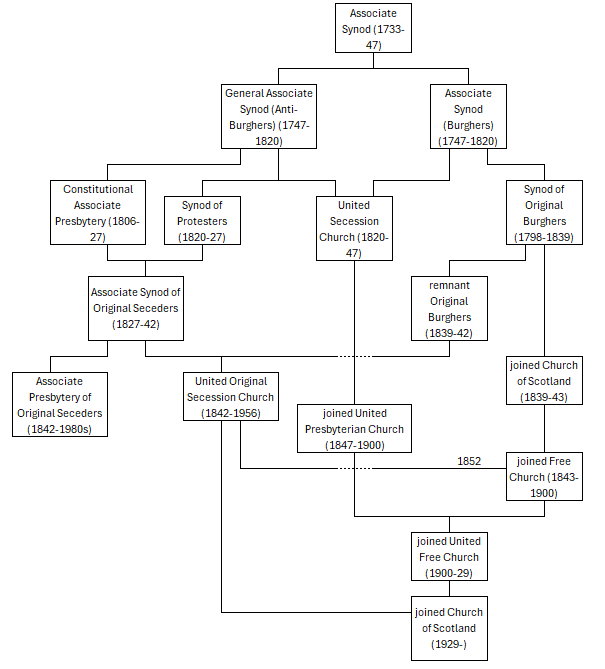
Secession church history

== OSC churches that joined the Free Church in 1852 ==
Church	Subsequent history
Arbroath Maule Street (majority)	Became Arbroath High Street Free Church, then Arbroath High St UFC. U/w East 1924 to form Arb. St Ninian's UFC.
Balmullo (majority)	Seems to have disappeared about 1859.
Birsay (small part)	Suppressed 1854,
Brechin: South Port	Minority of Brechin Antiburgher Church refused to join the USC in 1820. Became Brechin South Free Church 1852. Suppressed 1854 whereupon most of the congregation joined Brechin UPC.
Carnoustie	Became Carnoustie Second Charge Free Church. Left for RPC 1860, rejoined OSC in 1876 (see below).
Clola	Became Clola UFC, then Deer Clola Parish Church. United with Deer and Ardallie 1975 to form Deer Parish Church.
Colmonell (part)	Became Colmonell Free Church, then Colmonell UFC. Status reduced 1927.
Dollar	Absorbed into Dollar and Muckhart Free Church 1852.
Dundee: Meadowfield	Absorbed into Dundee Dudhope Free Church 1853.
Edinburgh: Davie Street	Named McCrie Free Church from 1858. United with Roxburgh Free Church 1886 to form McCrie-Roxburgh Free Church.
Greenlaw	Merged with Greenlaw Free Church in 1856.
Haddington	Became Haddington Knox's Free Church. Absorbed into Haddington St John's Free Church 1871.
Kirkcaldy Linktown	1820 split from Kirkcaldy Antiburgher. Became Kirkcaldy Dunnikier Free Church 1852. UFC 1900. Parish Church 1929. U/w Victoria Road to form Kirkcaldy St Andrew's PC 1972.
Kirkwall	Absorbed into Kirkwall Free Church 1853.
Leith: Junction Street (joined OSC 1848)	Named Leith Trinity Free Church from 1863, and Leith Elder Memorial Free Church from 1899. Absorbed into Leith St John's United Free Church 1907.
Longridge	Transported to Crofthead 1870. Became Fauldhouse UFC 1900, then Fauldhouse Crofthead Parish Church 1929. United with Fauldhouse Parish Church 1973 to form Fauldhouse St Andrew's Parish Church.
Thurso (part)	Became Thurso West Free Church, then Thurso West UFC 1900, then Thurso West Parish Church 1929. United with other parishes to form North Coast and the Flows Parish Church 2025.
Whitburn	Became Whitburn UFC 1900, then Whitburn Brucefield Parish Church 1929. United with Blackburn Parish Church 2000? to form Whitburn Burnfield Valley North Parish Church.
Yetholm	Became Yetholm St James' UFC in 1900. United with Yetholm Border View UFC 1914 to form Yetholm UFC.

== OSC churches that remained in the OSC after 1852 ==
Church	Subsequent history
Aberdeen: Skene Terrace	Founded 1807 as Constitutional Anti-Burgher. Became OSC 1827. Dissolved 1908.
Arbroath Maule Street (minority)	Refused to join the CoS in 1956; eventually merged with a congregational church.
Auchinleck	Dissolved 1928.
Ayr	Dissolved 1944.
Balmullo (minority)	Dissolved 1878.
Birsay (part)	Joined the CoS in 1956. Became Birsay Swannayside Parish Church, absorbed into Birsay PC 1957.
Carluke	Joined the CoS in 1956. Became Carluke Kirkstyle Parish Church. Dissolved 1969.
Carnoustie	Joined Free Church 1852, then RPC 1860, then OSC 1876. Dissolved 1919.
Cheltenham	Existed as an OSC church c. 1877-1880. Left OSC, still in existence as Whaddon Road Evangelical Presb. Church.
Colmonell (part)	Dissolved c. 1878.
Coronary and Cartlehill	Received from the Irish Secession Church, 1921. Joined Presbyterian Church of Ireland 1955.
Coupar Angus	Dissolved c. 1893.
Darvel	Split from Darvel RPC (which had joined the Free Church), joined OSC 1883. Dissolved 1941.
Dromore	Formerly Ballylintagh. Majority remained in OSC. United with Toberdoney and joined Presbyterian Church of Ireland 1955.
Dundee	Joined the CoS in 1956. Became Dundee Euclid Crescent Parish Church. Dissolved 1968.
Edinburgh: Adam Square	Dissolved 1879.
Edinburgh: Victoria Terrace	Separated from Adam Square 1857. Dissolved 1956.
Glasgow: Bridgeton	Founded as a 'church plant' 1876. Joined the CoS in 1956. Became Binnie Place Parish Church, dissolved 1964.
Glasgow: Laurieston	Founded 1872 out of Glasgow Mains Street. Dissolved 1920s.
Glasgow: Mains Street	Joined the CoS in 1956. Dissolved 1964.
Kilmarnock: Fowlds Street	Dissolved 1947.
Kilwinning	Joined the Free Church in 1956. Still in existence, co-joined with Ayr Free Church.
Kirkcaldy	Dissolved 1956.
Kirkintilloch	Joined the United Free Church 1902. Became Kirkintilloch South Church of Scotland 1929. Dissolved 1951.
Kirriemuir	Dissolved some time after 1899.
Midlem	Dissolved 1939.
Olrig	Joined OSC 1857 from Free Church. Dissolved between 1908 and 1914.
Paisley	Split from Paisley RPC (which had joined the Free Church), joined OSC 1885. Joined the CoS in 1956. Became Paisley Wellmeadow Parish Church. United with St George's East to form Paisley St Matthew's, 1969.
Perth	Joined the CoS in 1956. Became Perth St Luke's Parish Church. Dissolved 1958.
Pollokshaws: Cogan Street	Joined the CoS in 1956. Became Shawholm Parish Church. United w/ Auldfield to form Pollokshaws 1965.
Shottsburn	Joined the CoS in 1956. Absorbed into Kirk o' Shotts Parish Church 1975.
Stranraer	Dissolved c. 1920.
Thurso (part)	Dissolved 1913.
Toberdoney or Ballylintagh	United with Dromore and joined Presbyterian Church of Ireland 1955.

== Sources ==
- Morton, R (1911). "Presbyterians; I. Scotland". In Johann Jakob Herzog, Philip Schaff (ed.). New Schaff-Herzog Encyclopedia of Religious Knowledge. Vol. IX: Petri - Reuchlin. p. 215.
- Scott, David (1886). Annals and statistics of the original Secession church: till its disruption and union with the Free church of Scotland in 1852. Edinburgh : A. Elliot.
