= Walter Chalmers Smith =

British author and clergyman

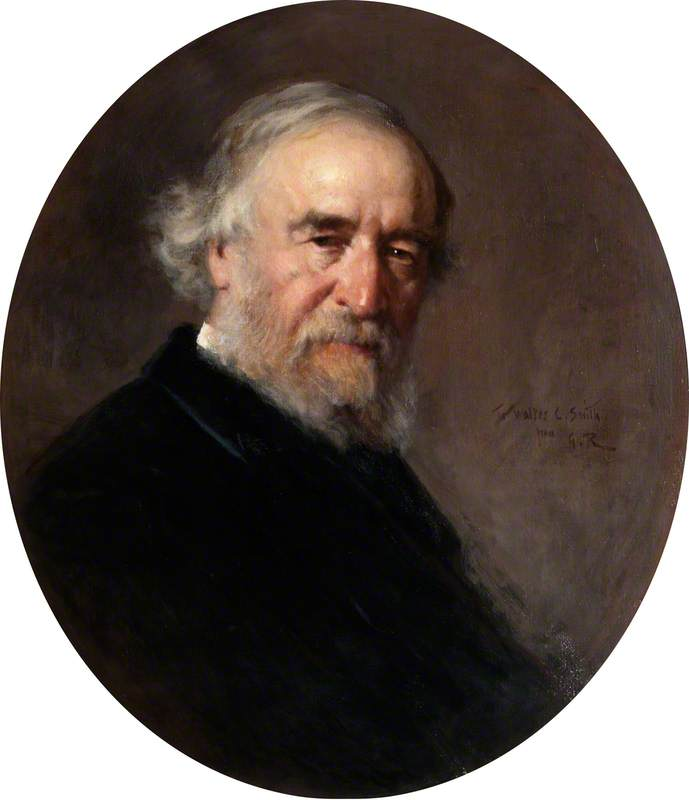
- Walter Chalmers Smith by George Reid

Personal details
- Born: 5 December 1824 Aberdeen, Aberdeenshire
- Died: 19 September 1908 (aged 83) Dunblane, Perthshire

Walter Chalmers Smith (5 December 1824 – 19 September 1908), was a hymnist, author, poet and minister of the Free Church of Scotland, chiefly remembered for his hymn "Immortal, Invisible, God Only Wise". In 1893 he served as Moderator of the General Assembly for the Free Church of Scotland. He attained considerable reputation as a poet. Some of these works were written under the names of Orwell or Hermann Kunst.

== Early life and education ==
He was born in Aberdeen on 5 December 1824, the son of Walter Smith, a cabinet-maker living at 16 Blackfriars Street, by his wife Barbara Milne He was educated at the grammar school, Aberdeen, and at Marischal College, which he entered at the age of thirteen, graduating M.A. in 1841. His original intention was to adopt law as his profession, but under the influence of Dr. Chalmers he entered the New College, Edinburgh, to study for the ministry of the Free Church of Scotland.

== Church ministries ==
In 1850 he was ordained pastor of the Free (Scottish) Church in Chadwell Street, Pentonville, London. The small congregation did not become larger under his ministry. In 1853 he resigned and was appointed to Milnathort, in the parish of Orwell, Kinross-shire; and in 1857 he removed to Roxburgh Free Church, Edinburgh. In 1862 he was chosen to succeed the Free Church leader, Dr. Robert Buchanan, in the Free Tron Church, Glasgow. In 1876 he transferred to the Free High Kirk in Edinburgh (part of the New College building).

Once settled in Edinburgh he lived at 20 Royal Circus in the New Town.

Smith was a thoughtful preacher, catholic in his sympathies, and of rather advanced opinions for the Free Church of his time, though in the end his influence was felt in broadening its outlook. Two ‘Discourses’ that he published in 1866, advocating more liberal views in regard to Sunday observance than those then prevailing in Scotland, came under the ban of his Presbytery, and he was ‘affectionately admonished’ by the General Assembly in June 1867. In 1876 he was translated to the Free High Church, Edinburgh. During the prosecution of Professor Robertson Smith his strong sympathy with the professor gave some offence to the orthodox church leaders; but in 1893 he had so won the confidence of the church that he was chosen moderator of the general assembly.

== Legacy ==
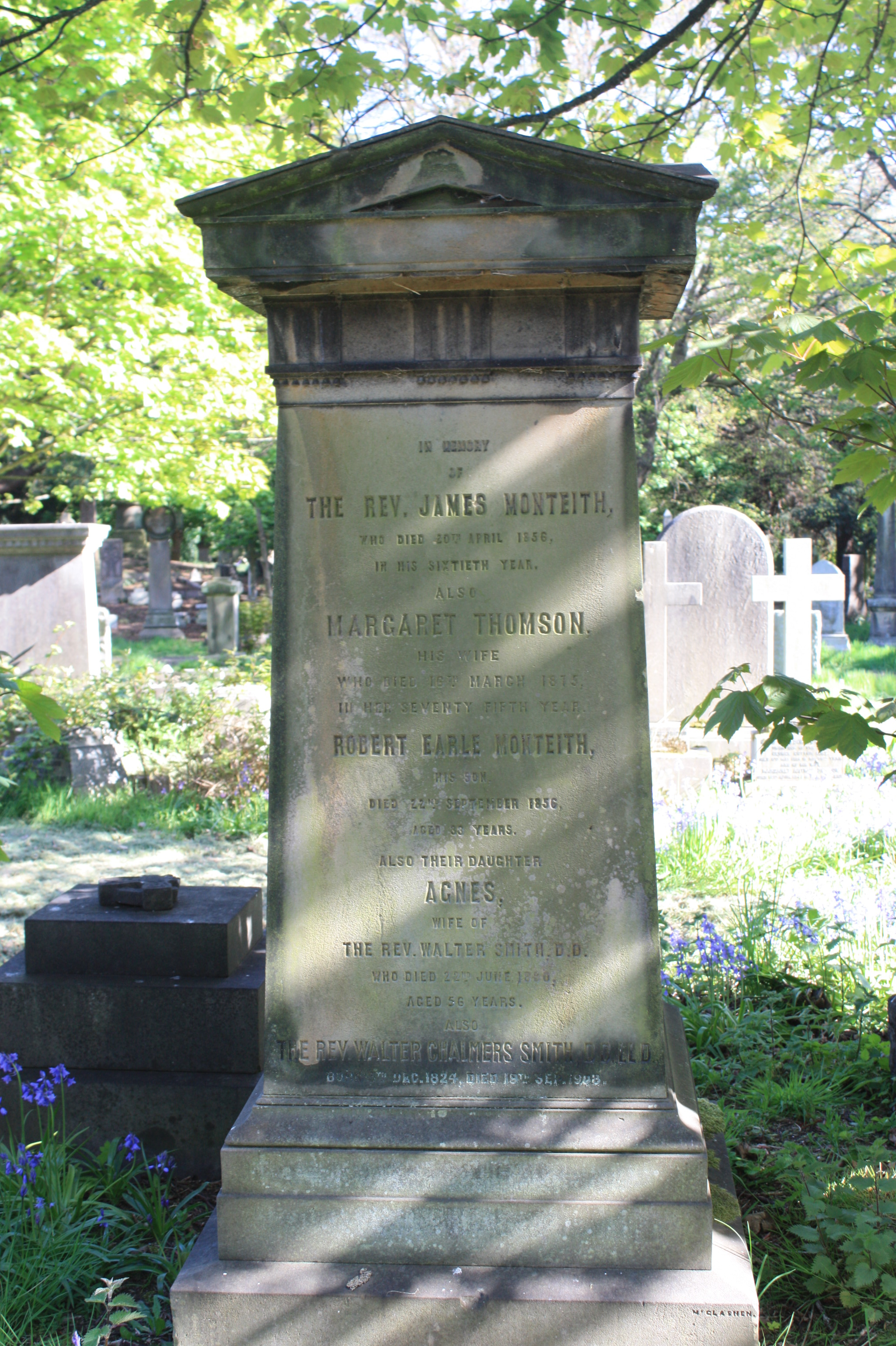
The grave of Rev Walter Chalmers Smith, Warriston Cemetery, Edinburgh

He received the degrees of D.D. from the University of Glasgow (1869), and LL.D. from the universities of Aberdeen (1876) and Edinburgh (1893). He was mentioned in Lord Adam Gifford's will.

He was Moderator of the General Assembly, the highest position in the Free Church, 1893/94 and retired in 1894 on completion of this role. He was succeeded by George C. M. Douglas.

He died at Kinbuck near Dunblane on 19 or 20 September 1908. He is buried in the grave of his father-in-law, Rev James Monteith, in Warriston Cemetery in north Edinburgh. The grave lies just south of the central vaults.

== Family ==
In 1853 he was married to Agnes Monteith (1830–1886) daughter of James Monteith.

== Artistic recognition ==
He was painted by Sir George Reid RSA.

== Published works ==
Letter by Smith (1884)

Smith wrote novels, religious works and poems including

- The Bishop's Walk (1860)
- Hymns of Christ and the Christian Life (1867)
- Olrig Grange (1872)
- Borland Hall (1874)
- Hilda Among the Broken Gods (1878)
- Raban, or Life Splinters (1880)
- North Country Folk (1883)
- Kildrostan (1884)
- Thoughts and Fancies for Sunday Evenings (1887)
- A Heretic and Other Poems (1890)

He attained considerable reputation as a poet. Some of these works were written under the names of Orwell or Hermann Kunst.

=== Hymns ===
- Earth was waiting, spent and restless
- Immortal, invisible, God only wise This remains a popular hymn still in use in the 21st century.
