= Archibald Bruce (writer) =

Scottish theological writer

Archibald Bruce (1746–1816), was a Scottish theological writer.

== Life ==
Bruce was born at Broomhall, Stirlingshire, and, after studying at the University of Glasgow, was ordained, in 1768, minister of the Associate (Anti-Burgher) congregation of Whitburn. In 1786 he was appointed professor of divinity by the General Associate Synod, and continued to hold that office till 1806. Being dissatisfied with the action of his synod, he left it and formed, along with Thomas M'Crie the Elder and two others, the 'Auld Licht' Anti-Burgher 'Constitutional Associate Presbytery'. This led to a sentence of deposition being passed on him by the former body. He died 28 February 1816.

== Writings ==
Bruce's major writings were:

- The Kirkiad, or the Golden Age of the Church of Scotland, a satirical poem, 1774.
- Free Thoughts on the Toleration of Popery, 1780.
- Annus Secularis, the centenary of the revolution 1788, a long dissertation on religious festivals.
- Queries, on the commemoration of the revolution, 1797.
- The Catechism modernized, 1791, a cutting satire on lay patronage, and its effects, in the form of a parody on the Westminster Assembly's Shorter Catechism.
- Reflexions on the Freedom of Writing, 1794, à propos of a proclamation against seditious publications, bearing the motto "What Britons dare to think, he dares to tell".
- A poem ridiculing the pretensions of the pope, 1797.
- Lectures to Students, 1797.
- Life of James Hog of Carnock, 1798.
- Dissertation on the Supremacy of the Civil Power in Matters of Religion, 1798.
- Poems, serious and amusing, by a reverend divine, 1812.
- Life of Alex. Morus, a celebrated divine in Geneva and Holland, 1813.
- A Treatise on Earthquakes (posthumous).

Academic offices
Preceded by William Moncrieff	Professor of Theology of the Anti-Burgher Secession Church in Scotland; 1786-1806	Succeeded by George Paxton as Professor of Theology of the 'New Light' Anti-Burgher; Secession Church in Scotland
Preceded by William Moncrieff	Professor of Theology of the Anti-Burgher Secession Church in Scotland; 1786-1806	Succeeded by Himself as Professor of Theology of the 'Old Light' Anti-Burgher; Secession Church in Scotland
Preceded by Himself as Professor of Theology of the Anti-Burgher; Secession Church in Scotland	Professor of Theology of the 'Old Light' Anti-Burgher Secession Church in Scotland; 1806-1816	Succeeded by Thomas M'Crie the Elder
