= Immortal, Invisible, God Only Wise =

Christian hymn by Walter Chalmers Smith

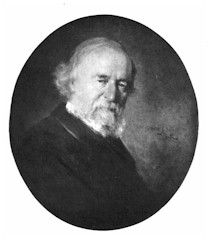
- Walter Chalmers Smith
- Genre: Hymn
- Text: Walter Chalmers Smith
- Based on: 1 Timothy 1:17
- Meter: 11.11.11.11
- Melody: "St. Denio", Welsh folksong, arranged and published in 1839 by John Roberts
- Published: 1867 (in Hymns of Christ and the Christian Life (MacMillan & Co.)

"Immortal, Invisible, God Only Wise" is a Christian hymn with words by the Free Church of Scotland minister, Walter Chalmers Smith, usually sung to the tune, "St. Denio", originally a Welsh ballad tune, which became a hymn (under the name "Palestrina") in Caniadau y Cyssegr ("Hymns of the Sanctuary", 1839) edited by John Roberts (Welsh bardic name: Ieuan Gwyllt) (1822–1877). Of this hymn, musicologist Erik Routley has written:

"[Immortal, Invisible] should give the reader a moment's pause. Most readers will think they know this hymn, the work of another Free Kirk minister. But it never now appears as its author wrote it, and a closer look at it in its fuller form shows that it was by no means designed to be one of those general hymns of praise that the parson slams into the praise-list when he is in too much of a hurry to think of anything else but a hymn about the reading of Scripture. Just occasionally editorial tinkering changes the whole personality of a hymn; it has certainly done so here."

== Lyrics ==
Lyrics given in most English hymnals:

Immortal, invisible, God only wise,
In light inaccessible hid from our eyes,
Most blessèd, most glorious, the Ancient of Days,
Almighty, victorious, thy great Name we praise.

Unresting, unhasting, and silent as light,
Nor wanting, nor wasting, thou rulest in might;
Thy justice like mountains high soaring above
Thy clouds which are fountains of goodness and love.

To all life thou givest—to both great and small;
In all life thou livest, the true life of all;
We blossom and flourish as leaves on the tree,
And wither and perish—but nought changeth thee.

Great Father of glory, pure Father of light,
Thine angels adore thee, all veiling their sight;
All laud we would render: O help us to see
’Tis only the splendour of light hideth thee.

— New English Hymnal

Original version of last two stanzas from Hymns of Christ and the Christian Life, 1867.

[vv1-3 as before, then]

Great Father of glory, pure Father of light,
Thine angels adore Thee, all veiling their sight;
But of all Thy rich graces this grace, Lord, impart
Take the veil from our faces, the vile from our heart.

All laud we would render; O help us to see
’Tis only the splendour of light hideth Thee,
And so let Thy glory, Almighty, impart,
Through Christ in His story, Thy Christ to the heart.
