= Anti-Burgher =

Scottish Presbyterian faction, 1747 – mid 1800s

Timeline showing the evolution of the churches of Scotland from 1560

The Anti-Burghers were opponents of the Burgher Oath on theological grounds.

== History ==
=== First Secession ===
In 1733, the First Secession from the Church of Scotland resulted in the creation of the "Associate Presbytery". The church split in 1747 over the issue of the Burgher Oath, which required holders of public offices to affirm approval of the religion "presently professed in this kingdom". The issue was civil compulsion in religious affairs, a forerunner of later arguments over the separation of church and state. Opponents of the Burgher Oath on theological grounds became known as the Anti-Burgher and showed a distinctive independence of conviction and an unwillingness to compromise over sincerely held beliefs. The Burgher and the Anti-Burgher factions thus formed the rival independent synods: the General Associate Synod (Anti-Burghers) and the Associate Synod (Burghers).

=== "Auld Licht" and "New Licht" ===
Eventually both the Burghers and Anti-Burghers had further splits: the Burghers in 1798 and the Anti-Burghers in 1806. Both factions formed their own, separate "Auld Licht" (old light) and "New Licht" factions. The more Calvinistic "Auld Lichts" held to the obligations of the Solemn League and Covenant, the "New Lichts" were more theologically liberal, a notable and continuing influence in the post-1847 United Presbyterian Church of Scotland.

=== New Licht Anti-Burghers ===
In 1820, the majority of the New Licht Anti-Burghers united with the New Licht Burghers as the United Secession Church. "A conservative 'clique' led by Professor George Paxton and Dr Stevenson [George Stevenson of Ayr] forming the 'Synod of Protesters' in May 1821." The United Secession Church in turn united with the Relief Church in 1847 to create the United Presbyterian Church of Scotland. The United Presbyterian Church united with most of the Free Church of Scotland in 1900 to create the United Free Church of Scotland, most of whom ultimately reunited with the Church of Scotland in 1929.

=== Auld Licht Anti-Burghers ===
The Anti-Burgher Auld Lichts formed the Constitutional Associate Presbytery. The four ministers who constituted it were James Aitken of Kirriemuir, Archibald Bruce, James Hog of Kelso and Thomas M'Crie the elder. The "Synod of Protesters" including George Paxton (minister) joined it in 1827 and it became the Original Secession Church. In 1842, the body united with the portion of the Old Light Burgher Synod which had not joined the Church of Scotland in 1839, to form the United Original Secession Church. The church split in 1852, with one party joining in the Free Church of Scotland and the others finally reuniting with the Church of Scotland in 1956.

The careers of the father and son Thomas M'Crie the Elder and Thomas M'Crie the Younger illustrate the history of various Scottish denominations.

1. The father was ordained in 1796 as a minister of the Anti-Burgher Secession Synod.

2. The father was one of the 'Old Lights' who left the Anti-Burgher Secession Synod in 1806 to form the "Constitutional Associate Presbytery".

3, The son was ordained in 1821 as a minister of the 'Old Light' Anti-Burgher "Constitutional Associate Presbytery". The father and the son served together as ministers of that Presbytery for the remainder of its existence.

4. In 1827 the 'Old Light' Anti-Burgher Constitutional Associate Presbytery united with the 'Synod of Protesters' (which had left the New Licht' Anti-Burgher Synod in 1820-1) to form the 'Associate Synod of Original Seceders', also known as the Original Secession Church. The father and the son served together as ministers of this Church until the father's death in 1835, after which the son continued to serve as such for the remainder of the church's existence.

5. In 1842 the Original Secession Church united with the portion of the Old Light Burghers which had refused to merge with the Church of Scotland, to form the 'United Original Secession Church', and the son became a member of that church.

6. In 1852 some of the members of the United Original Secession Church, including the son, joined the Free Church of Scotland formed by the Disruption of 1843.

5. In 1856 the son became a professor in the Theological College of English Presbyterian Church.

6. The son resigned from that post in 1866.

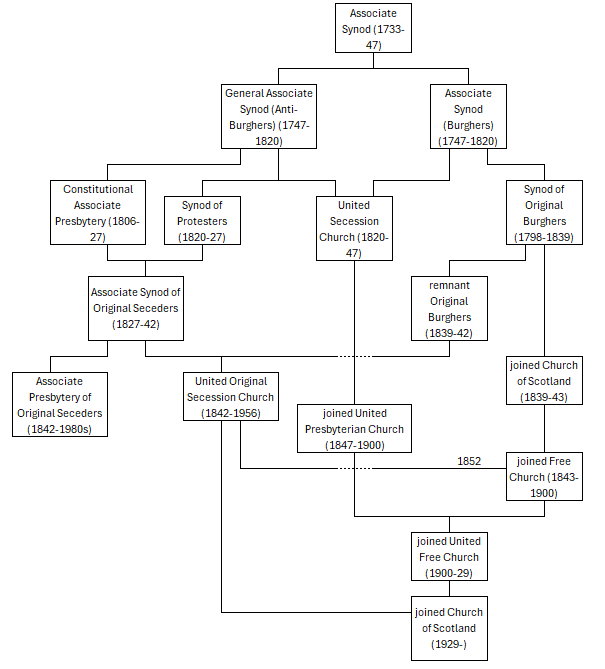
Secession church history

== Notable Anti-Burghers ==
(Other than the theological professors listed below)

- Adam Gib (died 1788, before the 'Auld Licht'/'New Licht' division)
- John Jamieson ('New Licht') (died 1838)
- Thomas M'Crie the elder ('Auld Licht') (died 1835)
- Thomas Mair (seceded 1737 and died 1768, before the 'Auld Licht'/'New Licht' division)

== Theological Professors ==
=== Before the 'Auld Licht'/'New Licht' division (1747–1806) ===
1. Alexander Moncrieff (one of the 1733 seceders) (1747–1761)

2. William Moncrieff (1761–1786)

3. Archibald Bruce (1786–1806)

=== New Light (1806–1820) ===
1. George Paxton (1807–1820)

=== Old Light (1806–1852) ===
1. Archibald Bruce (1806–1816)

2. George Paxton (Original Secession Church – 1827–1836)

3. Thomas M'Crie the Younger (Original Secession Church – 1836–1842) (United Original Secession Church – 1842–1852)

== See also ==
- John Simson

== Bibliography ==
- McKerrow, John (1839). "Controversy Respecting the Burgess-Oath". History of the Secession Church. Edinburgh: William Oliphant and Son. pp. 272–278.
- Scott, David (1886). Annals and statistics of the original Secession church: till its disruption and union with the Free church of Scotland in 1852. Edinburgh : A. Elliot. This article incorporates text from this source, which is in the public domain.
