= Old and New Lights =

Terms used to distinguish Christian groups

The terms Old Lights and New Lights typically refer to two factions within a Protestant denomination resulting from two different theological approaches to the Evangelical Revival. The terms originated in the early 18th century from a split among English-speaking Reformed Protestant denominations concerning the nature of conversion and salvation. Since then, they have been applied in a wide variety of ways, and the meaning must be determined from each context. Typically, the more traditional Protestants are called the "Old Lights," and the more emotional, pro-change Protestants are called the "New Lights".

== History ==
The terms were first used during the First Great Awakening (1730s–40s), which expanded through the British North American colonies in the middle of the 18th century. In A Faithful Narrative of the Surprising Work of God (1737), Jonathan Edwards, a leader in the Awakening, describes his congregants' vivid experiences with grace as causing a "new light" in their perspective on sin and atonement. Old Lights and New Lights generally referred to Congregationalists and Baptists in New England and Presbyterians in Pennsylvania and further south who took different positions on the Awakening from the traditional branches of their denominations.

New Lights embraced the revivals that spread through the colonies, while Old Lights were suspicious of the revivals (and their seeming threat to authority). Historian Richard Bushman credits the division between Old Lights and New Lights for the creation of political factionalism in Connecticut in the mid-18th century.

Often, many "new light" Congregationalists who had been converted under the preaching of George Whitefield left that connection to become "new light" Baptists when they found no evidence of infant baptism in the apostolic church. When told of this development, Whitefield famously quipped that he was glad to hear about the fervent faith of his followers but regretted that "so many of his chickens had become ducks." In the Presbyterian Church those elements embracing the revivals of the Great Awakening were sometimes called "New Side," and those opposed to the revivals were called "Old Side."

In the Church of Scotland Seceders in the 1790s, the "Old Lights" (Constitutional Associate Presbytery and Synod of Original Burghers) followed the principles of the Covenanters, and the "New Lights" (which united to form the United Secession Church in 1820) were more focused on personal salvation and considered the strictures of the Covenants as less binding moral enormities.

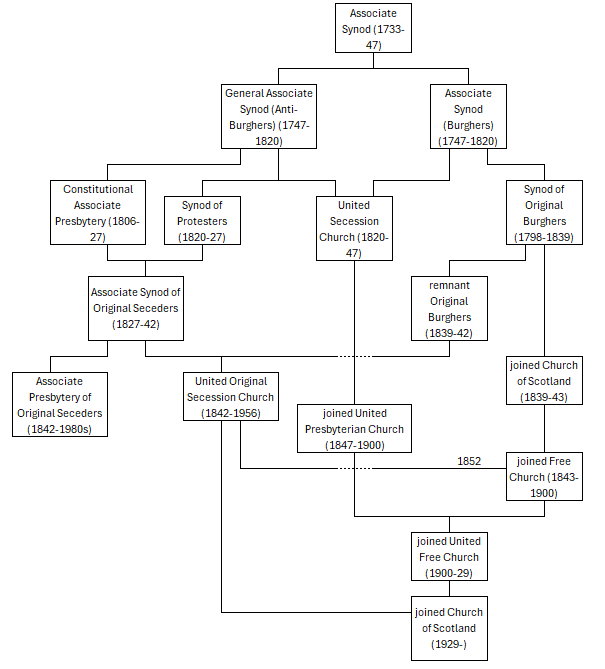
Secession church history

In Ireland, New lights formed the Remonstrant Synod of Ulster. The terms were also used in 1833, when a debate over swearing allegiance to the U.S. Constitution split the Reformed Presbyterians. The "Old Light" Reformed Presbyterians, in keeping with their Covenanter heritage, refused to swear allegiance to the Constitution and thus to become US citizens because the Constitution makes no mention of the Lordship of Christ, and the "New Light" Reformed Presbyterians allowed the swearing. After the split, the Old Lights eventually formed the Reformed Presbyterian Church of North America, and the New Lights formed the Reformed Presbyterian Church, General Synod.

== See also ==
- Anti-burgher movement in Scotland
- Friends of the Light, in Germany
- Old School–New School controversy, in the Americas
- Old Side–New Side controversy, in the Americas
