= St Andrew's Orthodox Church, Edinburgh =

St Andrew's Orthodox Church
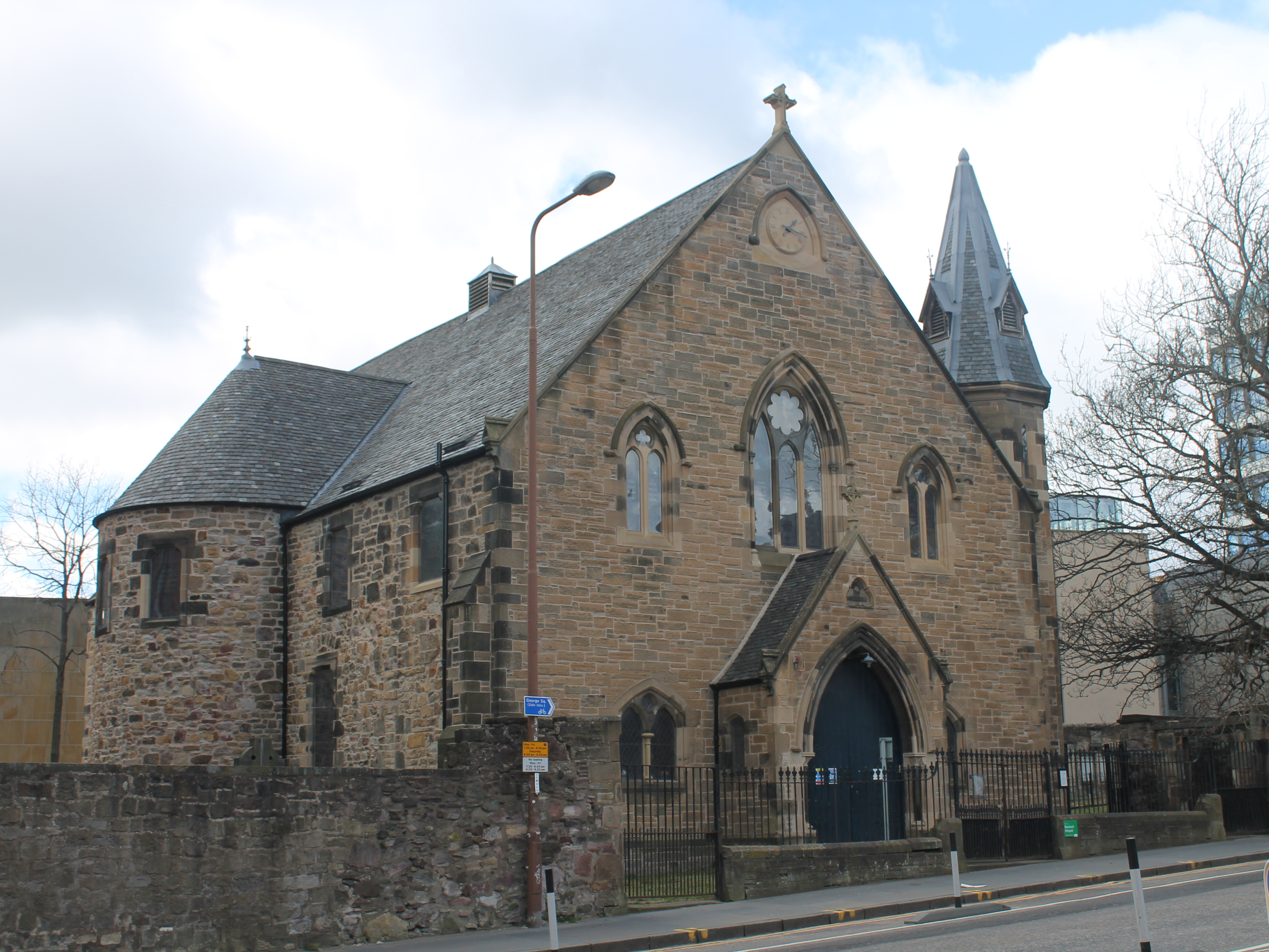
- St Andrew's Orthodox Church
- 55°56′37″N 3°11′07″W
- Location: Edinburgh
- Country: Scotland
- Language(s): English; Slavonic; Romanian; Greek
- Denomination: Greek Orthodox
- Previous denomination: Church of Scotland (1756–1969)

History
- Former name(s): St Cuthbert's Chapel of Ease (1756–1834); Buccleuch Parish Church (1834–1969)
- Dedication: Saint Andrew
- Events: 1969: Buccleuch Parish Church closed and building sold to University of Edinburgh; 2013: Building purchased by Orthodox Community of St Andrew

Architecture
- Functional status: Active
- Style: Scottish Vernacular; Gothic revival
- Groundbreaking: 1755
- Completed: 1756
- Construction cost: £642 (£120,700 in 2025)

Administration
- Archdiocese: Archdiocese of Thyateira and Great Britain

Clergy
- Priest(s): Very Rev. Archimandrite Hieromonk Avraamy Neyman; Rev. Presbyter Luke Jeffery

Listed Building – Category C(S)
- Official name: Chapel Street, Former Buccleuch Parish Church
- Designated: 10 October 2007
- Reference no.: LB26785

St Andrew's Orthodox Church is an Orthodox church located in the Southside, Edinburgh, Scotland. Edinburgh's Orthodox community was founded in 1948 and has, since 2013, occupied the former Buccleuch Parish Church, which was founded as a chapel of ease of St Cuthbert's in 1756 and closed in 1969.

In the middle of the 18th century, St Cuthbert's Parish covered a large area around Edinburgh. Its population was growing, especially in the area of the modern Southside. The church opened in January 1756 as St Cuthbert's Chapel of Ease. The church became a parish church in 1834 and founded a parish school on the Meadows in 1839. The Disruption of 1843 greatly affected the church and it was revived with the support of Archibald Charteris and the Edinburgh University Mission Association. By the middle of the 20th century, the congregation was declining as many of its members moved away from the Southside. In 1969, Buccleuch united with Nicolson Street and Charteris-Pleasance. The building was sold to the University of Edinburgh, which used it as a furniture store.

The Orthodox Community of St Andrew was founded in 1948 by Archpriest John Sotnikov, a Russian chaplain of the Polish Army. Under Sotnikov's successor, Maitland Moir, the church moved into the former Buccleuch Parish School in 2003 before purchasing the former Buccleuch Parish Church in 2013.

The church is a simple, cruciform building, greatly altered in the Gothic style by Daniel MacGibbon in 1866. It has been a category C listed building since 2007. Notable interments in the surrounding churchyard include Thomas Blacklock and Deacon Brodie.

== Buccleuch Parish Church ==
=== Foundation ===
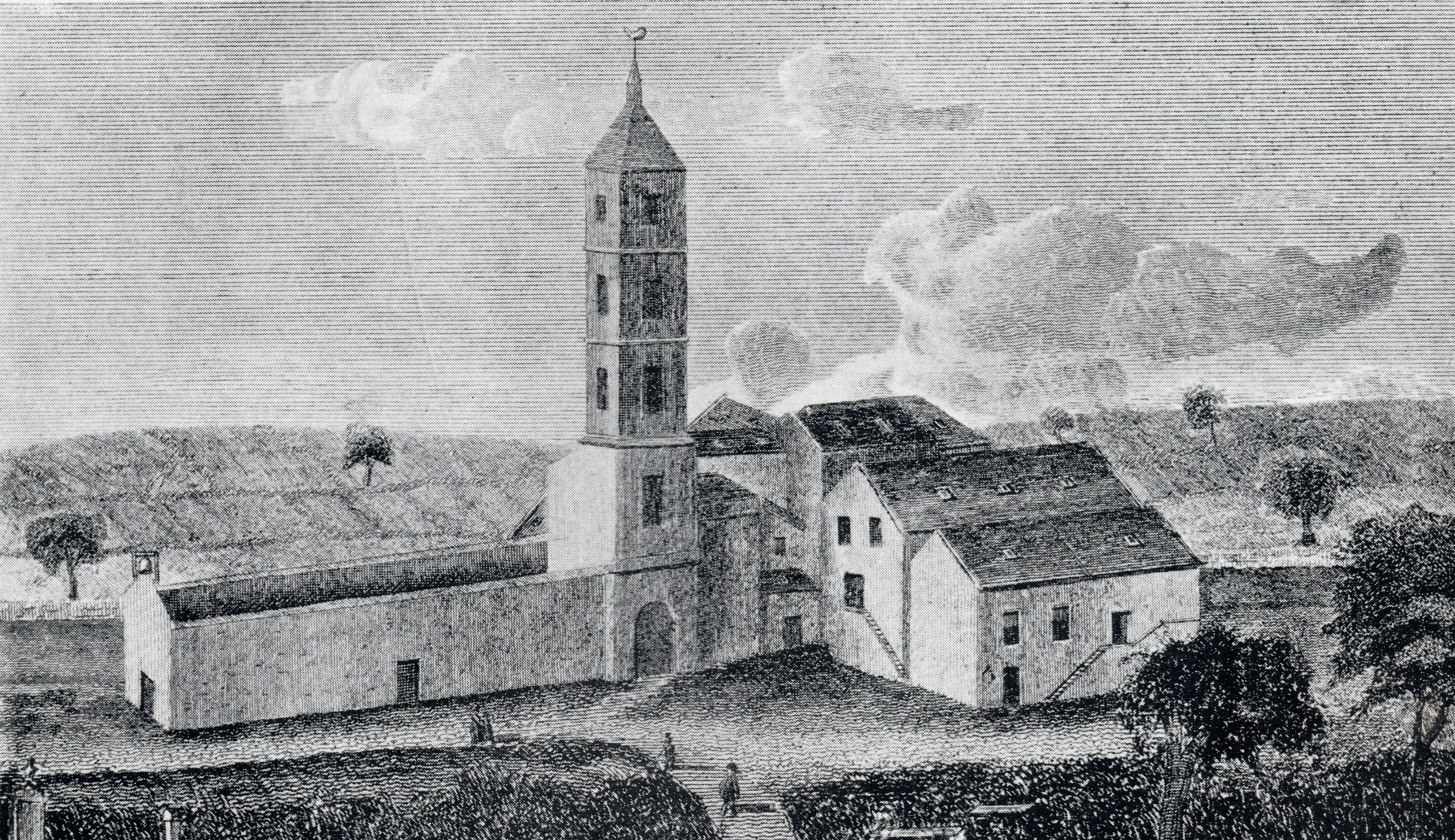
The West Kirk in the 18th century; the roofless remains of the Little Kirk are visible to the left of the tower

By the middle of the 18th century, the West Kirk Parish covered an area almost entirely surrounding the burgh of Edinburgh. The parish population had grown, especially in the area south of the Old Town now known as the Southside. To address this need, the West Kirk decided to erect a chapel of ease. To this end, the church issued subscription lists in 1754 and acquired a plot of land at the western end of Crosscauseway, near the eastern edge of the Boroughloch. To encourage subscriptions, everyone who subscribed £5 or more was offered the right to elect the church's minister.

The practice of erecting chapels of ease only became widespread in the Church of Scotland from later in the 18th century. The St Cuthbert's Chapel of Ease was one of the first such chapels in Scotland. Roy Pinkerton argues the established church's eagerness to build a place of worship in the vicinity was also partly motivated by the recent establishment of the Antiburgher meeting house nearby, on Quarry's Close. St Cuthbert's Chapel of Ease was built to accommodate 1,200 worshippers and construction was estimated at £642.

The West Kirk had earlier provided for the growth of its congregation with the construction of the Little or Wester Kirk as an extension to its existing buildings in 1593. This was, however, unroofed during Cromwell's occupation of Edinburgh from 1650. The exterior walls were repaired following the Revolution but a proposal of 1702 to restore the kirk entirely and provide it with its own minister was rejected by the presbytery. Around the same time, the Little Kirk began to be used as a burial enclosure. (Note: Both Hew Scott and Roy Pinkerton emphasises the lack of continuity between the Little Kirk and St Cuthbert's subsequent chapels of ease.)

=== Early years ===
The chapel opened for worship in January 1756. Initially, the ministers of the West Kirk took turns preaching in the new chapel; however, this soon proved too onerous and James Roy was appointed the congregation's first dedicated minister in 1758. At its opening, the church had been set in largely rural surroundings with only scattered housing. Soon, however, affluent residential developments such as George Square and Buccleuch Place were constructed nearby. The church thus attracted a well-to-do congregation, including many of the city's leading figures. During the incumbency of the second minister, John Touch, Lord Cockburn worshipped in the church.

At the time of Touch's departure in 1808, the congregation had declined and some in the West Kirk considered discontinuing the chapel. The ministers of the West Kirk, however, agreed to continue the chapel of ease's ministry themselves. Under Henry Moncrieff-Wellwood, the chapel's fortunes so reversed that, in 1810, a new aisle and gallery were added to the north of the church to accommodate the increased congregation. Moncrieff-Wellwood's work was continued by the appointment in 1813 of Henry Grey.

Grey was succeeded in 1821 by Robert Gordon, who, when he departed for the nearby Hope Park Chapel in 1824, was succeeded by Patrick Clason. In 1834, the General Assembly erected the chapel a parish quoad sacra with the name Buccleuch Parish Church. From the 1820s, the West Kirk began efforts to create a school for southern districts of the city. The Buccleuch Parish School opened in a building facing onto the Meadows in 1839.

=== Disruption ===
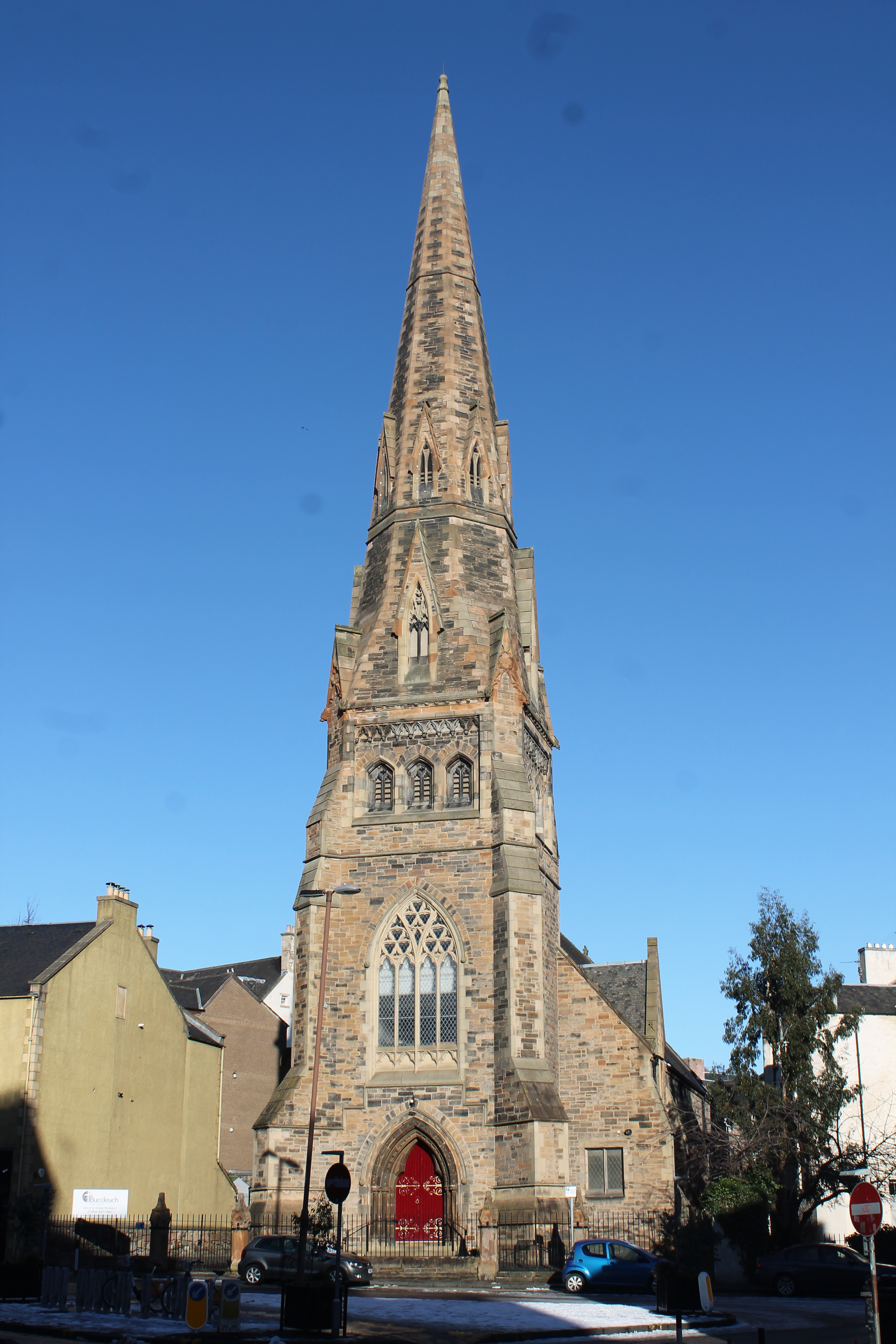
Buccleuch Free Church was founded by a significant portion of the congregation which left at the Disruption. Its building, opposite Buccleuch, remains in use as a Free Church

Grey, Gordon, and Clason would all become prominent figures in the Free Church and Clason led a significant portion of the Buccleuch congregation out of the established church at the Disruption of 1843. (Note: Buccleuch Free Church met in temporary accommodation on Buccleuch Place before moving to a purpose-built church opposite Buccleuch Parish Church in 1857. The congregation united with Greyfriars Free Church in 1897 and continued in the Free Church after most of the denomination united with the United Presbyterian Church to form the United Free Church of Scotland in 1900. The congregation continues in the Buccleuch Free building as Buccleuch and Greyfriars Free Church.)

The departure of most of the congregation cast doubt the Buccleuch's viability and, when the post-Disruption minister, Henry Rutherford, left in 1851, the church again faced a serious risk of closure. The church survived, however, thanks to the Edinburgh University Missionary Association, which used it as a base for home mission work. Led by Archibald Charteris, the association soon gathered a large and enthusiastic congregation and, by 1857, the church was again able to support a full-time minister. That year, Alexander McLaren became minister and, in 1859, the Court of Teinds raised the church to full status as a parish quoad sacra.

During the ministry of Finlay Mathieson from 1863 to 1875, the church was renovated in the Gothic style. A choir was established and a harmonium purchased. By the time of Mathieson's departure, the congregation had declined significantly to 254 and debts ran to £300. During the ministry of John Campbell between 1882 and 1901, the church was re-decorated and fitted with electric lighting. The first permanent pipe organ was installed in 1899.

=== 20th century ===
Campbell's successor, David Andrew Rollo, again secured the co-operation of the University Missionary Association and the congregation grew. By 1911, the church was able to support youth work, a Dorcas society, a foreign missionary association, and a missionary assistant within the parish. In 1928, the congregation's membership reached a peak of just over 2,000

By the middle of the 20th century, the Southside was beginning to experience population decline and many of the predominantly working-class congregation relocated to peripheral housing developments. The University of Edinburgh was also expanding in the Southside: a fact noted with concern by the church's session as early as 1947. By 1960, the congregation's membership had declined to 824.

In the 1950s, the halls were used by a mothers' welfare clinic and for performances of the Edinburgh University Dramatic Society during the Fringe. From 1963, Holy Week services were held by a local ecumenical council of churches. By this stage, Buccleuch shared its summer services with Newington and St Leonard's.

When the ministry of Buccleuch fell vacant in 1964, the congregation sought union with Nicolson Street but this was blocked by the presbytery. Another attempt at union between the two congregations in 1967 failed, as did ambitious plans the same year for a six-way union between Buccleuch, Charteris-Pleasance, Nicolson Street, Newington and St Leonard's, St Paul's Newington, and St Margaret's, Dumbiedykes. The following year, a five-way union, excluding St Paul's Newington also fell through. Eventually, a three-way union with Nicolson Street and Charteris-Pleasance was agreed and a service of union was held on 7 September 1969. The united congregation adopted the name Kirk o' Field and met in the Charteris-Pleasance buildings on the Pleasance. Buccleuch was sold to the University of Edinburgh, which afterwards used the building as a furniture store.

=== Ministers ===
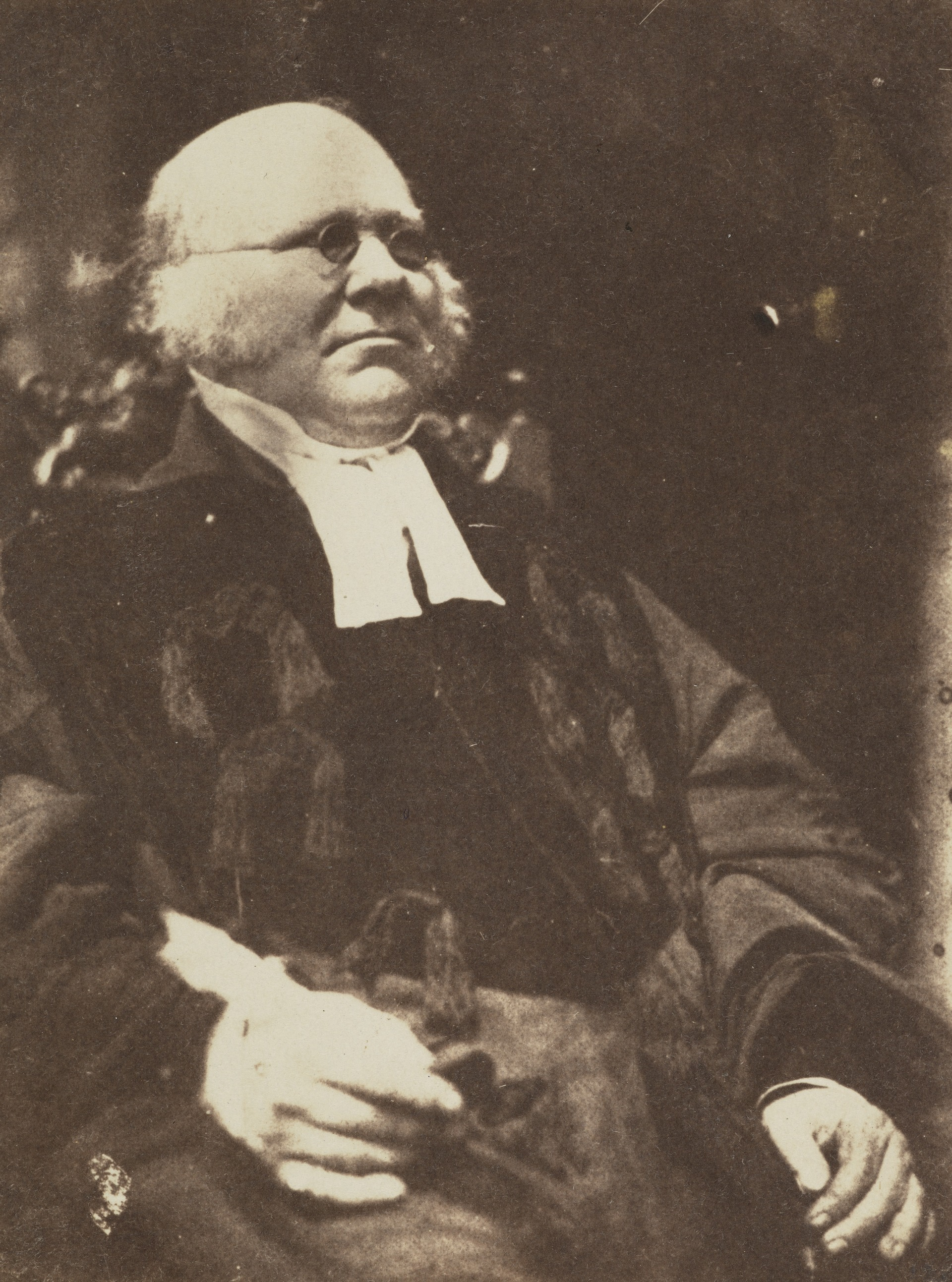
Patrick Clason: the church's minister at the time of the Disruption, in which he was a leading figure

The following ministers served St Cuthbert's Chapel of Ease (1756–1834) and Buccleuch Parish Church (1834–1969):

1758–1765 James Roy
1766–1808 John Touch
1813–1821 Henry Grey
1821–1824 Robert Gordon
1824–1843 Patrick Clason
1844–1851 Henry Rutherford
1857–1863 Alexander McLaren
1864–1875 Finlay Mathieson
1875–1881 John Young Scott
1882–1901 John Campbell
1901–1907 David Andrew Rollo
1908–1913 James Edward Houston
1913–1923 Neil MacLeod Ross
1924–1928 John Spence Ewen
1929–1964 William Gemmell Mitchell
1965–1968 James Sinclair Cormack

=== Plate ===
The church's earliest plate dates to its time as a chapel of ease of St Cuthbert's. A silver baptismal bowl and communion goblets are inscribed "The Property of the Chapel of Ease in the Parish of St Cuthbert's 1763". Each cup is numbered under its base. The accompanying pewter flagons were made by Richard Pitt of London.

Later plate includes replicas of the Georgian communion cups inscribed "Buccleuch Parish Church 1902" and a further two silver cups inscribed "Buccleuch Parish Church: presented by the Congregation as a memento of the occasion of the induction of the Rev. James E. Houston BD, 15 January 1908". A further two cups are inscribed "Buccleuch Parish Church. Presented by Mr and Mrs Alston, October 1926". William Alston was a long-serving treasurer of the church and, at his death two years later, six large, square, silver-plated salvers were added to the communion plate. These are inscribed: "Buccleuch Parish Church: presented by the Congregation in grateful remembrance of Mr Wm. Alston, Solicitor, Treasurer of the Church for 21½ years, who died 24th January 1928."

== St Andrew's Orthodox Church ==
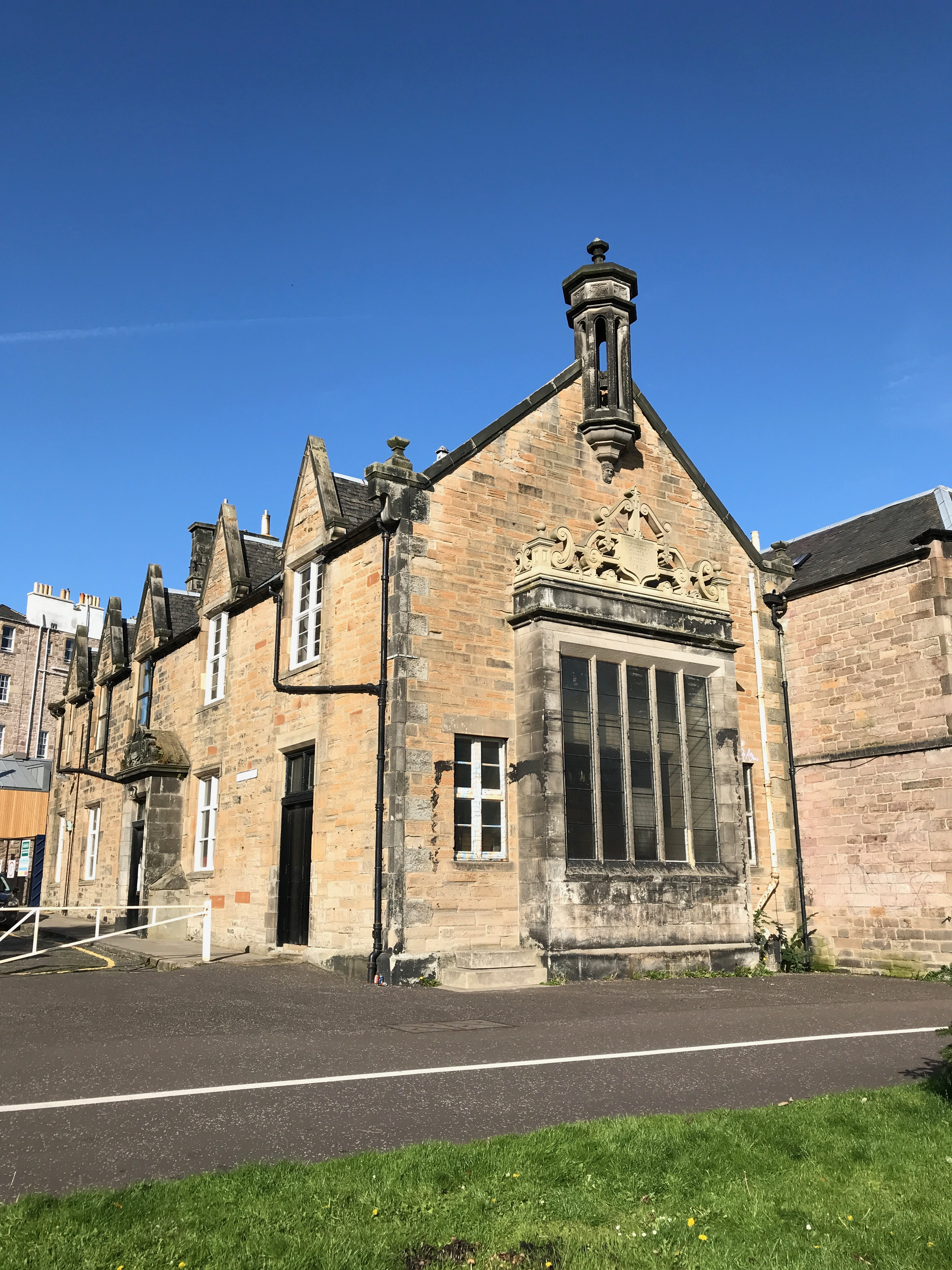
The former Buccleuch Parish School, opened in 1839 and purchased by the Orthodox Community of St Andrew in 2003

An Orthodox chaplaincy had been established in Edinburgh in 1948 by Archpriest John Sotnikov, a Russian chaplain of the Polish Army. Initially, most congregants were Polish ex-servicemen and worship was conducted in Slavonic. In 1984, Sotnikov was succeeded by Archimandrite John Maitland Moir: a Scottish convert from Episcopalianism to Orthodoxy, under whom English became the congregation's predominant language for worship.

In 2003, the congregation purchased the former Buccleuch Parish School buildings from the City of Edinburgh Council and vacated its George Square location. By 2012, average attendance had risen to 250. The congregation, having outgrown the former school buildings, put them up for sale the same year. The congregation thereafter secured use of the former Buccleuch Parish Church, completing the purchase on 17 April 2013: the day of Moir's death at the age of 88.

Since its foundation, the congregation has been part of the Archdiocese of Thyateira. Worship is chiefly in English but the church also holds Greek, Slavonic, and Romanian services.

== Building ==
=== Description ===
The church is the oldest extant religious building in Edinburgh's Southside. As it now appears, the building is a plain, Gothic structure with a cruciform plan. In the north-east corner, there is a short tower with a diminutive lucarned spire. The exterior stonework is snecked rubble with ashlar dressings in the façade with random rubble on the other walls.

The façade – or east elevation – is symmetrical, with a small porch flanked by two-light windows. There is a trefoil datestone within the pinnacle of the porch's gable. The stone reads: "ERECTED 1755: RESTORED 1866". Above this are three pointed windows beneath a clock in the pinnacle of the gable. The south elevation is distinguished by a central bowed bay with finial, which parallels a square-ended bay with gable and ball finial on the north side.

The interior remains subdivided into two floors while retaining many original fittings. These include the pulpit, organ loft, and galleries as well as the timber and part-glazed screens to the narthex. These screens have Art Nouveau door handles and stained-glass panels.

=== Architectural history ===
At its construction in 1755, the building was a plain, vernacular building. Writing soon after its completion, Hugo Arnot hailed the church as "a plain genteel building". James Grant, however, writing in 1880, described the church as "a hideous and unpretending structure" prior to its 1866 renovation. In 1763, a three-stage bell tower with belfry, spire, and vane was added to the middle of the east gable. A bell from St Cuthbert's was installed in here 1791. The bell, about 2ft in diameter, was founded by John Meikle in 1700 and bore his name along with the inscription: "For the West Kirk, 1700". (Note: The second edition of the Fasti Ecclesiae Scoticanae, published in 1915, claims this bell was replaced at the renovation in 1866; though James Grant, writing in 1880, and William Pitcairn Anderson, writing in 1931, both claim it was still in use.) The congregation had originally sought to procure the bell of the recently demolished Netherbow Port.

Below the bell tower stood a porch, which was itself built into the boundary wall, allowing direct access to the street. Gates in the boundary wall on either side of the front porch gave access the kirkyard. A new aisle and gallery were added to the north side of the church in 1810.

The church was renovated in 1866 by David MacGibbon. The building was refaced in the Gothic style: a clock was set in the east wall and the tower was removed and replaced by a short spire on the north side. Originally, the spire included a tall pinnacle but this was removed in the early 20th century. An apse-like bowed aisle was also added to the south side of the church. A scheme of stained glass was installed, including a window gifted by the Marquess of Bute in memory of one of his ancestors, Flora Mure Campbell, who is buried in the adjoining kirkyard. The north window is a memorial to Alexander Adam, who is also buried within the kirkyard. A two-manual organ by Eustace Ingram was added in 1899. After the church's initial secularisation, the interior was partitioned into two storeys. The building was designated a category C listed building on 10 October 2007.

The church once possessed two 14ft-tall black boards from the late 18th century, which display the Lord's Prayer, Creed, and Ten Commandments in gold lettering. These may have come from St Cuthbert's or from the Court of Session. In 1950, the boards were gifted to the nearby Newington and St Leonard's Parish Church (now the Queen's Hall), where they remain.

== Buccleuch Kirkyard ==
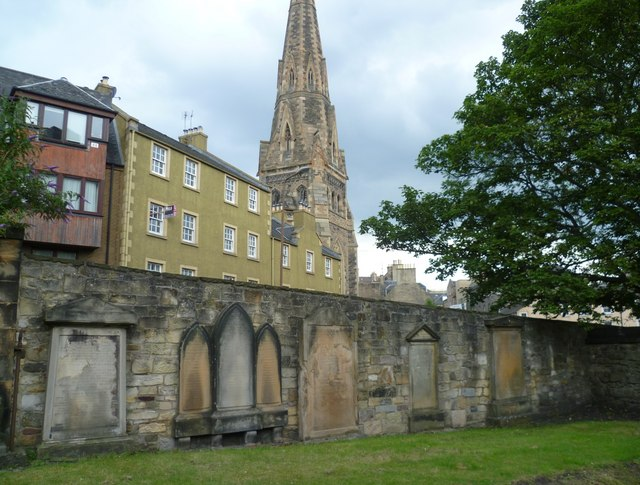
The east wall of the kirkyard

The grounds were opened for burials in June 1763. On 25 June the following year, William Falconer, an Episcopal bishop, consecrated the kirkyard in the presence of five elders and one deacon of the West Kirk. The elders who had requested this irregular ceremony were reprimanded by the Presbytery of Edinburgh. The lands of the kirkyard were not formally granted to the West Kirk by the town council until 1768.

Included in the grounds was site of a windmill, which had pumped water from the Boroughloch to the town for use by brewers. The windmill was demolished around the time the chapel was built but gave its name to Windmill Street and Windmill Lane, which border the churchyard.

Burials in the churchyard include the physician Andrew Duncan; the anthologist David Herd; the educator Alexander Adam; the ministers Robert Hamilton and James Baine; and the poet and minister Thomas Blacklock. Cabinet maker and criminal Deacon Brodie is buried against the north wall. A plaque on the external wall of the kirkyard at Chapel Street commemorates the interment within Buccleuch Kirkyard of Alison Cockburn, who wrote the lyrics to Flowers of the Forest. Charles Darwin, the uncle of Charles Darwin, is also buried in the kirkyard.

By 1820, the kirkyard had become overcrowded and no new lairs were made available. Instead, St Cuthbert's Parish that year opened the East Preston Street Burial Ground in Newington. In 1904, the congregation purchased a large corrugated iron hall from Glasgow and erected it in the kirkyard. This necessitated the removal of all monuments from the centre of the kirkyard and their reinstatement against the boundary wall. Soon after the hall's opening, the Buccleuch session considered letting it out for the contemporary fad of roller skating. The idea that youths would roller skate over the dead proved controversial. Reaction against the proposals soon spilled into the letters sections of the local press and the session quickly abandoned the idea.
