= David Williamson (minister) =

Scottish minister and moderator

- Portrait of Williamson by John Baptist Medina

Personal details
- Born: 1634 St Andrews, Scotland
- Died: 6 August 1706 (aged 71–72)
- Denomination: Presbyterian

David Williamson (c. 1634 (Note: Although the modern marker on Williamson's grave gives his date of birth as 1636 – the date of his baptism – the Fasti Ecclesiae Scoticanae states Williamson died in 1706 around the age of 72.)–6 August 1706) was a Scottish minister and Covenanter who served as moderator of the General Assembly of the Church of Scotland in 1702. He is notable for his long association with Edinburgh's West Kirk, his seven marriages, and his portrayal in the traditional song "Dainty Davie".

His support for the Covenanters led to his ousting in 1665 and his denouncement as a rebel in 1674. During his time as an outlaw, he escaped capture many times, most notably by hiding in bed with Jean Kerr of Cherrytrees, who became the third of his seven wives. This event is commemorated in the traditional song "Dainty Davie". Williamson also served as a commander in the Battle of Bothwell Bridge. Williamson returned to the West Kirk at the Revolution and remained until his death in 1706.

== Life ==
=== Early life ===
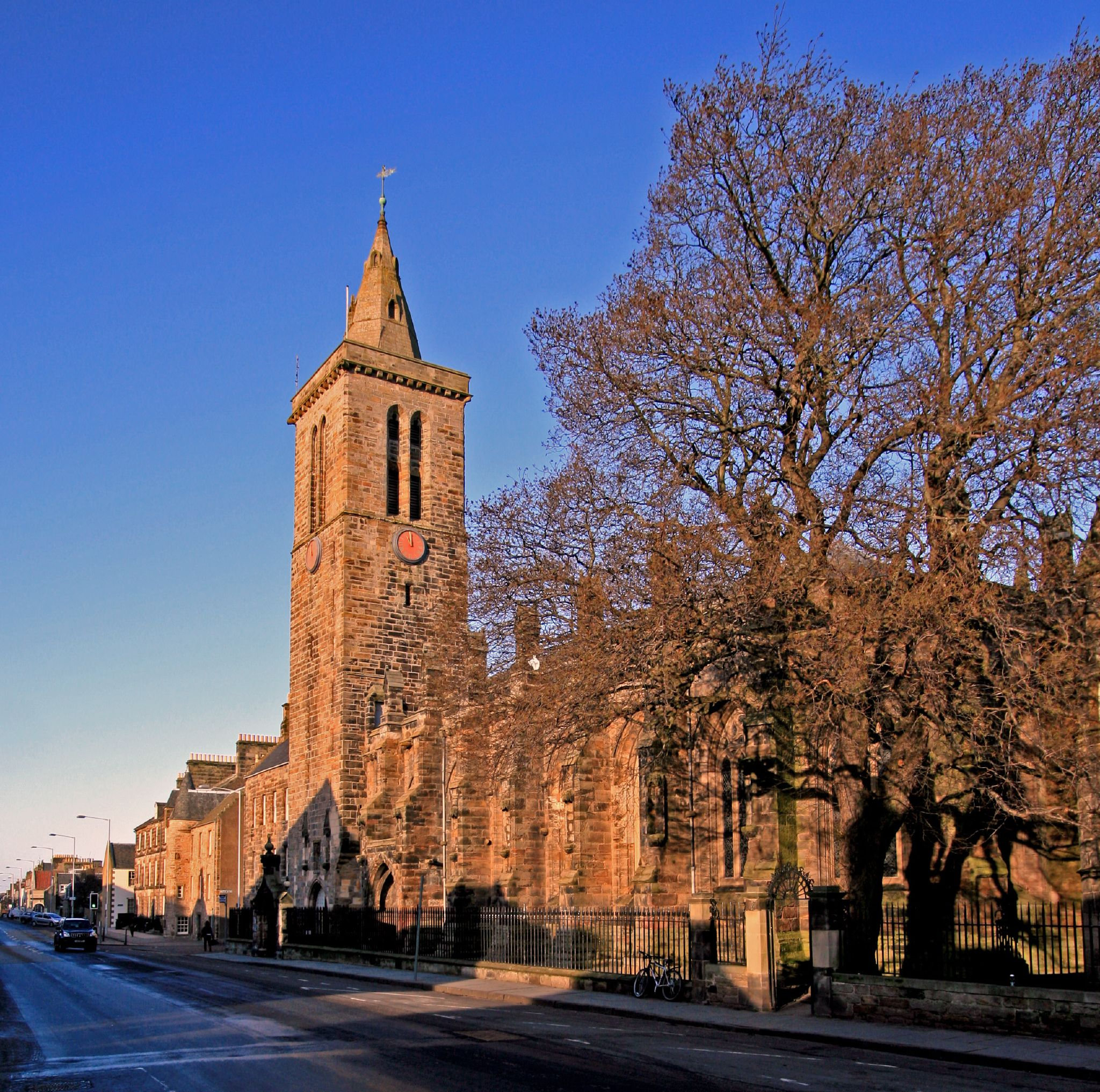
St Andrews, where Williamson was born and from whose university he graduated in 1655

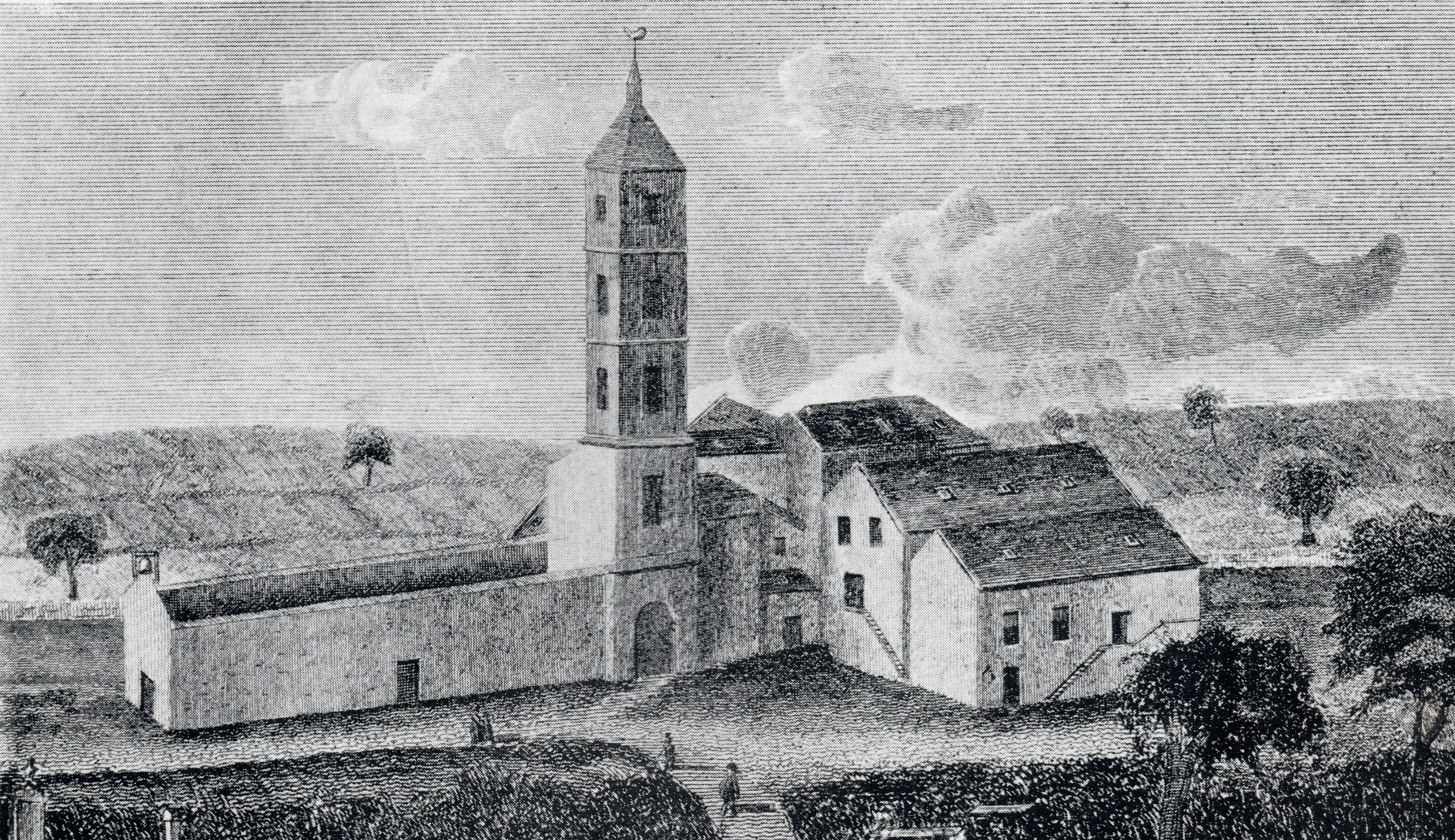
The West Kirk as it appeared in Williamson's time

Williamson was born in St Andrews to William Williamson, a glover. He was baptised on 2 September 1636. He was educated locally and then studied at the University of St Andrews with an MA in 1655. He was licensed to preach by the Presbytery of St Andrews on 23 June 1658 and became helper to Alexander Balfour, minister of Abdie in 1659.

On 13 July 1661, Williamson was presented by Charles II to the collegiate charge of the West Kirk of Edinburgh and ordained on 30 November that year. Williamson refused the imposition of episcopacy within the Church of Scotland and, the following year, acts of Parliament and the Privy Council deprived him of his charge. Williamson, however, remained in position until 13 April 1665, when his outspokenness against his newly installed pro-episcopal colleague, William Gordon, occasioned his removal. During his farewell sermon, Williamson prophesied: "I will return and die minister of this kirk".

=== Outlaw ===
There is little record of Williamson's activity until 6 July 1674, when he was denounced as a rebel for having held conventicles. In the following years, Williamson survived many narrow escapes from the law, including the incident memorialised in the song "Dainty Davie". In 1679, Williamson commanded a portion of the Covenanter army at the Battle of Bothwell Bridge. After Williamson's death, his son, John, related his father's escapades to Robert Wodrow. In George Lorimer's summary, Wodrow portrays Williamson as "a lonely hunted wanderer, glad of the shelter of a feal dyke behind which to lie down and rest himself amid the snow".

After the Indulgence of 1687 granted freedom to some Presbyterian clergy, Williamson returned to Edinburgh and ministered alongside James Reid in a newly erected meeting house in the Dean. Here Williamson developed a substantial congregation. Williamson's name was discovered on a memorandum belonging to James Renwick and, on 3 February 1688, Williamson was arrested and released a fortnight later. Soon afterwards, he was again arrested on a charge of failing to pray for the newly born Prince of Wales. Nothing, however, came of the charge.

=== Return to the West Kirk ===
In the wake of the Revolution, the General Assembly of 1690 restored Williamson to the West Kirk. In line with his earlier prophecy, Williamson ministered in the charge until the day of his death. Williamson served as one of the commissioners sent by the Church of Scotland to congratulate William II on his accession. Williamson was elected to the General Assembly of 1692 and served as the Assembly's moderator in 1702. In later life, Williamson invested £100 in the Darien scheme. He died "without painful sickness, generally esteemed" on 6 August 1706 at the age of around 72. He bequeathed a manse to his successors.

During his lifetime Williamson published individual sermons in 1696 and 1703.

== Family ==
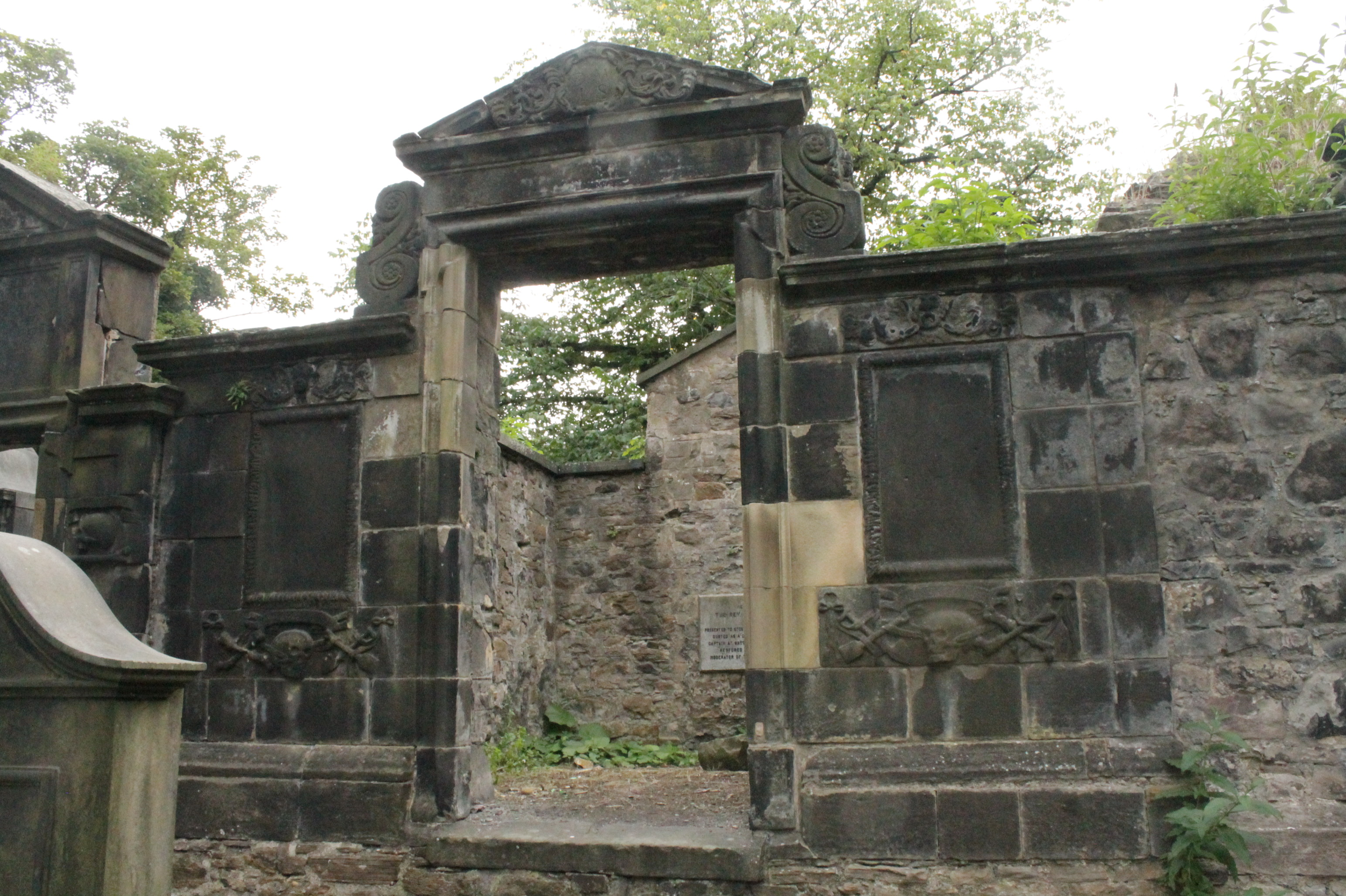
Rev David Williamson's vault, St Cuthbert's Churchyard

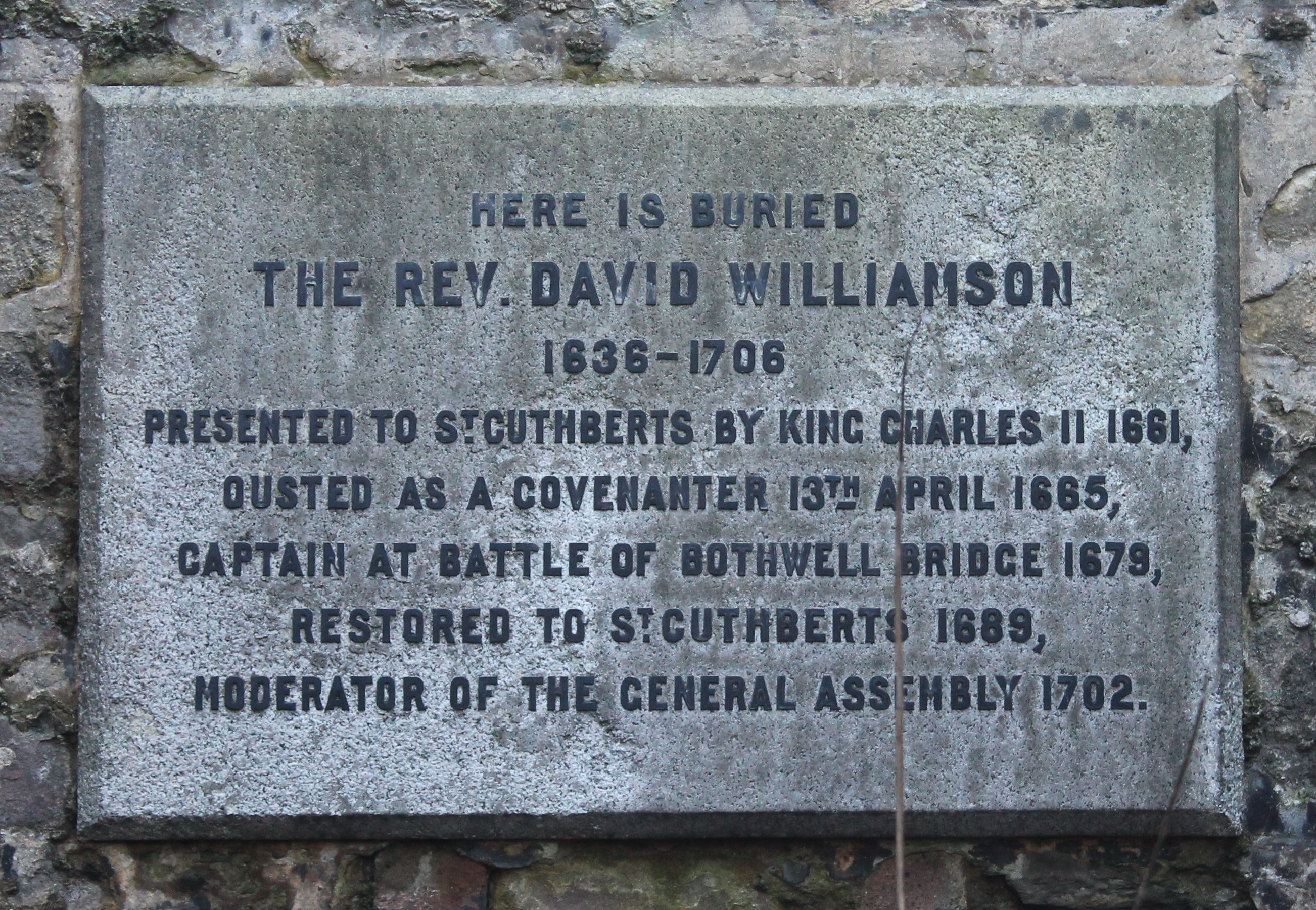
The marker over Williamson's grave was installed around the turn of the 20th century by an anonymous descendant.

Williamson is notable for his seven marriages. His wives and issue are as follows:

- Isobel Lindsay, who died in March 1665. Lindsay bore one son, William, who died young.
- Margaret Scott, who gave birth to a daughter, Margaret. Margaret married James Haswell, a merchant of Jedburgh.
- Jean, daughter of William Kerr of Cherrytrees, whom Williamson married around 1676. The marriage produced a daughter, Elizabeth, who married John Brown, minister of Abercorn in 1704. The circumstances of Jean and Williamson's meeting are alluded to in the lyrics of Dainty Davie.
- Margaret Melville, (Note: George Lorimer and William Pitcairn Anderson give her name as "Margaret Melwing".) servant of the Countess of Wemyss, who died in October 1692 and who probably gave birth to a son, John, who served as minister of Inveresk, and a daughter, Agnes, who married Henry Robin, minister of Burntisland in April 1708.
- Margaret, second daughter of William Dougal, a merchant of Dysart, who gave birth to a son, David, who was apprenticed to a surgeon of Edinburgh in 1713, and a daughter, Mary, who married George Andrews, merchant of Edinburgh, on 1 February 1716.
- A wife whose name is not known.
- Jean, daughter of Arthur Straiton of Kirkside, Forfarshire, whom Williamson married on 10 May 1700. The marriage produced a son, Joseph, who became an advocate and died on 29 July 1795 aged 95, and a daughter, Jean, who married James Steele, a saddler of Edinburgh, on 5 April 1730. After Williamson's death, Jean married John Martine of Little Aries, Wigtownshire in 1717.

At his death, Williamson was buried within an enclosure on the Knowe, the area of high ground south west of the church. As had been his wish, this site of his grave was near that of his predecessor Robert Pont. His family erected no memorial inside the vault, which was then normal with enclosed vaults. Around the turn of the 20th century, a memorial plaque was installed by an anonymous descendant, whom William Pitcairn Anderson speculates to be Williamson's successor Andrew Wallace Williamson.

== "Dainty Davie" ==
An event of Williamson's time as an outlaw is commemorated in the traditional Scottish song "Dainty Davie". The event to which the song refers was recorded in the memoirs of Captain Creighton. Creighton, recently appointed to the Guards, was sent to find Williamson in the house of Lady Cherrytrees near Edinburgh. Lady Cherrytrees, having received advance notice of the troopers' coming, dressed Williamson in women's clothes and hid him in bed with her daughter, Jean, who feigned illness on the troopers' arrival. Jean soon after became Williamson's third wife.

The connection between Williamson and the song is evinced within his lifetime. Robert Wodrow relates a story in which Williamson, going to preach in Aberdeen one Sunday, was hounded by a man who danced and sang "Dainty Davie". According to Wodrow, Williamson was grieved by the man's profanation of the Sabbath and, turning to one of his companions, said: "Alas for that poor man! He is now rejecting the last offer he is ever to have of Christ." The man died suddenly that night.

Williamson also had a reputation for being "dainty" in his appearance and habits. Williamson's appearance at the court of William and Mary excited the interest of the Queen's ladies in waiting. Hew Scott also records Williamson to have been the first clergyman in Scotland to own a watch. (Note: George Lorimer doubts this, pointing out that John Livingstone (died 1672) refers to his watch.) Williamson's reputation as a bon vivant is evinced by the discovery in the late 19th century of a receipt to the West Kirk's session for a plate of mince pies for Christmas 1690.

== See also ==
- List of moderators of the General Assembly of the Church of Scotland
