= Helen Alexander =

Helen Alexander (1654 – March 1729) was a heroine of the Scottish Covenanters in the unequal struggle between the adherents of ancient Presbyterianism and prelacy. She is still today a "household name" in the west of Scotland; in the mountain glens and moors of Ayrshire and Galloway and the Pentlands, chapbooks still tell her marvellous story of courage and devoutness.

== Biography ==
Helen Alexander was born at West Linton in 1654, and from her youth up was an earnest Christian. She was a staunch Presbyterian. She "ministered" dauntlessly to the fugitives. She stood by the friendless at the bars. She spent days and nights in prison with "the suffering remnant". She died in March 1729, aged 75.

Towards the end of her life she dictated many of her experiences to her husband, and the manuscript was published by the Rev. Dr. Robert Simpson, of Sanquhar, in his Voice from the Desert, or the Church in the Wilderness (1856). It is entitled A Short Account of the Lord's Dealing with Helen Alexander, spouse first to Charles Umpherston, tenant in Pentland, and thereafter to James Currie, merchant in Pentland; together with some remarkable passages, providential occurrences, and her support and comfort under them, and deliverance out of them. All collected from her own mouth by her surviving husband. It is scarcely possible to imagine a more artless or a more absolutely truthful narrative of the events of "The Killing Time", as it is still called in Scotland. All the leading Covenanters cross and recross the stage; for in and out of prison Helen Alexander was brought into the closest relations with them all, especially John Welsh, Donald Cargill, David Williamson, Andrew Gullon and James Renwick. Of the last she writes:

In the year 1683 the reverend and worthy Mr. James Renwick came home from Holland, an ordained minister. At first I scrupled to hear him, because it was said he was ordained by such as used the organ in their worship. But being better informed by himself, according as it is recorded in his Life and Death, printed some years ago, I heard him with all freedom, and to my great satisfaction, at Woodhouselee old house, being called there by friends about Edinburgh and Pentland. After this he frequented my house, with several worthy christians, even in the very heat of persecution; and I judged it my duty, in all these hazards, to attend the ordinances administered by him.

And this:

In the year 1687, November 30, I was again married unto James Currie, by the renowned Mr. James Renwick… Some months after this, Mr. Renwick being taken, I went and saw him in prison… And when he was executed, I went along to the Greyfriars' churchyard, took him in my arms until stripped of his clothes, helped to wind him in his graveclothes, and helped to put him into the coffin. This was a most shocking and sinking dispensation, more piercing, wounding, and afflicting than almost any before it.

There are many similar reports of those killed in the Scottish persecution.
