= Thomas Blacklock =

Scottish writer

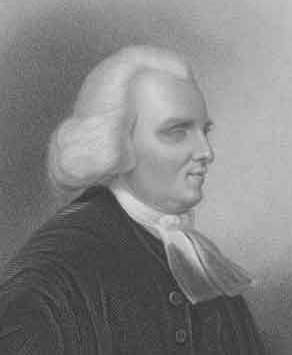
- Born: 10 November 1721; Annan, Dumfries and Galloway
- Died: 7 July 1791 (aged 69); Edinburgh, Scotland

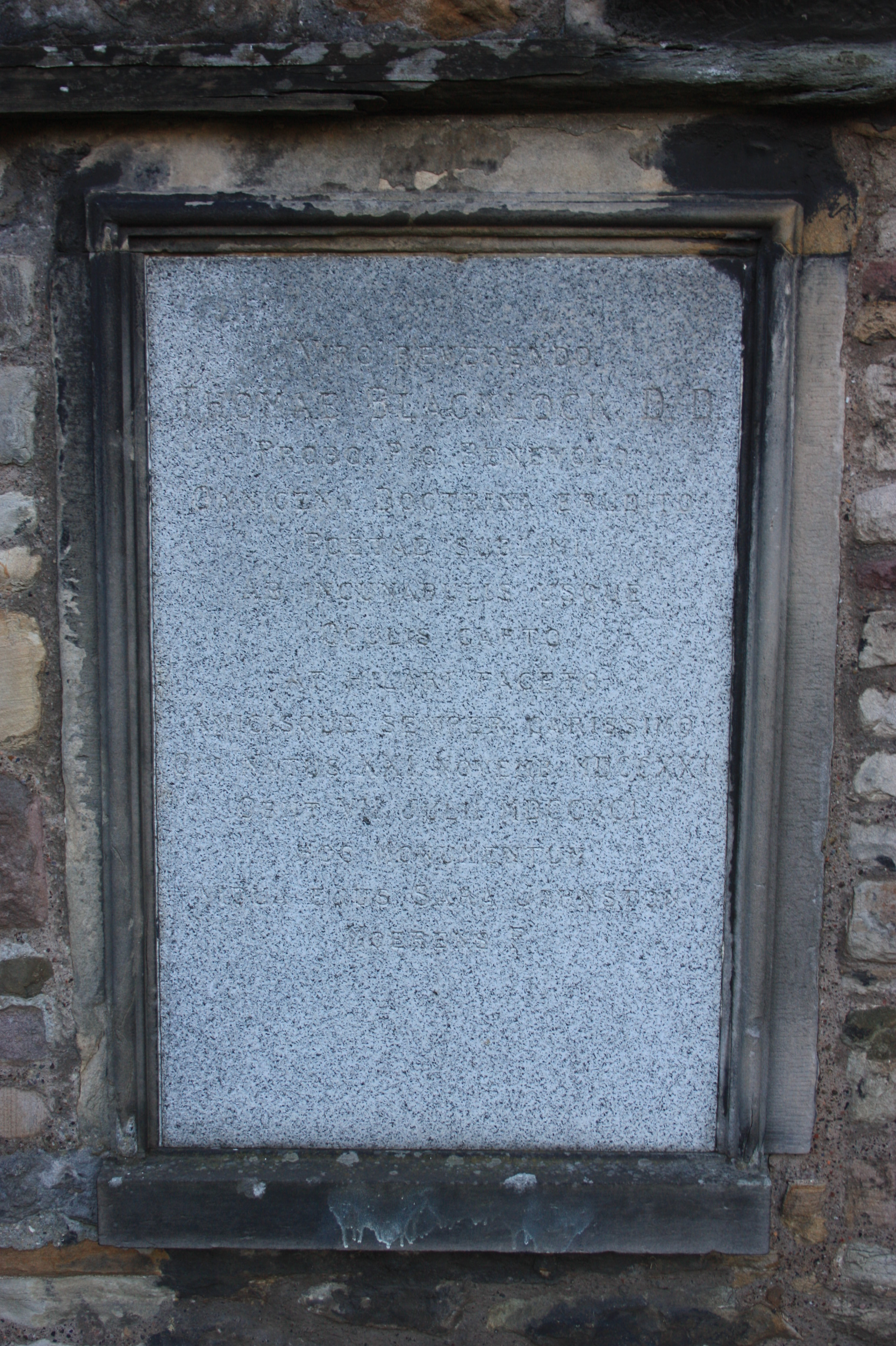
The grave of Blacklock, Buccleuch Street

Thomas Blacklock (10 November 1721 – 7 July 1791) was a Scottish poet who went blind in infancy.

== Life ==
He was born near Annan, Dumfriesshire (now Dumfries and Galloway), of humble parentage, and lost his sight as a result of smallpox when six months old. He began to write poetry at the age of 12, and studied for the Church. He was appointed minister of Kirkcudbright, but was objected to by the parishioners on account of his blindness, and gave up the presentation on receiving an annuity.

During the 1750s he was sponsored by the empiricist philosopher David Hume.

He then retired to Edinburgh, where he took in boarders and became a tutor, with considerable success. He studied divinity and was made D.D. in 1767 from the Marischal College (later part of the University of Aberdeen).

He published miscellaneous poems, some of which are preserved in the "Village Hymns for Social Worship" written by Asahel Nettleton and published in 1826. He is chiefly remembered for having written a letter in 1789 to Robert Burns, which dissuaded him from going to the West Indies, indirectly saving his life since the ship sank on the voyage.

The building in which he lived (at the corner Chapel Street and West Nicolson) now contains two pubs: Peartree House and The Blind Poet (the walls of which are decorated with a number of Blacklock's poems).

== Freemasonry ==
He was Initiated into Scottish Freemasonry in Journeymen Lodge of Dumfries, No.62, in 1754. The Lodge was renamed Thistle in 1803. Soon after moving to Edinburgh he Affiliated to Holyrood House (St. Luke's), No.44, (Edinburgh), formally doing so on 18 April 1766. His Masonic relationship with his friend and fellow Freemason, Robert Burns, has been mentioned elsewhere but remains to be fully explored.

== Death ==
He died at his home in Crichton Street (off Chapel Street), Edinburgh, and was buried in the adjacent churchyard of St. Cuthbert's Chapel of Ease on Buccleuch Street. The grave lies on the west wall slightly to the north-west of the church.

== See also ==
- List of 18th-century British working-class writers
