= Patrick Clason =

Scottish minister

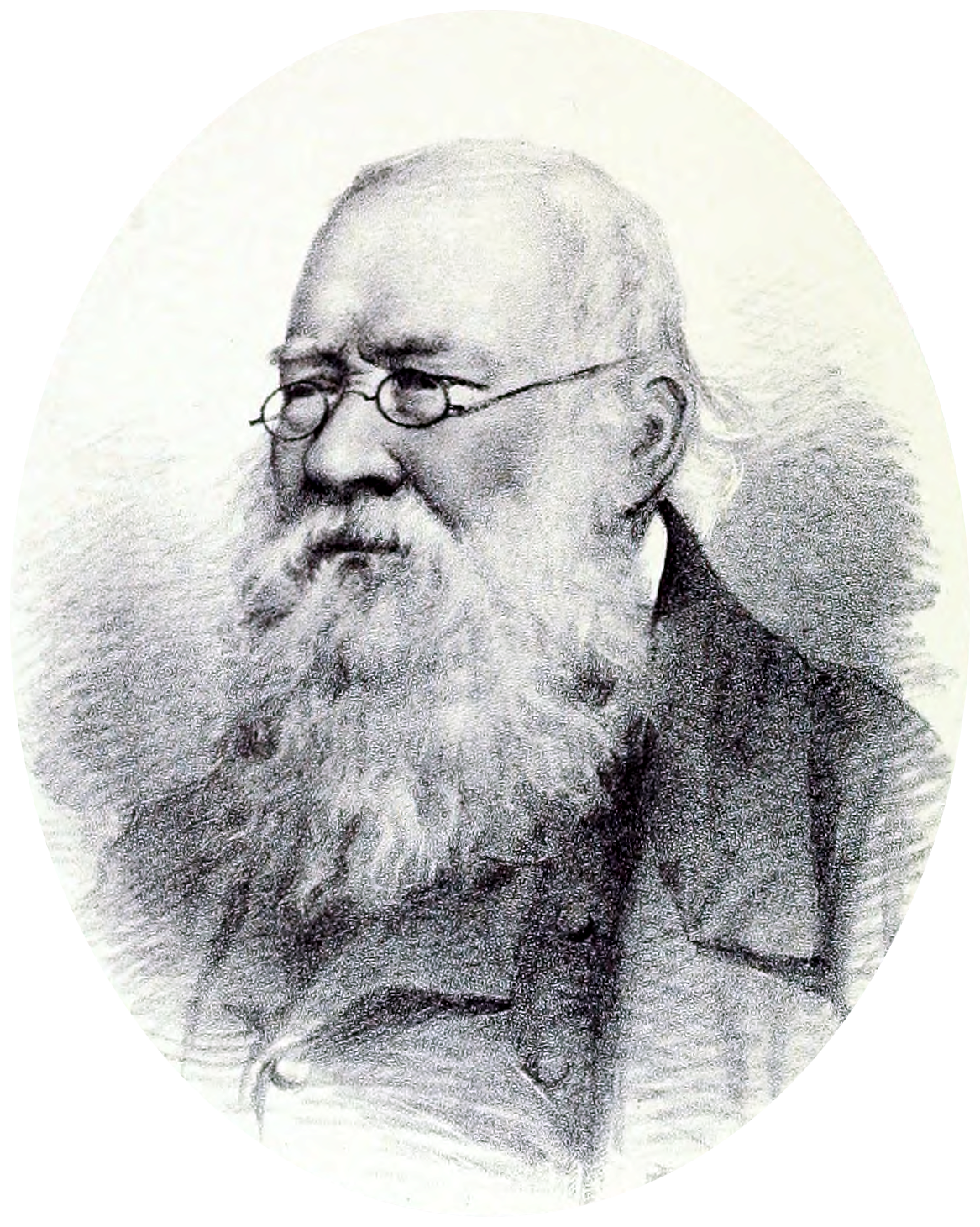
- Patrick Clason from Disruption Worthies
- Church: Buccleuch's Free Church
- Successor: Robert Gordon
- Previous post: Buccleuch Parish Church (1824-1843)

Orders
- Ordination: 11 May 1815

Personal details
- Born: 13 October 1789 Dalziel
- Died: 30 July 1867 (aged 77) Edinburgh
- Denomination: Free Church of Scotland
- Education: University of Glasgow, University of Edinburgh

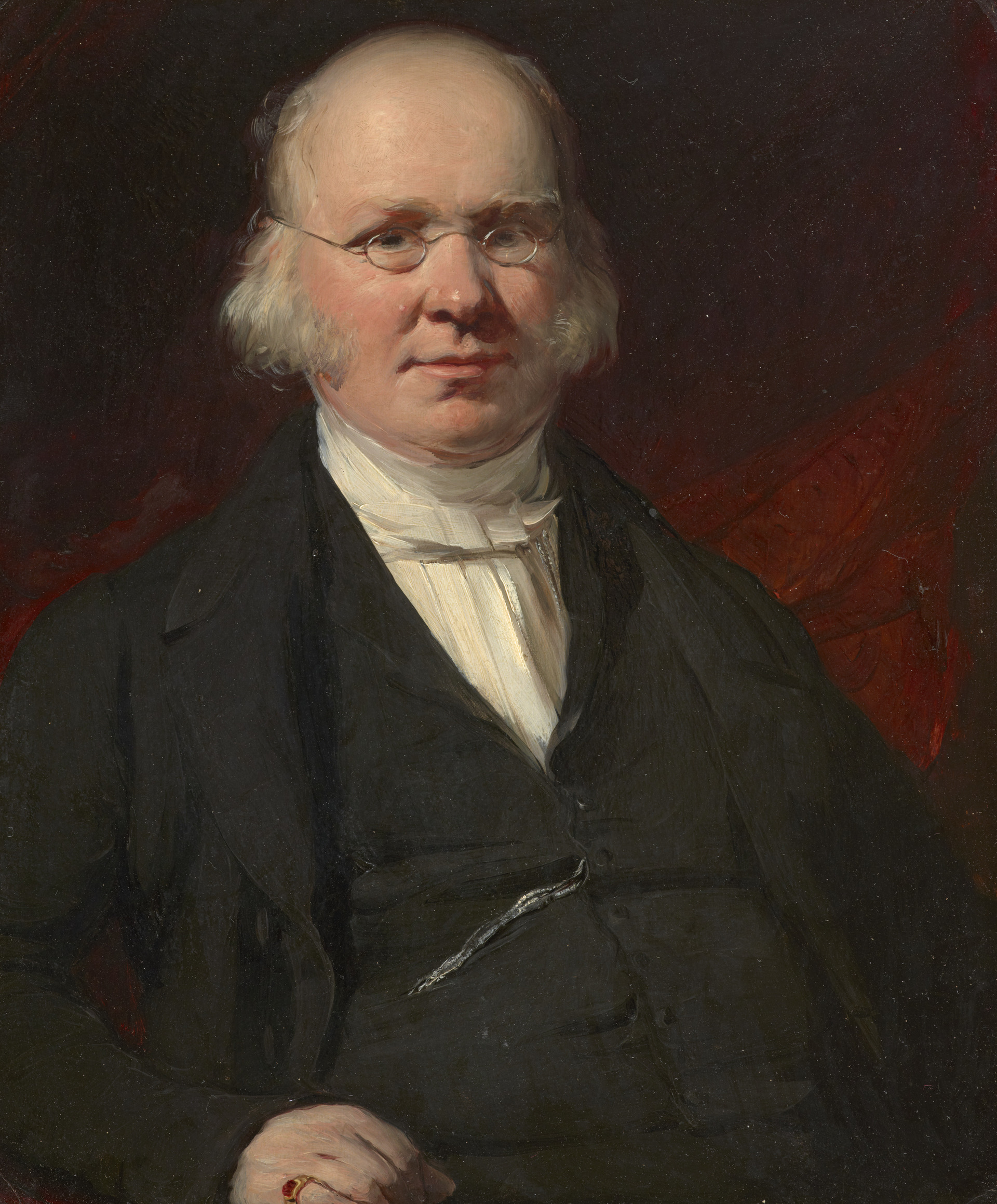
Patrick Clason

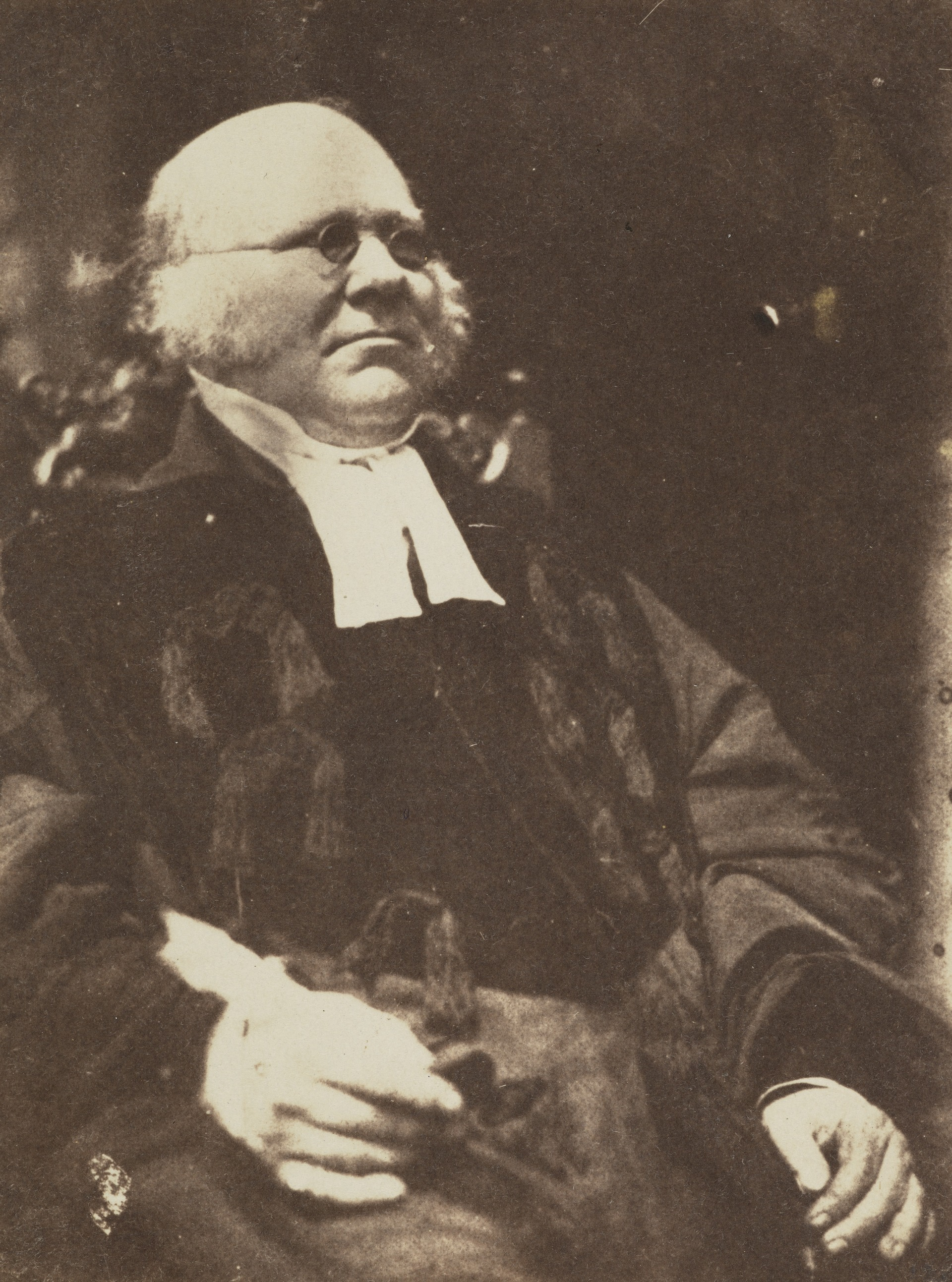
Patrick Clason - Buccleuch Free Church

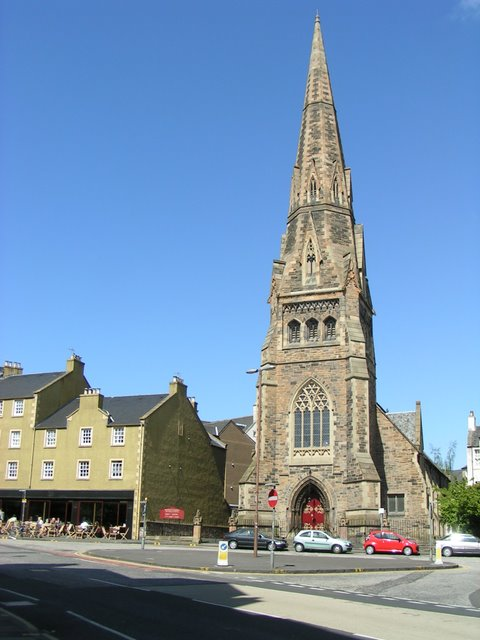
Buccleuch and Greyfriars Free Church

Patrick Clason (13 October 1789 – 30 July 1867) was a Scottish minister who served as Moderator of the General Assembly to the Free Church of Scotland in 1848/49.

== Life ==
He was born on 13 October 1789 in the manse at Dalziel near the River Clyde, the youngest son of Robert Clason. The family moved to Logie Kirk near Stirling in his youth. He studied divinity at the University of Glasgow then completed his studies at the University of Edinburgh and was licensed to preach by the Church of Scotland in 1811.

In 1815 Lady Stuart of Castlemilk presented him (as his patron) to the parish of Carmunnock.

In 1824 moved to Edinburgh as minister of St Cuthbert's Chapel of Ease, which was elevated to a quoad sacra parish church in 1834 and thereafter known as Buccleuch Parish Church.

In 1827 his house was burgled by William Law, blacksmith in Edinburgh. Two table cloths were stolen. Law was sentenced to be transported to Australia for 14 years.

In 1830 he stood unsuccessfully for the chair in Divinity at the University of St Andrews.

At the Disruption of 1843 Clason joined the Free Church of Scotland. He served as its Clerk (alongside Thomas Pitciairn) for 23 years. He succeeded James Sievewright as Moderator in 1848 and was succeeded in turn in 1849 by Mackintosh MacKay.

His ministry in Free Buccleuch was joined by Robert Gordon in 1854, after which Clason became the senior minister. The Free Church built a new church at Buccleuch, south of the old parish church, on the corner of Buccleuch Place. This temporary structure was later replaced in 1856 by a new Gothic-style church on West Crosscauseway at the junction with Chapel Street. Erected around 1862, it was designed by J.J.M. Hay & W.H. Hay of Liverpool and features one of the largest hammerbeam roofs in the country. It remains home to Buccleuch and Greyfriars Free Church following its union with Free Greyfriars in 1897

He died at home, 22 George Square on 30 July 1867. He is buried in the Grange Cemetery in south Edinburgh.

== Artistic recognition ==
He was photographed in 1860 (illustrated below) at the foot of the steps to New College with several other ex-Moderators of the Free Church.

== Family ==
He was brother-in-law toPatrick MacFarlan Moderator of the Free Church in 1845/6.

His brother James Clason (1783-1852) was also a Free Church minister.

== Publications ==
- Considerations on the propriety of erecting the chapels of ease in the parish of St. Cuthbert into parish churches, and on the necessity of increasing the church accommodation (Edinburgh: William Blackwood, 1833)
- To the reverend the Presbytery of Edinburgh, the respectful memorial of the ministers of the chapels of ease within the parish of St. Cuthbert, (1833?)
- Exposure of the false principles contained in the statement published by the Scottish Central Board of Dissenters (Edinburgh: Fraser and Co., 1835)
- Strictures on the Statement of the Central Board of Scottish Dissenters, in two letters (Edinburgh: Fraser and Co., 1835)
- Speech in the presbytery of Edinburgh, 28th January 1835 (Edinburgh: William Blackwood & Sons, 1835)
- The harmony between Christ’s mediatorial offices (Edinburgh: SPCK, 1839)
- 'Our Lord’s Voluntary Surrender of his Life to God the Father,' in The Scottish Christian Herald, Vol.3, p. 281.

== Gallery ==
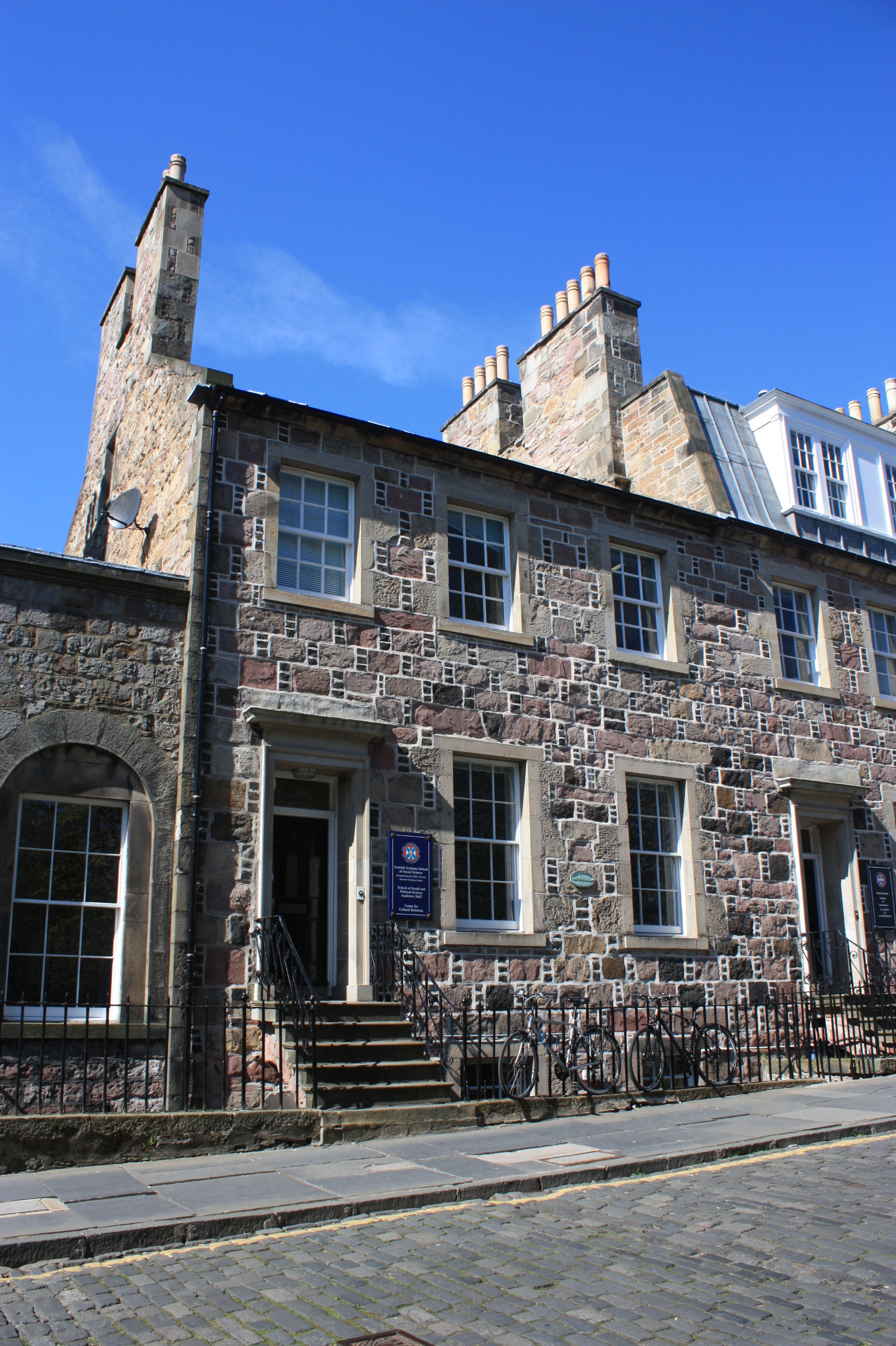
Laurie's house at 22 George Square, Edinburgh

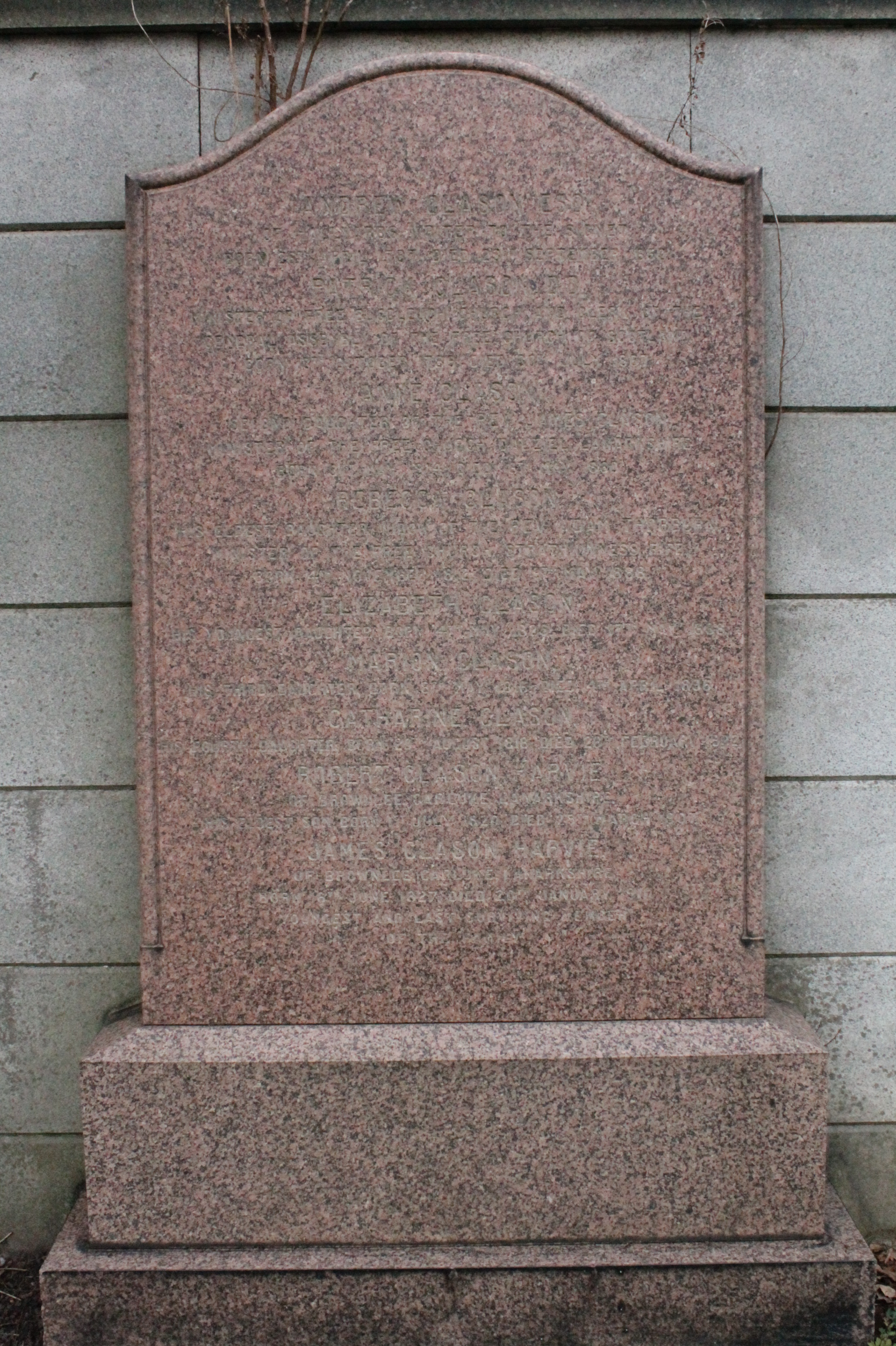
The grave of Clason, Grange Cemetery

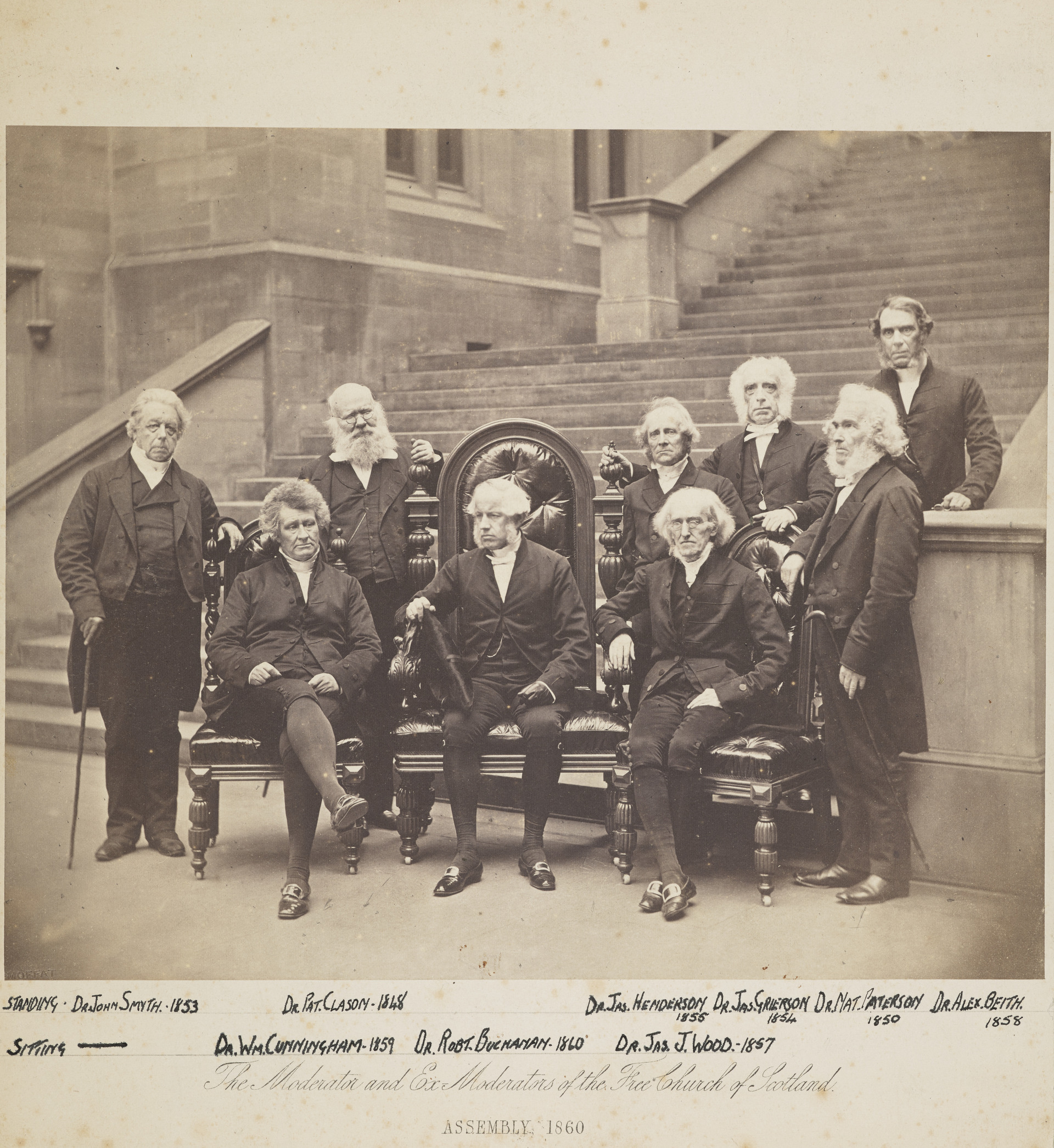
The Moderator and Ex Moderators of the Free Church of Scotland, Assembly; 1860. Pictured, from left to right, are (standing) John Smyth, Clason, James Henderson, James Grierson, Nathaniel Paterson and Alexander Beith (behind); (seated) William Cunningham, Robert Buchanan and James Julius Wood.

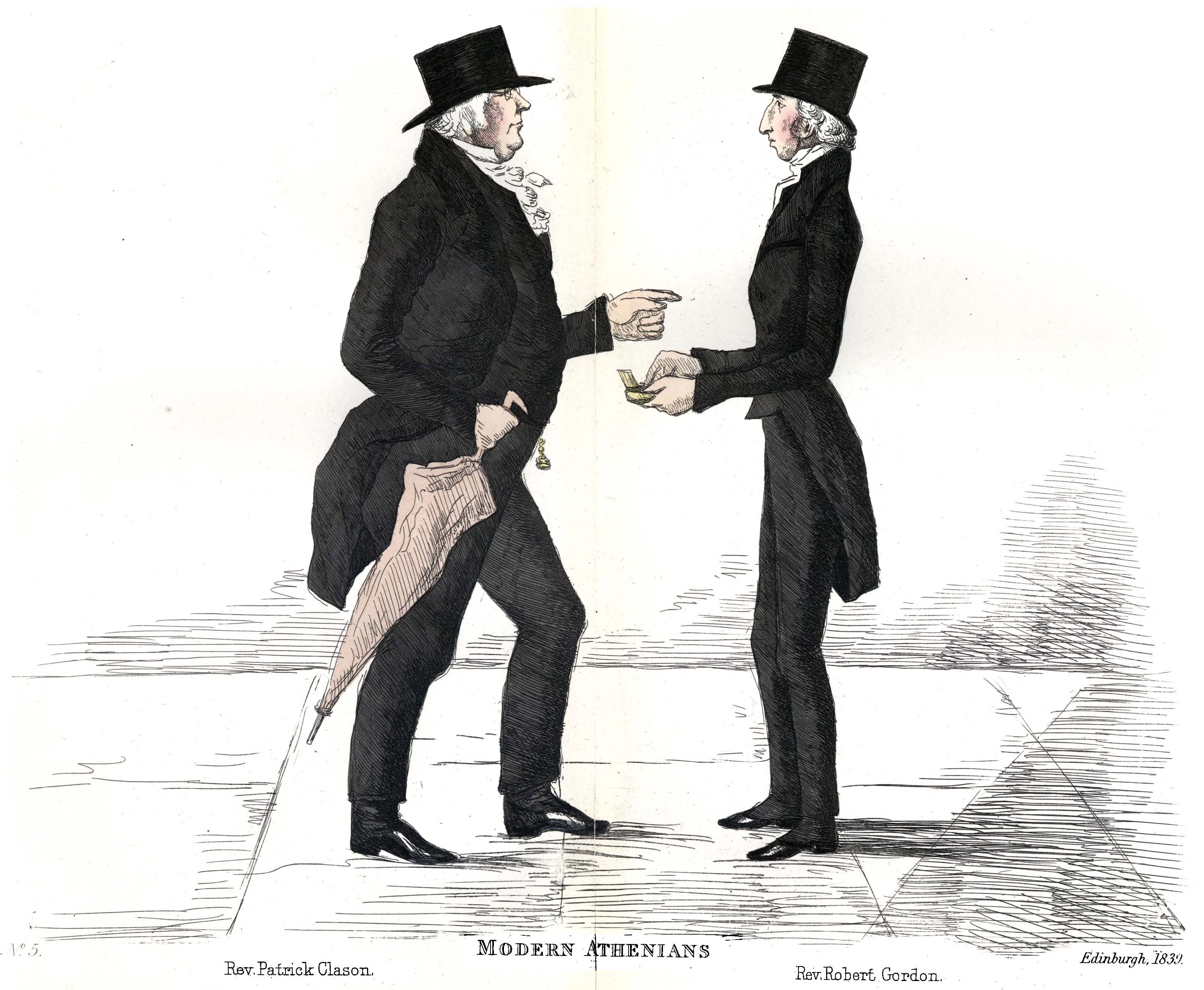
Modern Athenians Two Edinburgh ministers Patrick Clason and Robert Gordon

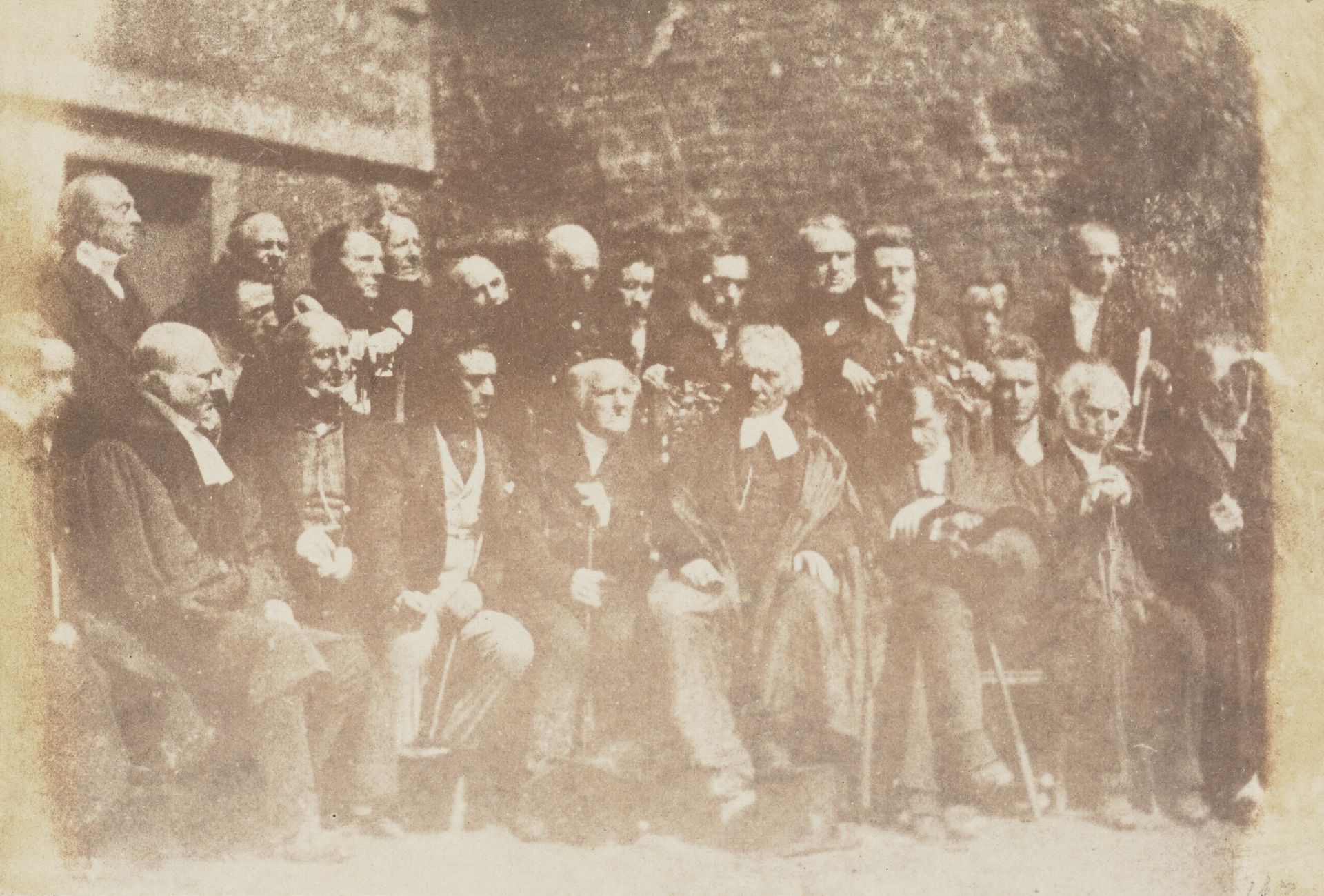
Clason and Edinburgh Presbytery by Hill & Adamson

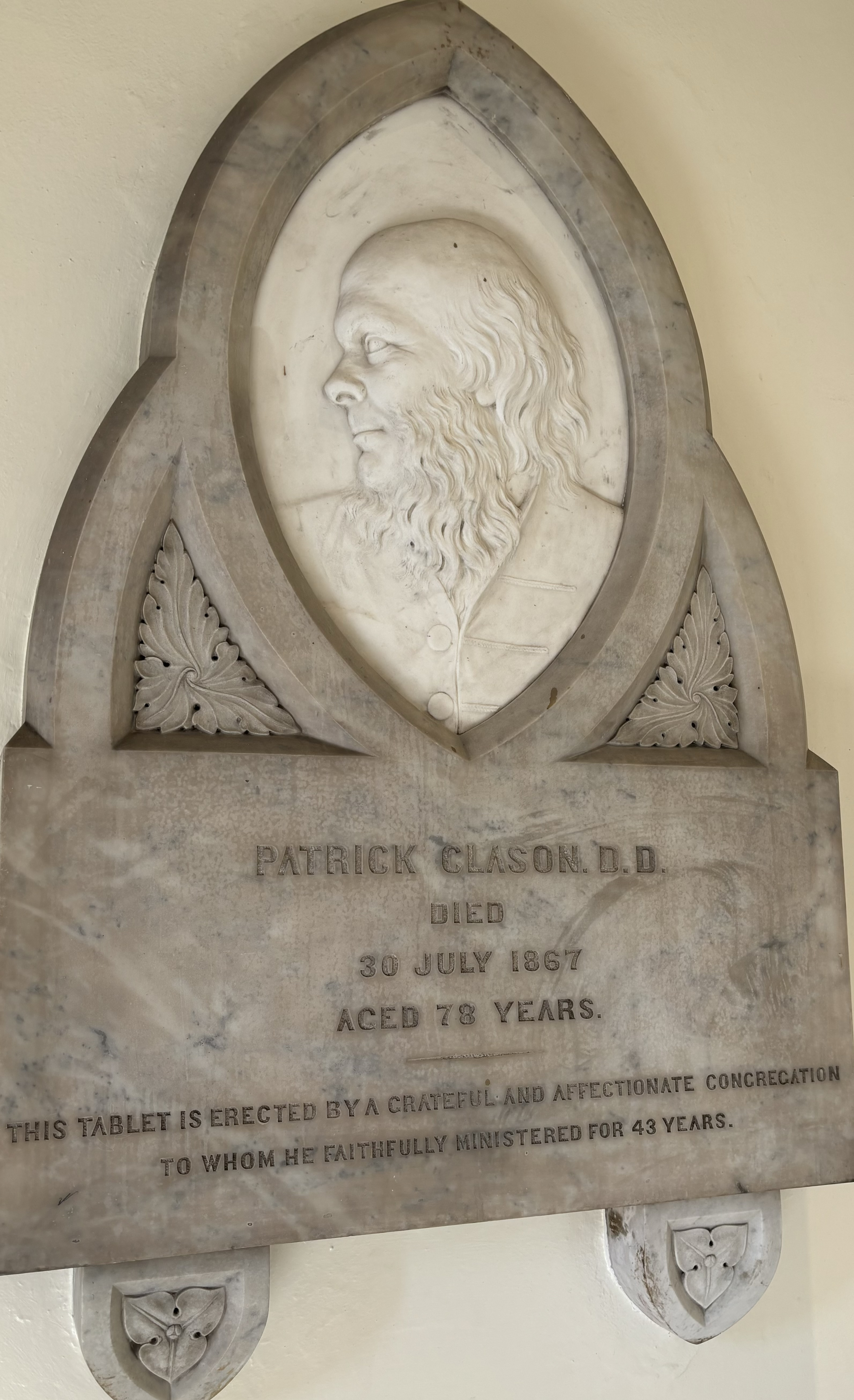
Memorial plaque of Clason in Buccleuch Free Church, Edinburgh
