= Alexander Adam =

Scottish teacher and writer (1741–1809)

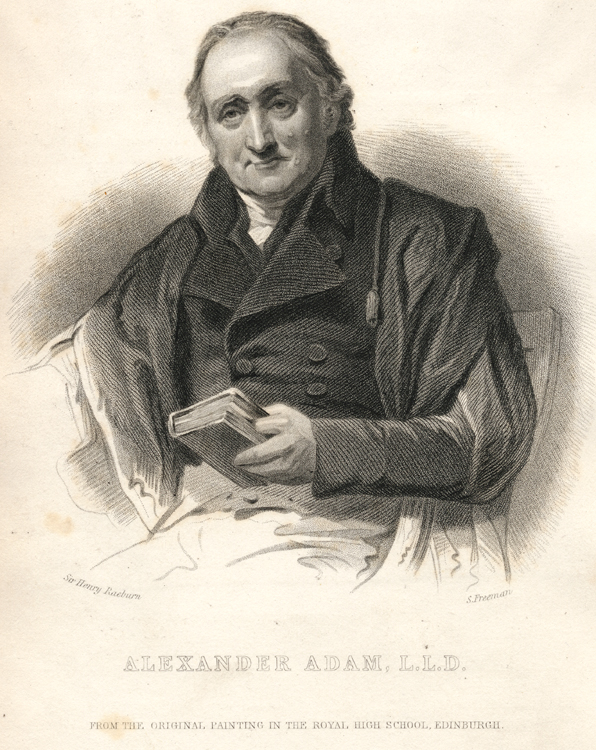
Engraving by Samuel Freeman after Henry Raeburn 1835

Alexander Adam (24 June 1741 – 18 December 1809) was a Scottish teacher and writer on Roman antiquities.

== Life ==
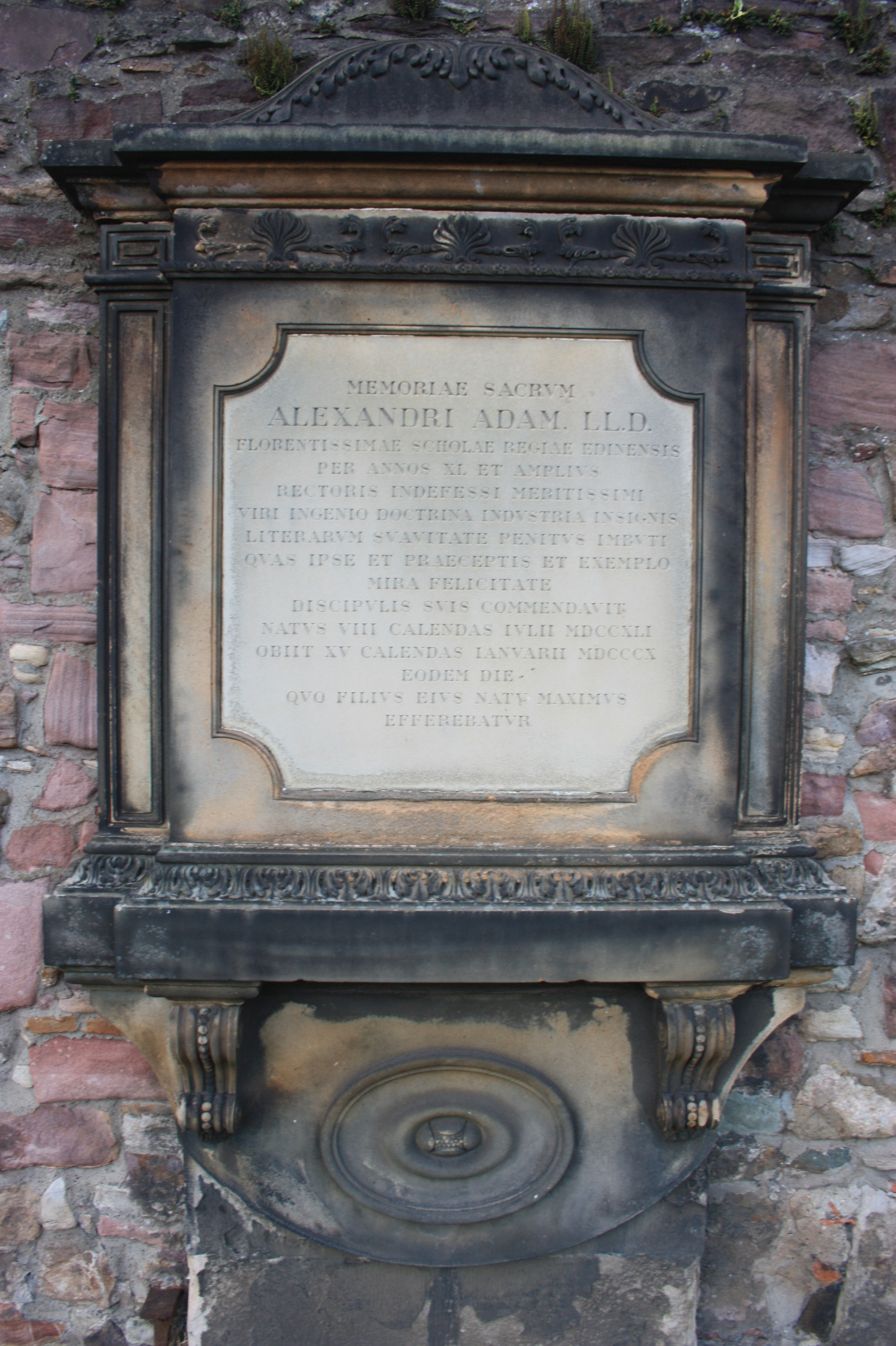
The grave of Alexander Adam, Buccleuch Street graveyard

Alexander Adam was born near Forres, in Moray, the son of a farmer. From his earliest years he showed uncommon diligence and perseverance in classical studies, notwithstanding many difficulties and privations. In 1757 he went to Edinburgh, where he studied at the University of Edinburgh. During this period he lodged with a Mr Watson on Restalrig.

His reputation as a classical scholar secured him a post as assistant at Watson's Hospital and the headmastership in 1761.

In 1764 he became private tutor to Alexander Kincaid, afterwards Lord Provost of Edinburgh, by whose influence he was appointed in 1768 to the rectorship of the High School on the retirement of Mr Matheson, whose substitute he had been for some time before. From this period he devoted himself entirely to the duties of his office and to the preparation of his numerous works on classical literature. His popularity and his success as a teacher are strikingly illustrated by the great increase in the number of his pupils, many of whom subsequently became distinguished men, among them being Walter Scott, Lord Brougham and Francis Jeffrey.

He succeeded in introducing the study of Greek into the curriculum of the school, notwithstanding the opposition of the university headed by Principal William Robertson. In 1780 the University of Edinburgh conferred upon him the honorary degree of Doctor of Laws.

He lived his final years at 39 George Square.

He died after an illness of five days, during which he occasionally imagined himself still at work, his last words being, "It grows dark, boys, you may go". He is buried near his home, in the small graveyard of St. Cuthbert's Chapel of Ease on Chapel Street (usually known as Buccleuch Parish Church). The grave lies on the north wall.

== Selected publications ==
- Principles of Latin and English Grammar (1772) (co-written with Andrew Dalzell), which, being written in English instead of Latin, brought down a storm of abuse upon him.
- Roman Antiquities (1791) — his best work, which passed through a large number of editions and received the unusual compliment of a German translation.
- Summary of Geography and History (1794)
- Compendious Dictionary of the Latin Tongue (1805)

The manuscript of a projected larger Latin dictionary, which he did not live to complete, lies in the library of the High School.

== Family ==
Adam married first, in 1775, Agnes Munro, whose father was minister of Kinloss; and second, in 1780, Jean Cosser, a daughter of the controller of excise in Edinburgh.

Adam's daughter Agnes married the chemist William Prout.
