= Robert Gordon (minister) =

Scottish minister and writer

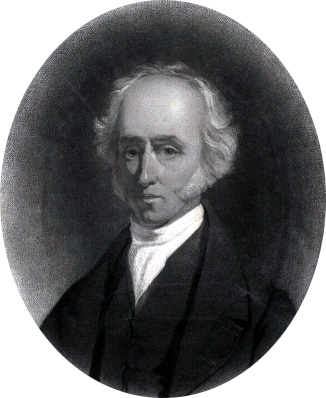
- Robert Gordon of the High Church
- Church: Church of Scotland; Free Church of Scotland

Personal details
- Born: 5 May 1786
- Died: 21 October 1853 (aged 67)

minister of Kinfaunds
- In office 21 October 1853 – January 1824

minister of St. Cuthbert's Chapel of Ease, Edinburgh
- In office January 1824 – 5 January 1824

minister of Hope Park Chapel, Newington
- In office 5 January 1824 – 8 September 1825

minister of New North, Edinburgh
- In office 8 September 1825 – 9 September 1830

minister of St Giles
- In office 9 September 1830 – 4 November 1846

Moderator of the General Assembly
- In office 1841–1842

minister of Free New North, Edinburgh
- In office 18 May 1843 – 21 October 1853

Professor of Divinity, New College
- In office 1847 – 21 October 1853

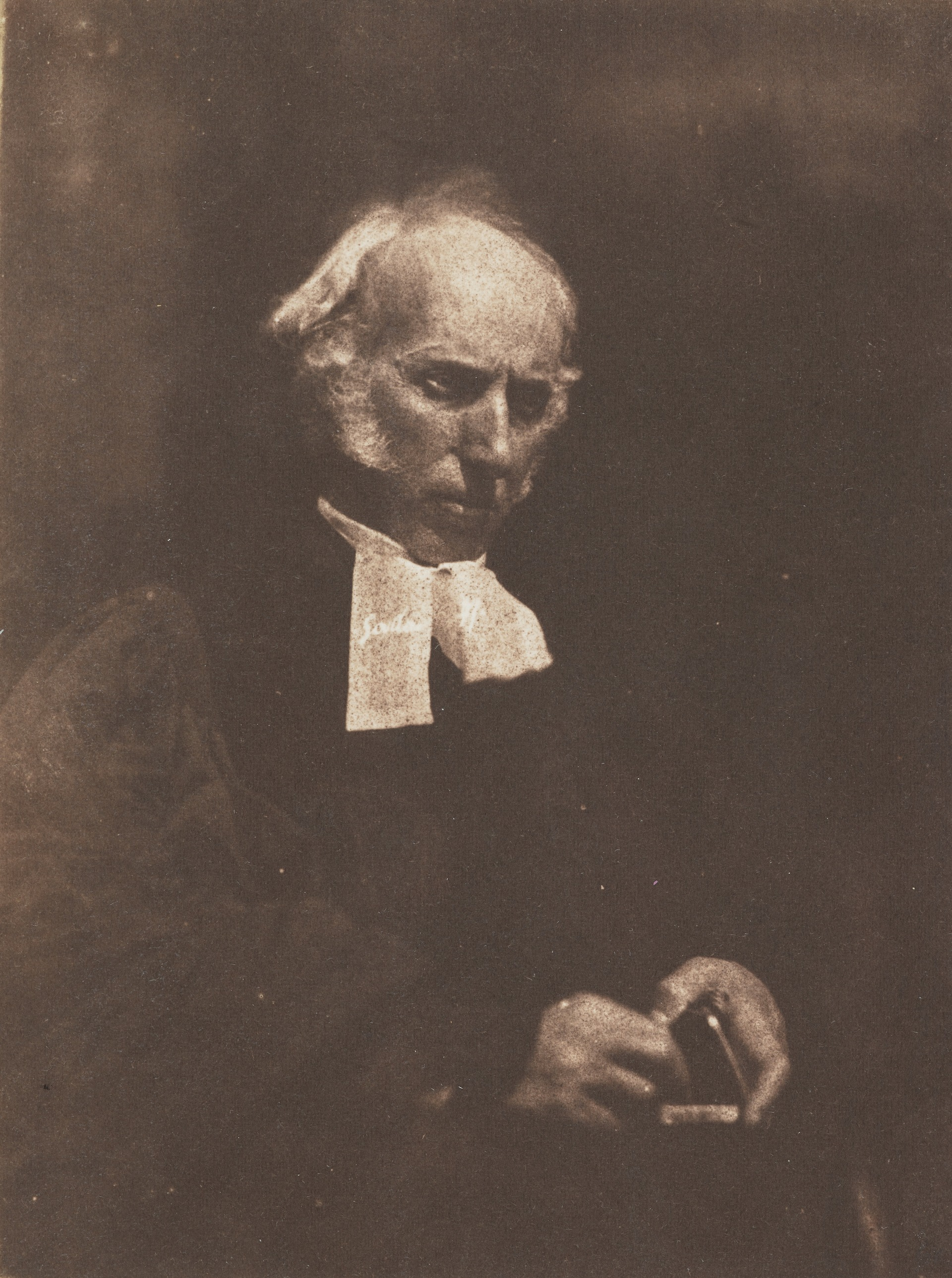
Robert Gordon by Hill & Adamson

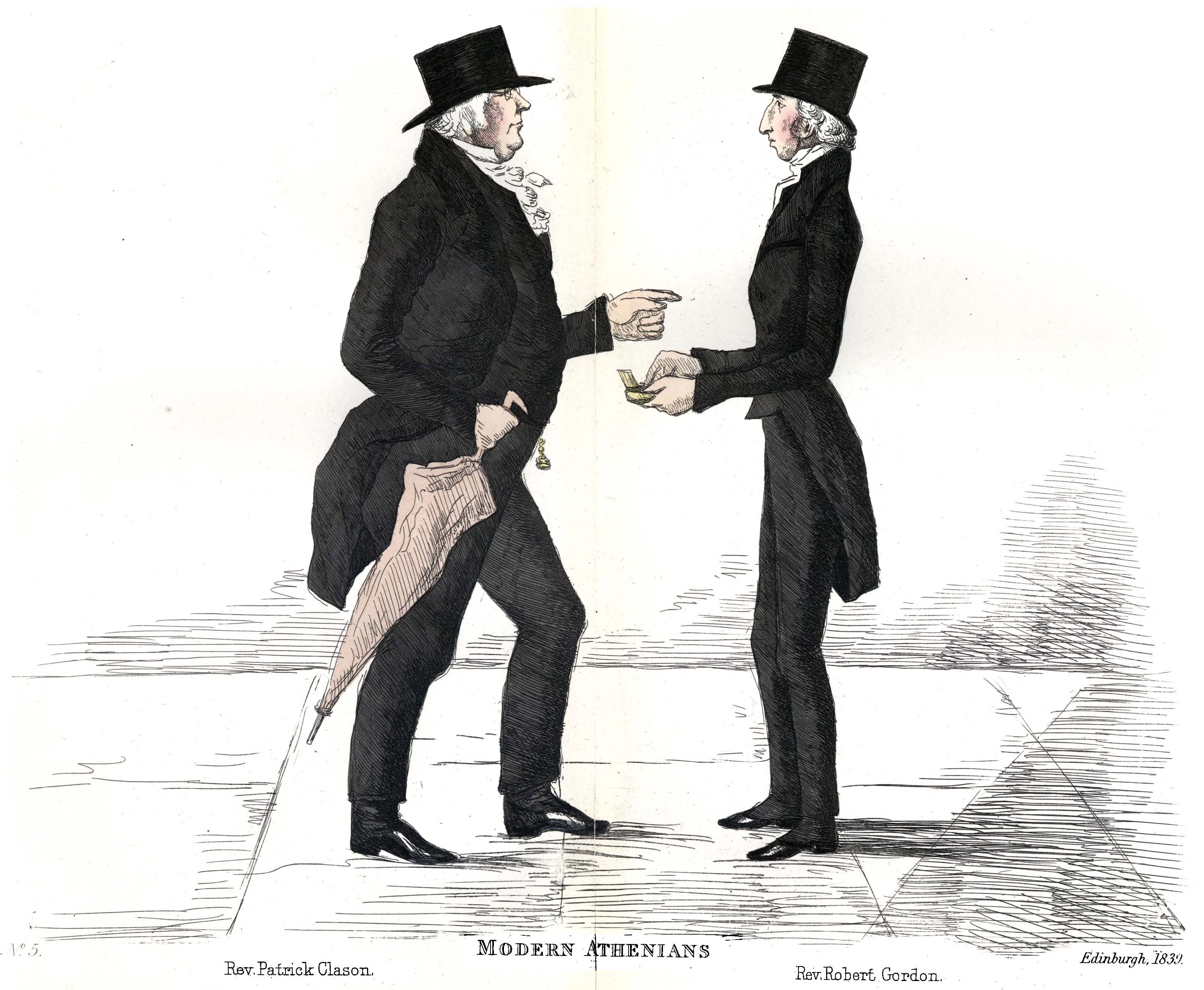
Modern Athenians Patrick Clason and Robert Gordon

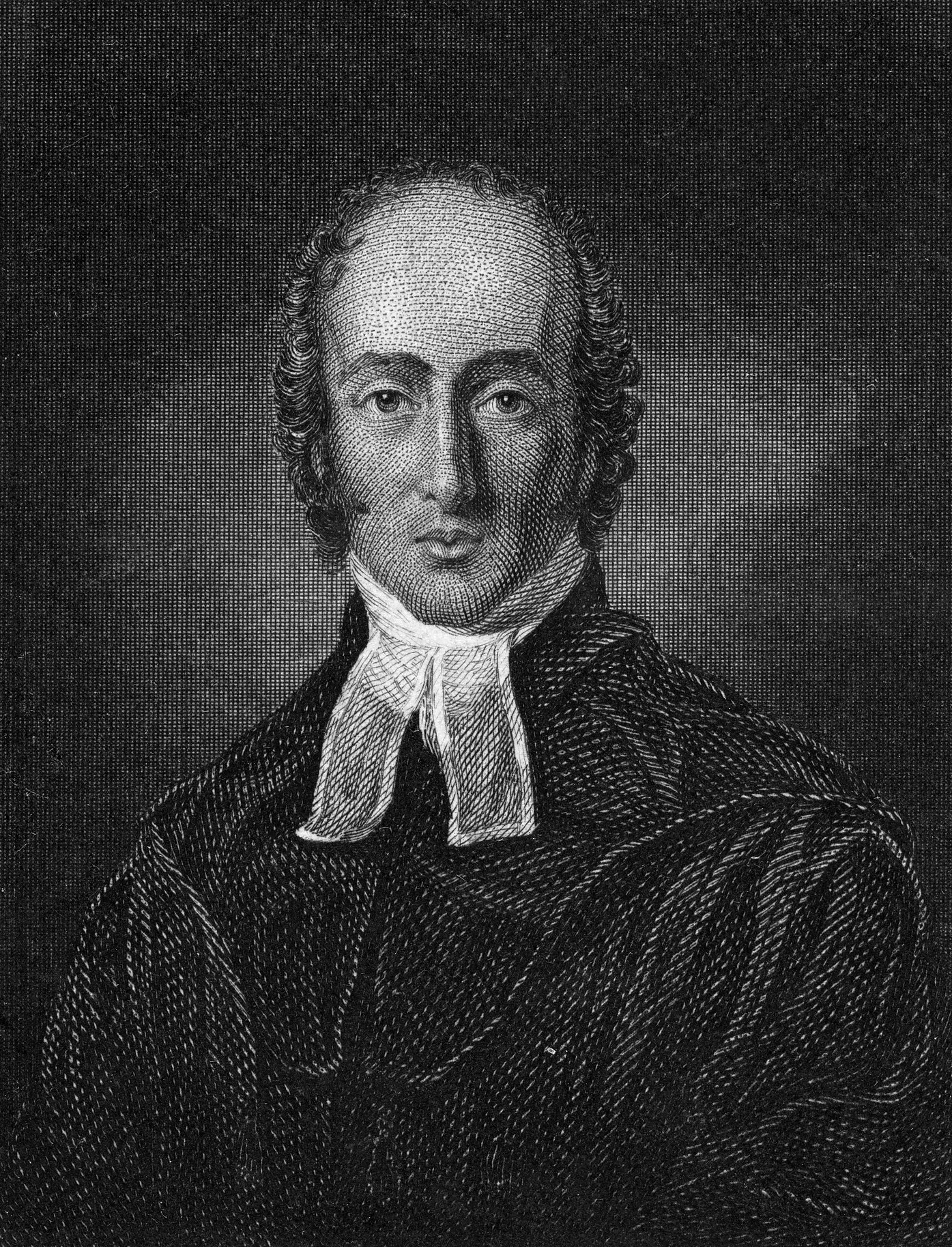
Robert Gordon by William Howison

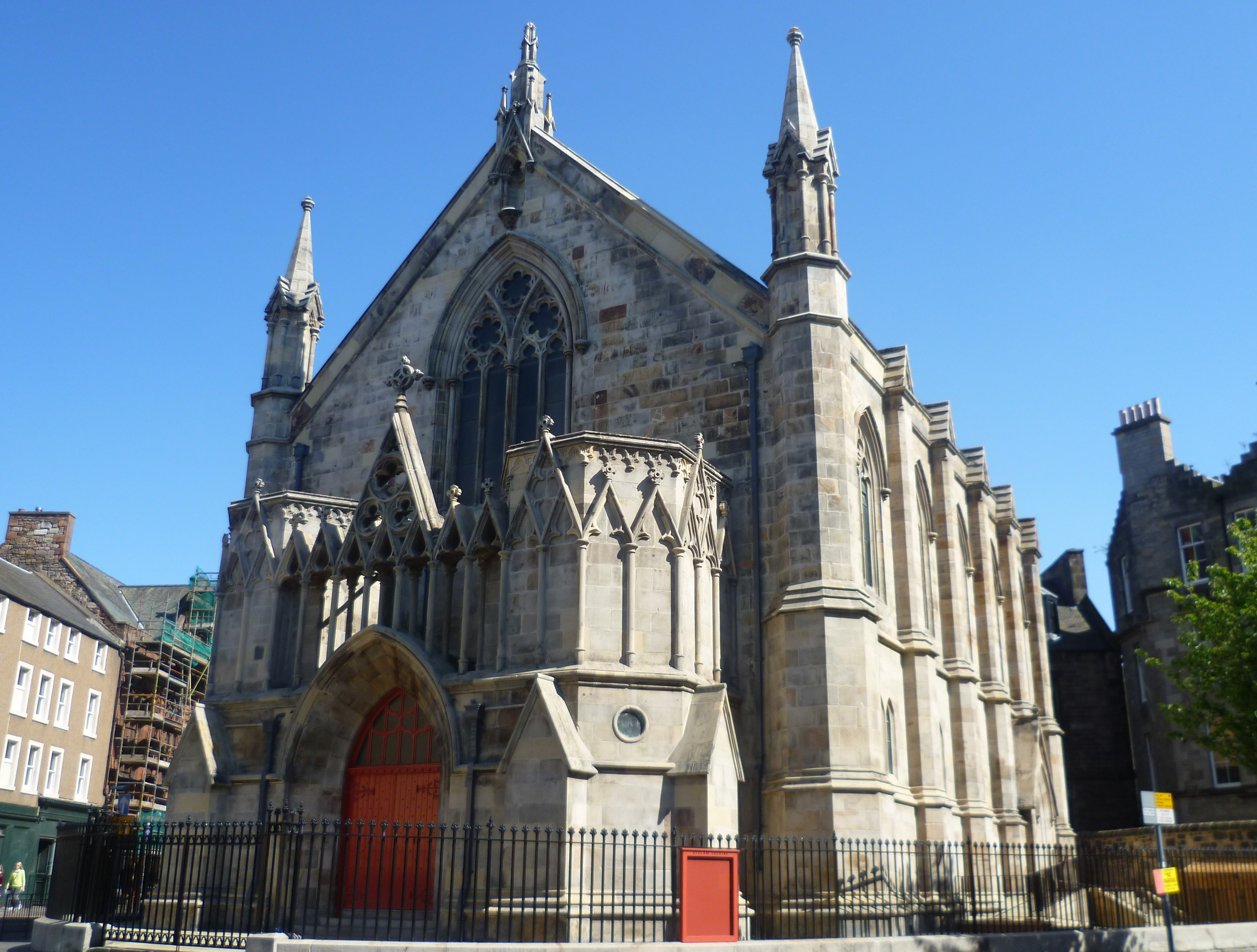
New North Free Church in Edinburgh

Robert Gordon FRSE (5 May 1786 – 21 October 1853) was a Scottish minister and author. Originally prominent in the Church of Scotland, and serving as Moderator of the General Assembly in 1841, following the Disruption of 1843 he joined the Free Church of Scotland and became a prominent figure in that church.

He was the inventor of a self-registering hygrometer.

== Life ==
He was born 5 May 1786 at Old Crawfordton, Glencairn, Dumfriesshire, the son of John Gordon, parish schoolmaster, and his wife, Janet McAdam. He was educated at Tynron school. Aged 15, he was appointed parish teacher at Kirkland School, in place of his father, who had died some years before. He then taught mathematics at Perth Academy.

Gordon then decided to enter the ministry. He initially studied Divinity at the University of Edinburgh, then in 1809 transferred to Marischal College, Aberdeen, where he graduated BD around 1806. After holding several tutorships, he was licensed by the presbytery of Perth on 27 July 1814, and was ordained as minister of the Church of Scotland at Kinfauns Parish Church on 12 September 1816.

In February 1821, he was translated to St. Cuthbert's Chapel of Ease, on Buccleuch Street in Edinburgh, and in January 1824 to the Newington Parish Church to the south, which was built for his growing congregation. In September 1825 he moved to the New North Church (West St Giles), one of the four parish churches housed in St Giles Cathedral, and in 1830 to the High Church of Edinburgh. The latter was normally also housed in St Giles but at the time of his occupation was housed at the new Royal High School on Calton Hill.

In 1823, Aberdeen University awarded him an honorary Doctor of Divinity (DD). In 1827, he was elected a Fellow of the Royal Society of Edinburgh his proposer being Robert Stevenson.

From 1836 till 28 November 1843, he was collector of the Ministers' Widows' Fund. In the 1830s, he is listed as living at 27 Lauriston in the Tollcross area of the city.

When the conflict which led to the disruption of the Scottish church began (around 1833), Gordon had sided with the non-intrusionists, and was one of the committee appointed in 1839 to consider the case of the seven suspended ministers of Strathbogie. During the same year he appeared in the court of session to support the presbytery of Dunkeld, then threatened with censure for disregarding the interdict in the Lathendy case. When the General Assembly of the Church of Scotland met in Edinburgh on 20 May 1841, Gordon was elected Moderator of the General Assembly, the highest position in the Church of Scotland, with all parties uniting in his election: in this capacity he had to pronounce the deposition of the Strathbogie ministers.

Gordon presided at the public meeting in St. Cuthbert's Church, Edinburgh on 25 August 1841, and delivered an address. He was one of the deputation which waited on Sir Robert Peel in the following month to state the case for the church. At the General Assembly of 1842 Gordon seconded the adoption of the "Claim of Right", which had been moved by Thomas Chalmers. During the convocation held in Roxburgh Church in the following November, Gordon presided, and delivered a speech, which has been described as the best apology for the Free Church movement.

In the Disruption of 1843, he left the established church, together with almost the whole of his congregation. He replaced Thomas Chalmers as Professor of Divinity at the Free Church College on the Mound, but declined the Principalship thereof.

From then until death he was minister of the Free New North Church of Edinburgh (later converted into the Bedlam Theatre.

He was a member of the Royal Scottish Society of Arts and was also one of Her Majesty, Queen Victoria's Master Printers for Scotland.

He died at home, 14 Northumberland Street in Edinburgh's Second New Town following a short illness, on 21 October 1853. He is buried in East Preston Street Burial Ground on the south side of the city. The grave lies on the north wall of the western section.

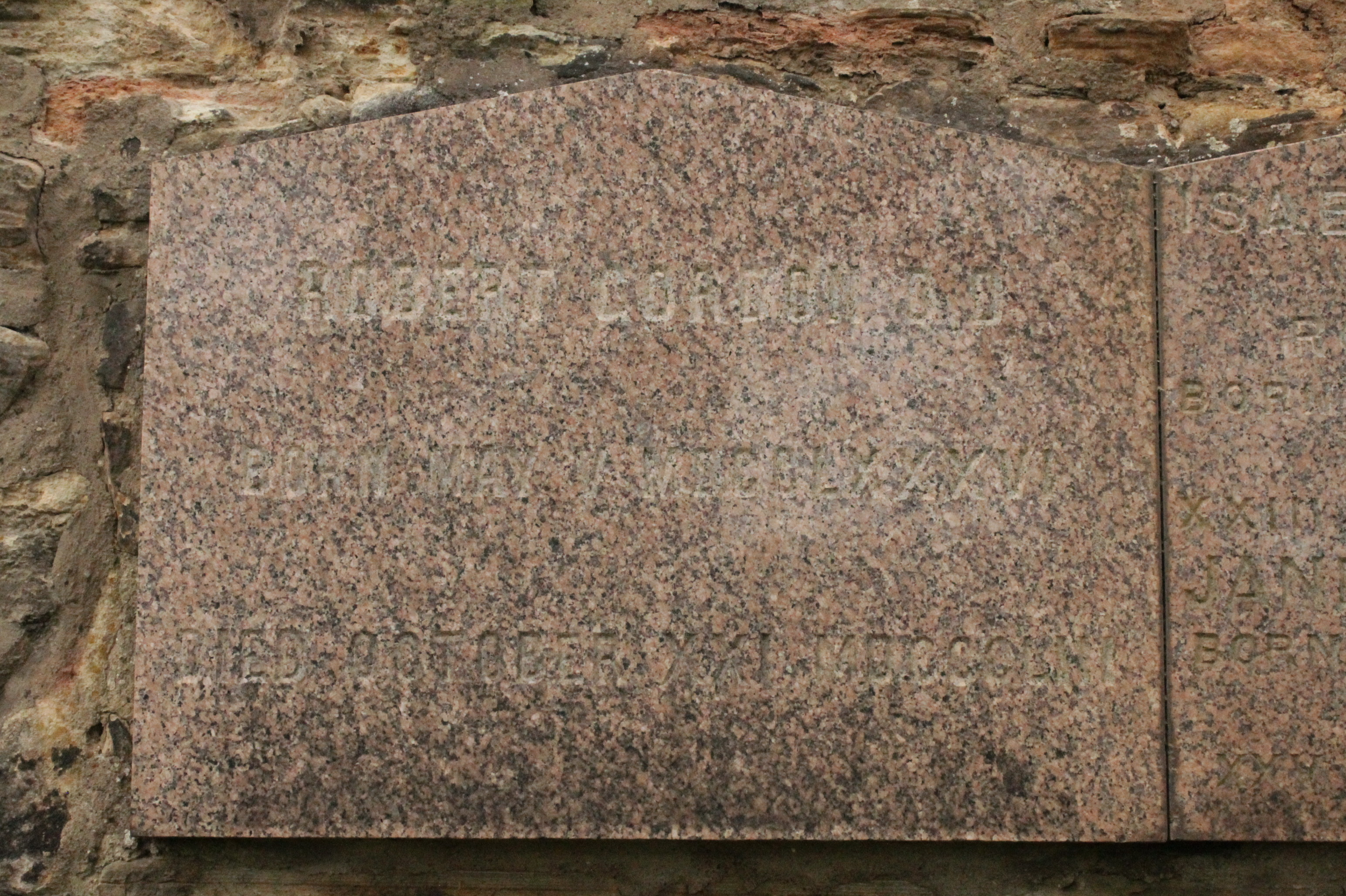
The grave of Rev Robert Gordon, East Preston Street Cemetery, Edinburgh

== Works ==
Early in life he devoted himself to scientific studies, invented a self-registering hygrometer, and was the author of the articles on 'Euclid,' 'Geography,' and 'Meteorology' in the Edinburgh Encyclopædia. He also wrote introductory essays for The Redeemer's Tears, by John Howe, in 1822, 2nd edit. 1825; for the Mourner's Companion, edited by him, with works by John Flavel and others; and for 'Emmanuel,' by Samuel Shaw, in 1829.

A volume of his sermons was published at Edinburgh in 1825, and after his death a selection appeared under the title, 'Christ as made known to the Ancient Church,' vols. i. and ii. on the historical books of scripture in 1854, and vols. iii. and iv. on the prophetic books in 1855. Reports of some of his speeches were also preserved.

- Introductory Essays for The Redeemer's Tears, Mourner's Companion, Emmanuel, Anderson's Scottish Nation
- The Duty of Searching the Scriptures, a sermon (Edinburgh, 1823)
- Sermons (Edinburgh, 1825)
- Christ as Made Known to the Ancient Church, 4 vols. (Edinburgh, 1854)
- the articles Euclid, Geography, Meteorology (Edin. Encyclopoedia).

== Family ==
He married 30 November 1816, Isabella (died 23 September 1877), daughter of Donald Campbell, school-master, Kinnaird, and Mary Halley, and had issue—

- Janet Veitch, born 2 August 1818, died 3 January 1877
- Mary Ann, born 10 January 1820, died 2 March 1821
- James, W.S., Sheriff-substitute of Banffshire, 1853–77, born 24 July 1821, died 23 May 1914
- Robert, minister of Buccleuch Free Church, Edinburgh, born 18 May 1823, died 10 November 1910
- Donald Campbell, minister of South Free Church, Elgin, born 14 November 1824, died 6 November 1866
- Alexander Moncrieff, banker, born 15 May 1826, died October 1889
- Isabella Alison, born 13 January 1828, died 10 June 1900
- Jean, born 25 August 1829, died 2 October 1910
- Susan Campbell, born 14 April 1831
- Georgiana White, born 20 February 1833
- William, M.D., born 12 May 1836
- Ann Bannerman, born 12 May 1836, died 19 November 1910.
