= Dainty Davie =

Scottish Folk Song

Dainty Davie is a folk song, possibly of Scottish origin, which is still part of the repertoire of Scottish and Irish traditional music. It has a long history and two different tunes, both of which have been used for several texts, the best known of which are by Robert Burns.

== History ==
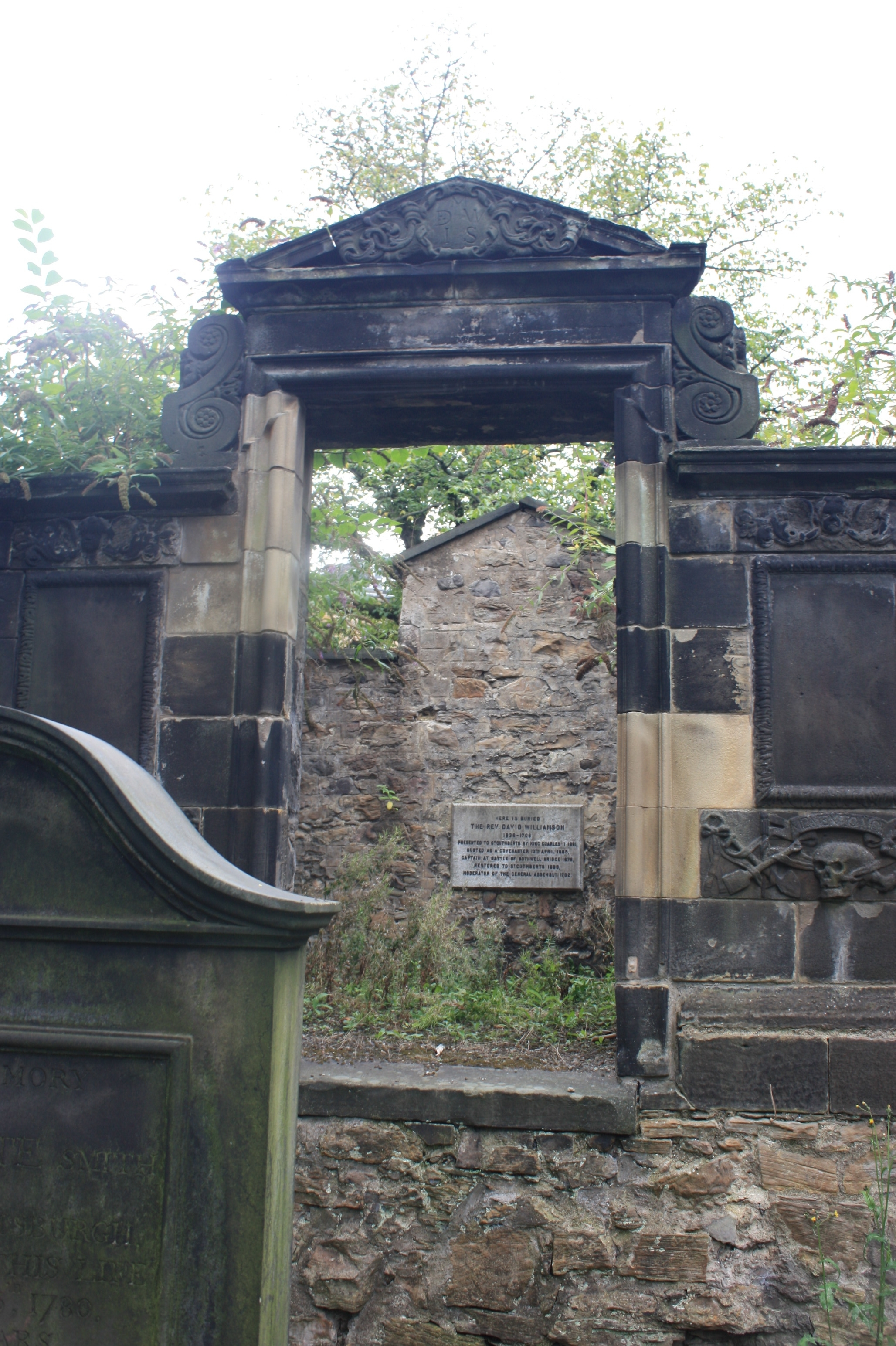
The grave of Dainty Davie (Rev David Williamson), St Cuthberts, Edinburgh

One version of the tune dates from at least the middle of the 17th century. It has been known as Dainty Davy or Dainty Davie since at least 1657, when it was first published in John Playford's collection The Dancing Master.

The tune gained a new text in the late 17th century, when it became adapted as a satire directed against Scottish Covenanters during the period after their 17th century rebellions. This was based on a story published in a 1692 anti-Presbyterian propaganda pamphlet, The Scots Presbyterian Eloquence Displayed, and focusing on a preacher, David Williamson, seven times married minister of St. Cuthbert's Church, Edinburgh (1636 - August 1706). The story was claimed to have then been "well known in Scotland".

In around 1676, Williamson was said to have been staying at the house of a sympathetic family of landowners, the Kerrs (or in some accounts, the Murrays) of the estate of Cherrytrees near Yetholm in the Scottish Borders, when a party of dragoons led by Lieutenant Creighton (the Captain John Creighton or Creichton whose memoirs were written up by Jonathan Swift in 1731) arrived late at night. Mrs Kerr hurriedly concealed Williamson in bed alongside her eighteen-year-old daughter, disguising him with her own nightcap, and went downstairs to "soften the hearts of the soldiery with liquor". While Creighton's men were searching the house, the story ran, Williamson and Miss Kerr became more intimately acquainted, with the result that he was later compelled to marry her. She was in fact his third wife to that point, and he went on to be married three more times, making him the object of some degree of curiosity and ridicule. Creighton, in his ghost-written memoir, added:

This Williamson [...] was alive in the reign of queen Anne; at which time I saw him preaching in one of the kirks in Edinburgh. It is said that king Charles the second, hearing of Williamson's behaviour in lady Cherrytree's house, wished to see the man that discovered so much vigour while his troopers were in search of him; and in a merry way declared, that when he was in the royal oak he could not have kissed the bonniest lass in Christendom.

The tune and title of Dainty Davie were soon adapted to a heavily innuendo-laden text making fun of Williamson and his predicament, and in this form became well known in Scotland.

A later version, far exceeding the original in bawdiness, was written or adapted by Robert Burns, whose text was published in Merry Muses of Caledonia (1799). This was set to a different tune, in Burns' time also known as The Gardeners' March. An alternative and innuendo-free version of the text was also written by Burns, who included it in the Scots Musical Museum, though he later produced a further version, referring to the Museum setting as "damned nonsense" as they had "drawled out the tune to twelve lines of poetry". Various other stall-ballad versions also circulated, and the tune has been adapted for other songs and ballads, such as Lucky Nancy in Allan Ramsey's Tea-Table Miscellany.

== Text ==
Many versions of the text contain several dialect terms, notably in the refrain, which uses the phrases so leeze me on (i.e. "[so] dear is to me", "[so] I am pleased with" ) and curly pow (an affectionate form of "curly head").

== Versions ==
Although popular in the repertoire of Scottish traditional music, the song has also been performed by Irish musicians, with widely-differing versions recorded by The Fureys and The Dubliners (though both use The Gardeners' March as the tune).
