= Hew Scott =

Scottish theologian (1791–1872)

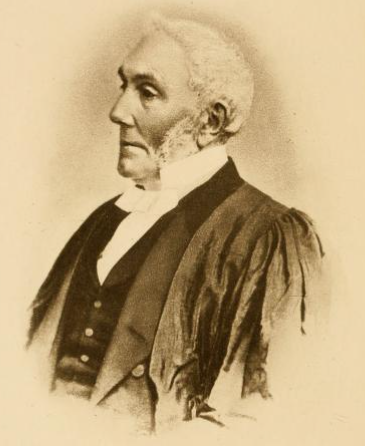
Rev Hew Scott

Hew Scott (5 February 1791 - 12 July 1872) was a minister of the Church of Scotland parish of Anstruther Wester. He is largely remembered as a religious researcher and author. His "magnum opus" is the comprehensive, multi-volume work, Fasti Ecclesiae Scoticanae: The succession of ministers in the parish churches of Scotland, from the reformation, A.D. 1560, to the present time. This is a detailed, biographical record of each of the ministers of each of the parishes of the Church of Scotland from 1560 to 1870. (It also refers to earlier priests/ministers, where possible). It was first published between 1866 and 1871 but it is regularly updated by the Church of Scotland.

The project took him 50 years and covered 760 parishes (often with more than one church per parish), including parishes which were either gone, amalgamated or fleeting in existence. Volume 1 was in part aided by Dr Gordon of Newbattle, Dr Struthers of Prestonpans and David Laing.

Profits from the book went to the Ministers' Daughters' College. However, it was not well received in the literary world, as it is hardly "bedtime reading". Of 250 copies printed less than half sold. Nevertheless, it is a truly outstanding academic work of research. Scott became somewhat depressed regarding the huge task he had taken on, especially when starting to lose his eyesight in later life.

== Life ==
He was born in Haddington, East Lothian on 5 February 1791, the son of Robert Scott an excise officer (a distant cousin of Sir Walter Scott) and his second wife, Catherine Dunbar of Coldingham.

He taught himself Latin by the age of 10 and was encouraged by the local minister, Rev Dr Lorimer, to study for the ministry.

On the death of his father, around 1800, the family fell into extreme poverty and his mother opened a small shop in order to survive. Hew was apprenticed to an ironmonger around 1803 and spent evenings selling stationery door-to-door. Around 1810 he opened his own shop, selling books.

Through his mother's relatives in Coldingham he appears to have met George Dunbar who despite both poverty and disablement managed to gain a degree at Glasgow University. He applied for Edinburgh University and matriculated in 1813. He studied a wide range of subjects and said "had the [Napoleonic] war continued, he would have been an army surgeon rather than a minister". Part of this period would now be called "working his way through college" and twice he was employed as assistant librarian in the Edinburgh university in exchange for his university fees. In 1816 he transferred to King's College, Aberdeen and it was there where he got his first MA. He graduated in divinity (as a second degree) in 1820.

At some point during his Edinburgh studies he met the antiquarian Thomas Thomson, and assisted Thomson in some huge projects of assembling information from public registries. This appears to have sparked the idea of Fasti: an amalgamation of every parish record into one place. This paralleled John Le Neve's Fasti Ecclesiæ Anglicanæ.

Although licensed to preach in 1820 he was not ordained until 1829, and this was to a post in Canada. David Laing intervened though and got him to stay in Scotland (much to his economic disbenefit). He had a series of minor roles as assistant at variously, Garvald, Whitekirk, Cockpen and Temple. Not until 1839 did he get his first position as full minister at Anstruther Wester. He was presented by Sir Windham Carmichael Anstruther in replacement of Rev Dr Carstairs.

In the Disruption of 1843 he was asked why he did not "get out" to which he replied "I had too much difficulty to get in!".

In 1867 he received an honorary Doctorate of Divinity (DD) from St Andrews University mainly for his work on Fasti (which was first published in 1866). Hew probably sighed a huge sigh of relief on publication, before realising within two or three years that the work had to be updated regularly in order to retain its value. It therefore became a never-ending project.

He died on 12 July 1872 in Anstruther.

His will endowed a "Scott and Dunbar Prize" at Edinburgh University: this is an annual prize for the best Greek student.

== Fasti Ecclesiae Scoticanae ==
=== First Edition ===
Volume 1, Part 1 - Synod of Lothian and Tweeddale - 1866 also

Volume 1, Part 2 - Synods of Merse and Teviotdale, Dumfries, and Galloway - 1867 also

Volume 2, Part 1 - Synod of Glasgow and Ayr - 1868 also

Volume 2, Part 2 - Synods of Fife, and Perth and Stirling - 1869 also

Volume 3, Part 1 - Synods of Argyll, Glenelg, Moray, Ross, Sutherland and Caithness, Orkney and Zetland - 1870 also

Volume 3, Part 2 - Synods of Aberdeen, and Angus and Mearns - 1871 also

=== Second Edition ===
Volume I - Synod of Lothian and Tweeddale - 1915 also

Volume II - Synods of Merse and Teviotdale, Dumfries, and Galloway - 1917

Volume III - Synod of Glasgow and Ayr - 1920 also

Volume IV - Synods of Argyll, and of Perth and Stirling - 1923

Volume V - Synods of Fife, and of Angus and Mearns - 1925 also

Volume VI - Synods of Aberdeen and of Moray - 1926 also

Volume VII - Synods of Ross, Sutherland and Caithness, Glenelg, Orkney and of Shetland, the Church in England, Ireland and Overseas - 1928

== Family ==
In 1859 he married Sarah MacDougall Kennedy. She was a widow, the daughter of James Kennedy (a farmer in Colmonell), and died in 1874.
