= Fasti Ecclesiae Scoticanae =

Books containing lists of ministers from the Church of Scotland

Fasti Ecclesiae Scoticanae, The Succession of Ministers in the Church of Scotland from the Reformation is a title given to books containing lists of ministers from the Church of Scotland.

The first volume was published in 1866 by Rev Hew Scott.

The original volumes covered all ministers of the Established Church of Scotland (before the union of the Church of Scotland and the United Free Church of Scotland in 1929). Volumes I-VII were published on a regional basis (by Synod), later volumes cover the whole of the Church of Scotland:

== Volumes ==
- Volume I: Synod of Lothian and Tweeddale, 1866
- Volume II: Synods of Merse and Teviotdale, Dumfries, and Galloway, 1867
- Volume III: Synod of Glasgow and Ayr, 1868
- Volume IV: Synods of Argyll, and Perth and Stirling, 1869
- Volume V: Synods of Fife, 1870
- Volume VI: Synods of Aberdeen, 1871
- Volume VII. Synods of Ross, Sutherland, Caithness, Glenelg, Orkney
- Vol. VIII: to 2 October 1929, and addenda and corrigenda. Edinburgh, Oliver and Boyd, 1950.
- Vol. IX: 2 October 1929 – 1954 ed. John Alexander Lamb. Edinburgh, Oliver and Boyd, 1961.
- Vol. X: 1955-75 ed. Donald Farquhar MacLeod MacDonald. Edinburgh, Saint Andrew Press, 1981.
- Vol. XI: 1976-99 ed. Finlay Angus John MacDonald, Edinburgh, T & T Clark, 2000.
- Vol. XII: 1999-2020 ed. for the Assembly Business Committee of the Church of Scotland by Roy M. Pinkerton, MA, DipCompPhil, FSAScot; Editorial Assistant Alison Murray, MA. Edinburgh, The Church of Scotland Assembly Business Committee, 2021.

Fasti Ecclesiae Scoticanae Medii Aevi Ad Annum 1638 (revised edition, edited by D. E. R. Watt and A. L. Murray) was published by the Scottish Record Society (Edinburgh, 2003).

Volume I, Synod of Lothian and Tweeddale and Volume II, Synods of Merse and Teviotdale Dumfries & Galloway are now on line at Scottish Ministers and History.
