= James Shepherd =

James Shepherd may refer to:

- James Shepherd (rugby league), Australian rugby league footballer
- James Shepherd (Australian cricketer) (1857–?), Australian cricketer
- James Shepherd (New Zealand cricketer) (1892–1970), New Zealand cricketer
- James E. Shepherd (1847–1910), lawyer and jurist who served on the North Carolina Supreme Court
- James Shepherd (biochemist) (born 1944), pioneer in the investigation of the causes, prevention and treatment of coronary heart disease
- James Shepherd (missionary) (1796–1882), Australian-born Wesleyan Christian missionary and settler in New Zealand
- James Shepherd (doctor) (1847–1926), physician and missionary
- James Shepherd (musician) (1936–2023), English cornet soloist and founder of James Shepherd Versatile Brass

== See also ==
- Jim Shepherd (born 1940), Australian professional tennis player
- James E. Shepard (1875–1947), American educator
- James Sheppard (disambiguation)
