= Katherine Davidson =

Church of Scotland deaconess (1845–1925)

- Born: 5 July 1845; Aberdeen
- Died: 12 May 1925 (aged 79); Edinburgh

Katherine Helen Davidson (1845 – 1925) was a Church of Scotland deaconess who was the first deputy of the Church of Scotland's Woman's Guild.

== Life ==
Davidson was born in 1845. Her parents were Mary Anne (born Leslie) and Professor Patrick Davidson. Her father was an advocate and he taught at King's College, Aberdeen University. She was the third daughter and they had nine other children.

One of her first jobs was in Surrey. For four years she worked at the Princess Mary Village Homes. This organisation, which was founded in 1872, cared for the daughters of women who were in prison. She then worked for the Mildmay Centre in London and then in Guernsey.

The General Assembly of the Church of Scotland's Woman's Guild had been founded in 1887 at the suggestion of A. H. Charteris. Another source credits his wife Catherine Charteris's "wise counsel and loving heart" and says that the guild "owes its very existence to her efforts".

Davidson became a protegee of A. H. Charteris. She became both a deaconess and the Women's Guild's first deputy in 1889. She was credited with inspiring more branches with her infectious enthusiasm as she went to over 100 different parishes by horse and cart. There were only 33 branches of the guild when she started. By 1907 there was 29,000 members in 400 branches.

Besides the Guild she also endeavored to help people in the fishing industry, and paid for the building of a rest house in Great Yarmouth for industry workers. She was also involved with an orphanage in Musselburgh.

Davidson was severely injured in an accident in 1918.

== Death and legacy ==
Davidson died on 12 May 1925. She was buried in Banchory-Ternan Kirkyard in Banchory together with four of her siblings. The stone records that she was one of the first three deaconesses and mentions her work with the guild and with Scotland's fisher girls.

When she died there were 879 different branches of the Women's Guild which had in total 52,000 members.
