= Nottingham Girls' Academy =

Location
- Robin's Wood Road; Aspley; Nottingham, Nottinghamshire, NG8 3LD; England
- Coordinates: 52.9671°N 1.2014°W

Information
- Type: Academy
- Department for Education URN: 137184 Tables
- Ofsted: Reports
- Gender: Girls
- Age: 11 to 19
- Website: http://www.nottinghamgirlsacademy.org/

Nottingham Girls' Academy (formerly Manning Comprehensive School) is a girls' secondary school and sixth form with academy status, located in the Aspley area of Nottingham in the English county of Nottinghamshire.

== History ==
=== Grammar schools ===
Manning Grammar School for Girls, was originally part of the High Pavement Grammar School until 1931, when it moved into new buildings on Gregory Boulevard. High Pavement had previously been coeducational from 1898. It opened in April 1931. It was evacuated with High Pavement to Mansfield in the war. The two schools had joint theatre productions in the 1960s and 1970s. And there were marriages. It moved in 1983 to a former school, when local schools closed.

Nottinghamshire Education Committee bought the Brincliffe School for Girls in 1920 for £3,400. In 1960 there were plans to rebuild the school as a £195,547 three-form technical grammar school. Many parents protested, in 1973 and 1974, about the planned closure planned for 1975. Nottingham's schools now are the second-lowest at GCSE in England.

=== Peveril Secondary School ===
This opened in September 1955. It was officially opened on Thursday 18 October 1956, and cost £173,941. Mr S Ward was the headmaster, and he would leave in 1972.

=== Comprehensive ===
Previously a community school administered by Nottingham City Council, Manning Comprehensive School converted to academy status on 1 September 2011 and was renamed Nottingham Girls' Academy. The school is sponsored by the Greenwood Dale Foundation Trust, however Nottingham Girls' Academy continues to coordinate with Nottingham City Council for admissions.

Nottingham Girls' Academy offers GCSEs and BTECs as programmes of study for pupils, while students in the sixth form have the option to study from a range of A Levels and further BTECs.

== Alumni ==
Notable alumni are categorised from the school's former names.

=== Peveril Bilateral School ===
- Su Pollard, actress

=== Brincliffe Grammar School for Girls ===
- Enid Bakewell, cricketer
- Sue Clifford, founder of Common Ground, known for Apple Day
- Ruth Kennedy, athlete
- Dame Laura Knight, artist during World War II

=== Manning Grammar School ===
- Vera Carstairs (née Hunt) known for work on social deprivation, married Morris Carstairs in 1950, psychiatrist and vice-chancellor of the University of York

=== Manning Comprehensive School ===
- Emily Campbell, weightlifter
