= McMurtrie =

McMurtrie is a surname. Notable people with the surname include:

- Charles McMurtrie (1878–1951), pioneer Australian rugby union and rugby league footballer who represented his country at both sports
- David McMurtrie Gregg (1833–1916), farmer, diplomat, and a Union cavalry general in the American Civil War
- Douglas Crawford McMurtrie (1888–1944), American typeface designer, graphic designer and historian and bibliographer of printing
- G. McMurtrie Godley (1917–1999), American diplomat and United States Ambassador to Laos 1969–1973, at the height of the Vietnam War
- John McMurtrie (born 1969), British music photographer
- Mary McMurtrie (1902–2003), British botanical artist and horticulturalist
- William McMurtrie (1851–1913) Chief Government Chemist
