= Vladimir Lidin =

Sovjet author

Vladimir Germanovich Lidin (Russian: Владимир Германович Лидин; 15 February 1894 – 27 September 1979) was a Soviet fiction writer and memoirist.

== Biography ==
Lidin was born Vladimir Gomberg to a Russianized Jewish family in Moscow. His father owned an export business. He attended the Larazev Institute of Oriental Languages and Moscow University, from where he graduated in 1915 with a degree in law. Owing inspiration to the Russian neorealists and to Western writers such as Guy de Maupassant, he published his first short story in 1908 and by 1912 he was contributing stories to different magazines and newspapers. In 1916 he published his first collection of prose, under the nihilistic title "Tryn-trava", which translates as "nothing matters".

During the First World War, Lidin fought on the eastern front. During the subsequent Russian Civil War, he joined the side of the Red Army and served in eastern Siberia. His experience in these conflicts served as inspiration for two short stories collections that were published in 1923: Daily Humdrum and Tales of Many Days. After the war he traveled widely in Western Europe and the Middle East, before returning to Moscow, where he became one of the most visible Soviet writers of the 1920s. During this period he published about 20 books, including short and long fiction, travel literature and essays.

His big international break came in 1931, when his 1927 novel The Apostate was published in English and several other European languages and brought him international recognition. In the United States, the novel was published in 1932 under the title "The Price of Life". During this time, he was travelling so extensively that he was considered to have "resided partly abroad". His writing style became more streamlined in the 1930s, with the social message of his writing becoming more obvious. His best known works of this period were Fishing Time (1930), About the Far East (1932), and the novel The Great, or the Pacific (1933), written after a trip to the Far East and all devoted to building of a new life on Russia's eastern frontier.

After Russia's entry into World War II, Lidin worked as a war reporter for the Russian daily Izvestia between 1941 and 1942, documenting the first year of the German invasion in a collection of essays published under the name Winter of 1941. During this time he also wrote an essay titled "Talnoe", about the extermination of Jews by the Nazi Army in Ukraine, that was included in The Black Book: The Nazi Crime Against the Jewish People, a collection of testimonies and first-hand accounts of the perpetuation of the Holocaust, which was used as evidence during the Nuremberg Trials, but was never published in the Soviet Union.

Joseph Stalin's displeasure with one of his reportages made Lidin fall out of favour with the Soviet authorities. He was demoted to a position at a regional military newspaper and between 1943 and 1946 there he had no works published, a significant gap in his otherwise prolific and constant output. It wasn't until the late 1940s that he was once again able to publish his work. Other than earlier writings who were only now published – most importantly, the novel Exile, dealing with the first two years of the Nazi invasion, written in 1942 and published in 1947 – his writings wore mostly conformist. After the death of Stalin, he was offered a string of prominent positions in the Union of Soviet Writers and taught at the Maxim Gorky Literature Institute. In 1957 he published the literary memoir People and Meetings. He continued to write and publish for the rest of his life.

He died in 1979, in Moscow at the age of 85. Renewed interest for his work in the post-Soviet era lead to his unpublished notebooks from the 1970s being published in 1991.

== Selected bibliography ==
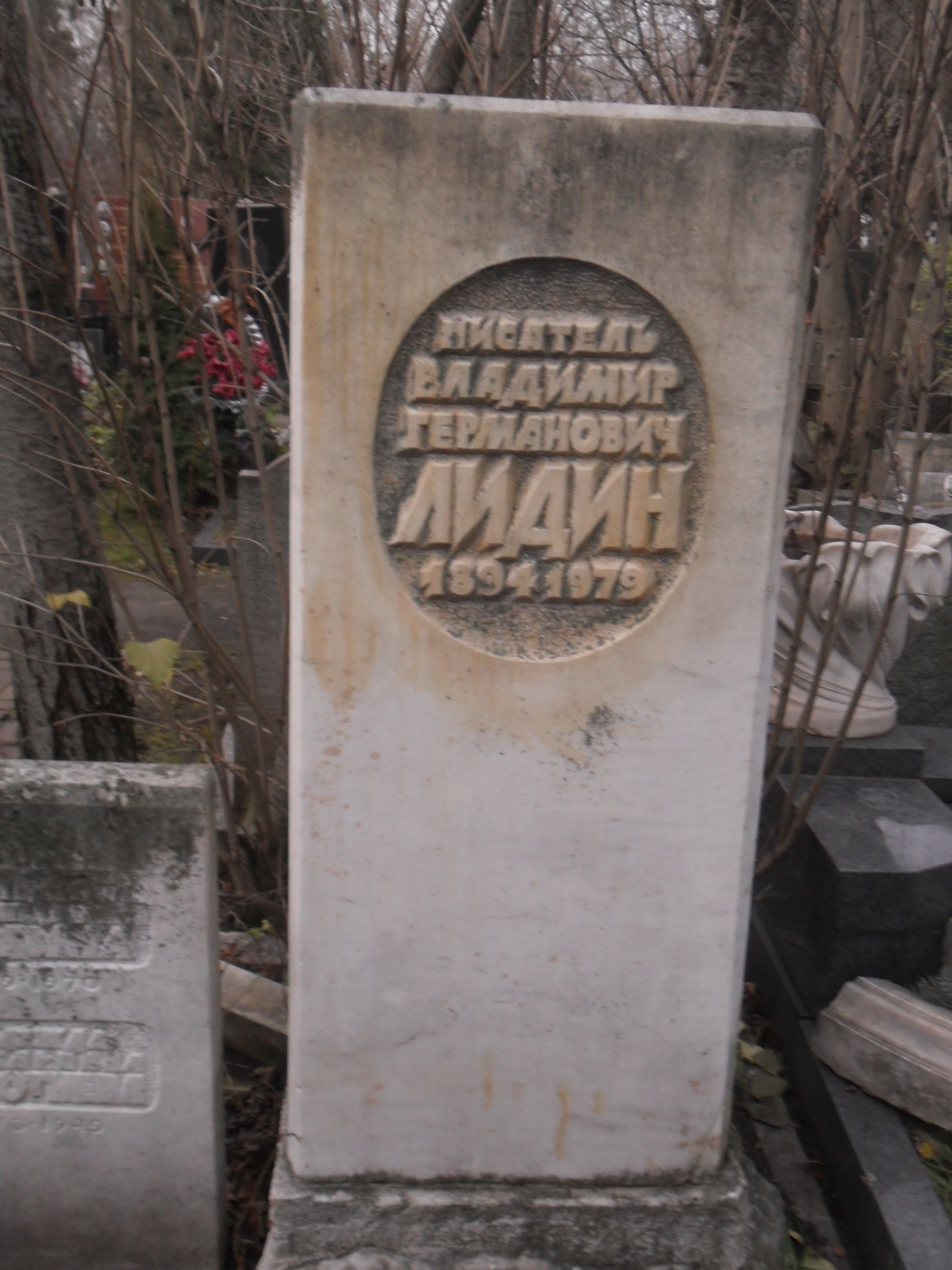
Lidin's grave in the Novodevichy Cemetery, Moscow

=== Short story collections ===
- Nothing Matters (1916)
- Black Horses (1916)
- Flooding Waters (1917)
- Daily Humdrum (1923)
- Tales of Many Days (1923)
- North (1925)
- Stories of the Year 1920 (1925)
- Collected Works (1928 - 1930)
- The Birds Came: Stories of 1954–1961 (1970)

=== Novels ===
- The Going Ships (1927)
- The Apostate (1931)
- Tomb of the Unknown Soldier (1932)
- Son (1936)
- Two Lives (1950)

=== Non-fiction ===
- Roads and Mileage (1927)
- Exile (1947)
- People and Meetings (1957)
