= John Charteris =

British brigadier general (1877–1946)

Brigadier-General John Charteris CMG DSO
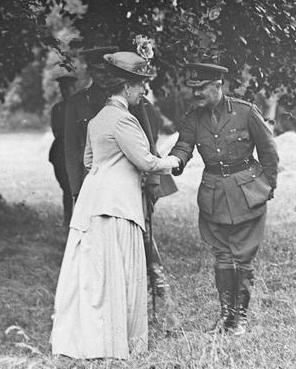
- Charteris being presented to Queen Mary in 1917
- Born: 8 January 1877; Glasgow, Scotland
- Died: 4 February 1946 (aged 69); Surrey, England
- Military career
- Allegiance: United Kingdom
- Branch: British Army
- Service years: 1893–1922
- Rank: Brigadier-General
- Conflicts: First World War
- Awards: Companion of the Order of St Michael and St George; Distinguished Service Order; Mentioned in Despatches; Commander of the Order of the Crown (Belgium); Croix de Guerre (Belgium); Knight of the Legion of Honour (France); Order of the Rising Sun, 3rd Class (Japan); Army Distinguished Service Medal (United States)

Brigadier-General John Charteris, CMG, DSO (8 January 1877 – 4 February 1946) was a British Army officer. During the First World War, he was the Chief of Intelligence at the British Expeditionary Force General Headquarters from 1915 to 1918. In later life he was a Unionist Party Member of Parliament for Dumfriesshire.

== Early life ==
Charteris was born on 8 January 1877, probably in Glasgow, son of Matthew Charteris, Regius Professor of Materia Medica at the University of Glasgow, and Elizabeth Gilchrist (née Greer). He was from a distinguished academic family. His uncle was Archibald Hamilton Charteris, Professor of Liberal Criticism at the University of Edinburgh and Moderator of the General Assembly of the Church of Scotland (1892). His older brother, also called Archibald Hamilton Charteris, was Professor of International Law at the University of Sydney, and was suspected with the other brother, Francis James Charteris, Professor of Materia Medica at the University of St Andrews of the murder of Marion Gilchrist in 1908 .

Charteris received his early formal education at Kelvinside Academy from 1886 to 1891, then spent a year studying mathematics and physics at Göttingen University in Germany. He was fluent in the French and German languages.

== Early military career ==
Charteris entered the Royal Military Academy, Woolwich, in December 1893, and on graduating received a commission into the Royal Engineers in March 1896, and was sent to Asia, where he joined the British Indian Army. He entered Staff College, Quetta, in 1907, and was the outstanding graduate of his year in 1909. Major-General Douglas Haig, then Chief of Staff India, became his patron.

Charteris was a staff captain at India HQ in 1909–10, then in 1910–12 was GSO2 on the Operations Section of the Indian General Staff. When Haig was appointed to Corps Command at Aldershot in 1912, as Assistant Military Secretary Captain Charteris was one of the trusted officers who found a place in his retinue.

== First World War ==
In August 1914, on the outbreak of the First World War, whilst still at the junior officer rank of captain, Charteris was appointed an Aide-de-Camp to Haig, whom he accompanied to France with the British Expeditionary Force (BEF). In September 1914 Haig issued him with an order to establish an Intelligence Office in I Corps Headquarters, Haig's command, with the aim of providing operational information on the activities of the Imperial German Army. Despite being fluent in French and German, Charteris had no background or formal training in intelligence work. He remained in Haig's retinue engaged in this work when I Corps was enlarged and converted into the BEF's First Army in December 1914, and then on to the BEF's General Headquarters, when Haig was appointed Commander-in-Chief of the BEF in December 1915, where Charteris was promoted by Haig to the temporary rank of brigadier-general in January 1916 at 38 years of age. Haig also awarded him the Distinguished Service Order for his work on his HQ Staff in 1915.

Charteris was brash, untidy, and liked to start the day with a brandy and soda. He was a sort of licensed jester (known as "The Principal Boy" due to his rapid promotion) amidst Haig's staid inner circle. In Walter Reid's view he comes across as likeable and able in his own writings, including his letters to his much younger wife Noel (the "Douglas" frequently referred to in his letters is their infant son). He is cited by the Quote Investigator as the source for the saying "Military Intelligence is a contradiction in terms", in his 1931 memoir At G.H.Q.

Haig's chaplain George S. Duncan later commented on how Charteris's "vitality and loud-mouthed exuberance" made him unpopular. Lord Derby, then Secretary of State for War, began to have doubts about Charteris in the role as the BEF's Intelligence Chief after an incident in February 1917 when he failed to censor an interview given by Haig to French journalists.

Charteris was sometimes described as Haig's "evil counsellor", and has been blamed by some historians for Haig's errors, with the accusation that he had a propensity in intelligence briefings to provide assessments of the German situation that gave Haig what he wanted to hear. He produced reports of poor German morale based on interviews with prisoners, and of German manpower shortages based on statistical analysis of their paybooks, which gave a German soldier's age and year of callup. These reports were influential in Haig's decisions affecting the conduct of military campaigns, and were increasingly criticised by Major-General George Macdonogh, intelligence advisor at the War Office. Haig kept him on after his inadequacies had been exposed.

However, the historian John Bourne has stated that Charteris was methodical and hardworking. Herbert Lawrence, who became the BEF's Chief of Intelligence briefly in early 1918, testified to the efficiency of the organisation he inherited from Charteris when he replaced him after his dismissal. Bourne argues that although Charteris was wrong about the wider issues of German morale and manpower, he was effective at predicting enemy troop deployments, immediate plans and tactical changes. In Bourne's view, he was not Haig's "evil genius", but rather shared Haig's innate optimism and did nothing to undermine it.

An official inquiry blamed intelligence failures by Charteris's Department for the near debacle at the Battle of Cambrai, where a German counter-attack had retaken almost all the British gains. By the end of 1917 Charteris was known as "the U-boat". In January 1918 Brigadier-General Edgar William Cox was recalled to France to replace Charteris. Charteris's final intelligence reports correctly predicted a German offensive in spring 1918. Charteris, who in January 1917 was promoted to brevet colonel, was moved to the job of deputy director of Transportation at GHQ. He relinquished this position, and his temporary brigadier general's rank, in September 1918.

== Propaganda ==
Charteris was also associated with some notable allied propaganda and disinformation successes, such as "the master hoax" of World War I, being the story of the existence of a German corpse factory Kadaververwertungsanstalt, in which the Germans supposedly rendered their own dead soldiers into fats. This story was circulated in several British and international newspapers in 1917. After the war Charteris allegedly claimed in a public speech that he invented it when he deliberately switched captions on two German war pictures: one image showed soldiers killed in battle being taken away for burial, while the other showed horse carcasses being delivered to a processing factory behind German lines. One of his subordinates created a fake diary describing the use of the factory. This was to have been planted on the corpse of a German soldier, to be "found" as proof of the story, but this plan was eventually dropped. Charteris's comments caused a media outcry. Phillip Knightley says that all the evidence suggests that the story originated in newspaper reports about a real factory for rendering animal corpses. Charteris may have concocted the claim that he invented it in order to impress his audience, not realizing a reporter was present. Randal Marlin has written that Charteris's claim to have invented the story is "demonstrably false" in a number of details. However, it is possible that a fake diary was created but never used. Nevertheless, this fake diary, which Charteris claimed still existed when he made the comments has never been found. In fact Charteris's comments later gave Adolf Hitler rhetorical ammunition to portray the British as liars.

== Post-war military career ==
Charteris was appointed a Companion of the Order of St Michael and St George in 1919. He served as Director of Movements and Quartering in India from 1920 to 1921, then as Deputy Adjutant- and Quartermaster-General of Eastern Command from 1921 to 1922.

== Political career ==
Charteris left the army, retiring on an Indian pension and being granted the honorary rank of brigadier general on 27 December 1922.

From 1924 until 1929 he was Unionist Party Member of Parliament for Dumfriesshire. His areas of political interest were in farming and the welfare of British war veterans.

== Publications ==
Charteris published three books in his later years concerning his military service, 'Field Marshal Earl Haig' (1929), 'At GHQ' (1931), and "Haig" (1933) (a condensed version of the 1929 biography). His writings were considered controversial. He had not kept a diary at the time so 'At GHQ' consisted of papers, notes and letters from the time re-written into diary form. He confessed to sometimes amplifying from memory but by and large the reconstructed "diary" is consistent with records which he kept at the time, e.g. his entry for the First Day of the Somme which he states was "not an attempt to win the war at a blow", and that "weeks of hard fighting" lay ahead.

At GHQ also contains a letter from Charteris with the date 5 September 1914, noting that "the story of the Angels of Mons [is] going strong through the 2nd Corps". If authentic, this may be the earliest account of the rumour, predating Arthur Machen's The Bowmen—widely held to be the source of the Angels of Mons legend. However, examination of Charteris's original letters gives evidence that these entries or dates were falsified, leading David Clarke, among others, to suggest that Charteris was using the Angels rumour for propaganda purposes.

== Personal life ==
Charteris married Noel Hodgson in October 1913. They had three sons, all of whom became officers in the British Army (one of them, Euan, was killed in the North African Campaign during the Second World War on 3 December 1942 with the 2nd Battalion, Parachute Regiment).

Charteris died at the age of 69 on 4 February 1946 at his home, 'Bourne House', in the village of Thorpe, in the county of Surrey. His body was buried in the graveyard of Tinwald Kirk (Church), in Dumfries and Galloway, which also displays a memorial stained glass window to his memory.

His will was valued for probate at £6,895 4s 11d (around £360,000 at 2024 prices).

== Sources ==
- Matthew, Colin (2004). Dictionary of National Biography. Vol. 11. Oxford: Oxford University Press. ISBN 978-0198614111., essay on Charteris written by John Bourne.
- AIM25: Liddell Hart Centre for Military Archives, King's College London: CHARTERIS, Brig Gen John (1877-1946) at www.aim25.ac.uk
- Reid, Walter (2006). Architect of Victory: Douglas Haig. Birlinn Ltd, Edinburgh. ISBN 1-84158-517-3.

Parliament of the United Kingdom
Preceded by William Allan Chapple	Member of Parliament for Dumfriesshire; 1924–1929	Succeeded by Joseph Hunter
