= George Carstairs (missionary) =

Scottish missionary

George Carstairs (1880–1948) was a Church of Scotland minister and missionary in India. In later life he was editor of Life and Work.

== Life ==
He was born in Glasgow on 11 February 1880, the son of the Rev. George Lindley Carstairs of the United Presbyterian Church, ordained in 1871; and a younger brother of the accountant Alexander Morrison Carstairs (died 1943). In 1883, his father with David Corsar travelled to South Africa to report on the Church's missions there. He was educated at Albany Academy, and graduated M.A. from Glasgow University in 1901.

Joining the Rajputana Mission established in the 1860s, geographically roughly corresponding to the modern Indian state of Rajasthan, Carstairs came under the Foreign Mission Committee of the Church of Scotland. He was appointed to Alwar in 1907, where he was an educational reformed in the mission school. In 1924, Carstairs addressed Girl Guides from Nasirabad. In 1927, in the Glasgow University records, he was B.D. and resident in Beawar. He took part in the mission for around 30 years, with a break at the end of the 1920s.

Back in Scotland, in Edinburgh Carstairs resided at 22 Braid Crescent. He edited Life and Work, the Church of Scotland magazine. He also became a staff correspondent for The Christian Century. He died on 26 April 1948.

== Awards and honours ==
Carstairs was awarded a D.D. by Glasgow University in 1935, and the Kaisar-i-Hind Medal.

== Works ==
- Shepherd of Udaipur and the Land He Loved (1926), biography of James Shepherd. Shepherd was head of the medical mission in Udaipur State from 1877.
- The Hindu: A Brief Sketch of the Social & Religious Progress of India (1929)

== Family ==
Carstairs married Elizabeth Huntley Young. Their children included:

- Charles Young Carstairs (1910–1993), civil servant in the Colonial Office.
- Andrew McLaren Carstairs (1914–1990), historian.
- George Morrison Carstairs (1916–1991), born in Mussoorie.

Elizabeth was sister to the Rev. R. C. Young of Jamaica. This was the Presbyterian missionary to Jamaica, Robert Comingo Young (1882–1946), a graduate of Glasgow University in 1903 (middle name given as Comings). He arrived in the Cayman Islands in 1908 from Scotland, where he married Olga Parsons, a local woman, before moving to Jamaica around 1913; the art historian Andrew McLaren Young was their son.
