= Life and Work (magazine) =

Church of Scotland magazine

Life and Work - church of Scotland magazine 1900

Life and Work was the editorially independent monthly magazine of the Church of Scotland. Beginning in January 1879, its last publication was in August 2025.

== History ==
Life and Work was founded in January 1879 by Archibald Hamilton Charteris. It was an initiative of the Church's Committee of Christian Life and Work, which was led by Charteris, a professor of biblical criticism at Edinburgh University who was also founder of the Woman's Guild.

In its early years, Life and Work ran various supplements, including the Guild supplement and the Young Men's Supplement. Of these, only the Gaelic supplement is still running.

It incorporated the Mission Record of the Church of Scotland from 1900, and at the 1929 union of the Church, it merged with United Free Church's The Record as Life and Work: The Record of the Church of Scotland.

At its height, the magazine was read by around a quarter of the Scottish population, reflecting the high point of membership within the denomination, and broader allegiance to the Christian faith within Scotland.

== More recent developments ==
The magazine described life and work of the Church of Scotland and a subjects that might interest others within the denomination. This included international and British political and social issues and other topical and ethical subjects. There were book reviews, features about the church, reflections and devotional elements.

Life and Work was voted best Member Magazine of the Year at the PPA Scottish magazine awards in 2004, and nominated numerous times subsequently. It also received a prestigious Andrew Cross award in 2005 from the UK-wide Churches Media Council.

In January 2007 the magazine reverted, during a full colour relaunch, to 1940s’ title Life and Work, compared with its original title Life & Work. In addition, it dropped the subtitle of "The Record of the Church of Scotland."

In April 2013 a Life and Work website was launched, including extracts from the magazine as well as additional news and features. A digital version of the magazine became available online from 2017.

== Closure ==
Between 2008 and 2020, Life and Work contributed surpluses of more than £979,000 to the wider finances of the Church of Scotland.

However, these profits dried up after 2020 as the magazine switched from being “a standalone business generating surplus income” into an operation that “now requires significant investment year on year from central funds to underwrite its production”.

The overall circulation of Life and Work in December 2024 was 6,328: this consisted of 5,162 print and 554 digital sales, along with 612 "promotional" digital copies sent to parish ministers and parish magazine editors.

The 2025 General Assembly of the Church of Scotland agreed to end publication of Life and Work before the end of 2025.

It was agreed that proposals should be brought to the 2026 Assembly regarding the creation of a new successor publication which would remain “editorially independent”. However, in an article about her experience as the first permanent female editor of the magazine (2000-02), the journalist Rosemary Goring suggested that this much-talked about editorial independence was “meaningless”, given that her final issue was pulped in its entirety because of concerns about a single article it contained.

The final issue of Life and Work was a commemorative edition, published in August 2025.

== Gaelic supplement ==
Life and Work had a 4-page Gaelic supplement, Na Duilleagan Gàidhlig, established in January 1880, which was included on request, and is available online. No Gaelic periodical has lasted as long as the Life and Work's Gaelic edition. In its first 100 years, there were only four editors.

=== Gaelic supplement editors ===
- (1880-1887) Rev Archibald Clerk, from Lorn, who was minister of Kilmallie.
- (1887-1907) Rev John MacRury, minister of Snizort and Uig in Skye, a native of Benbecula
- (1907-1951) Rev Donald Lamont, minister of Glen Urquhart, then Blair Atholl. A native of Tiree
- (1951-1980) Rev T M Murchison, minister of St Columba-Copland Road Church, later St Columba-Summerton Church, Glasgow. A native of Glasgow, but grew up in Skye.
- (1980-2017), Rev Dr Roderick MacLeod, minister of Bernera, and later minister of Cumlodden, Lochfyneside and Lochgair. A native of North Uist.
- From 2017, the title was edited by a volunteer team, led by Duncan Sneddon.

== List of editors ==
The magazine has had 14 editors in its history, as well as two Acting editors.

- 1879: Archibald Hamilton Charteris
- 1880–98: Rev John McMurtrie
- 1898–1902: Rev Archibald Fleming
- 1902–25: Rev Robert Howie Fisher
- 1925–30: Rev Harry Smith
- 1929–34: William Pringle Livingstone
- 1935–45: Rev George Carstairs
- 1945–65: Rev John Wright Stevenson
- 1965–72: Rev Leonard John Armstrong Bell
- 1972–91: Robert Deans Kernohan
- 1991–94: Peter B. Macdonald
- 1994–99: Dr Robin Hill (later Reverend)
- 1999 & 2008-09: Muriel Armstrong, acting editor
- 2000–02: Rosemary Goring
- 2002: Harry Reid, acting editor
- 2002 - Aug 2025: Lynne McNeil

== See also ==
- Church of Scotland Yearbook

== References and further reading ==
- R D Kernohan, Scotland's Life and Work, St. Andrew Press, Edinburgh, 1979. ISBN 0-7152-0421-1
- Life and Work website
- Life and Work at the Church of Scotland website
