= Jim Sheppard (disambiguation) =

Jim Sheppard (born 1963) is an American bassist.

James or Jim Sheppard may also refer to:

- James Sheppard (MP) (1681–1730), British politician
- James Edgar Sheppard (1845–1921), Canon of Windsor
- James Sheppard (cricketer) (1888-1944), Australian cricketer
- James O. Sheppard (1890–1973), American politician, lieutenant governor of South Carolina
- James Sheppard (born c. 1940), American musician singing in Shep and the Limelites
- James Sheppard (born 1988), Canadian hockey player
- A character in the novel The Murder of Roger Ackroyd
- Jim Sheppard (stuntman), stuntman killed in a 1977 horse-related accident, while taking part in the filming of the Western drama film Comes a Horseman (1978).

== See also ==
- Jim Shepard (born 1956), American writer
- James E. Shepard (1875–1947), American educator
- James E. Shepherd (1847–1910), American jurist
- James Shepherd (disambiguation)
