= Matthew Charteris =

Scottish physician and academic (1840–1897)

- Born: 1840; Newton Wamphray, Scotland
- Died: July 1897 (aged 56–57); Glasgow, Scotland
- Children: 3, including John
- Relatives: Archibald Charteris (brother)

Academic background
- Education: University of Edinburgh (MD)

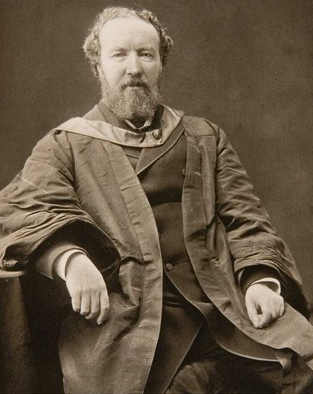
Prof Matthew Charteris

Matthew Charteris MD FRSE LRCSE (1840 – July 1897) was a Scottish physician and academic who was the Regius Professor of Materia Medica at the University of Glasgow. He was also the author of the standard medical textbook the Practice of Medicine. He was an advocate of the influence of good climate upon health.

== Early life and education ==
Charteris was born in Newton Wamphray in Dumfriesshire in 1840, the son of John Charteris, the local schoolmaster, and his wife, Jean (Jane) Hamilton, daughter of Archibald Hamilton, a farmer at Broomhills. He was educated by his father at Wamphray Parish School before winning a place at the University of Edinburgh to study medicine. He graduated as a Doctor of Medicine in 1863.

== Career ==
After some further study in foreign schools, Charteris established a medical practice in Airdrie before moving to Glasgow. From 1874 he worked at Glasgow Royal Infirmary and from 1876 was a professor of medicine at the Anderson Institute in Glasgow. From 1880 to 1897 he was Professor of Materia Medica and Therapeutics at the University of Glasgow. He lived nearby at 3 Kirklee Gardens in Kelvinside.

He was elected a Fellow of the Royal Society of Edinburgh in 1896, his proposers being Patrick Heron Watson and John Batty Tuke. His photograph is held by the National Portrait Gallery in London.

== Personal life ==
Charteris was the younger brother of Archibald Charteris, theologian and founder of the Woman's Guild. He and his wife, Elizabeth Greer, had three sons: Archibald Hamilton Charteris (1874–1940) who was implicated in the Marion Gilchrist murder and Oscar Slater scandal, Francis Charteris (1875–1964), likewise suspected of murder, and John Charteris (1877–1946) a senior intelligence officer in World War I.

In the 1890s he was living at 3 Kirklee Gardens in the Kelvinside district.

After a prolonged illness he died of influenza on 7 June 1897 in Comrie. He is buried with his parents in Wamphray churchyard.

== Publications ==
- The Student's Guide to the Practice of Medicine (1881)
- Practice of Medicine (1888 plus further editions)
