= List of listed buildings in Keithhall and Kinkell, Aberdeenshire =

This is a list of listed buildings in the parish of Keithhall and Kinkell in Aberdeenshire, Scotland.

== List ==
Name	Location	Date Listed	Grid Ref. (Note: Sometimes known as OSGB36, the grid reference (where provided) is based on the British national grid reference system used by the Ordnance Survey. • "Guide to National Grid". Ordnance Survey. • "Get-a-map". Ordnance Survey.)	Geo-coordinates	Notes	LB Number (Note: Historic Environment Scotland assign a unique alphanumeric identifier to each designated site in Scotland, for listed buildings this always begins with "LB", for example "LB12345".)	Image
Keith Hall Home Farm				57°17′03″N 2°20′56″W	Category B	45612	Upload Photo
Kinkell Church (St Michael's) Lower Kinkell				57°15′42″N 2°21′24″W	Category B	9139	Upload Photo
Keith Hall Gardeners Cottage, Including Bothy/Shed				57°17′09″N 2°21′08″W	Category C(S)	45607	Upload Photo
Keith Hall Former Stables And Coach House				57°16′57″N 2°21′17″W	Category B	45609	Upload Photo
Keith Hall				57°16′51″N 2°21′12″W	Category A	9136	Upload Photo
Balbithan House				57°15′37″N 2°18′47″W	Category A	9140	Upload Photo
Keith Hall Home Farm Cottages				57°17′09″N 2°20′46″W	Category C(S)	45613	Upload Photo
Friend's Meeting House And Friend's Cottage Kinmuck				57°16′10″N 2°18′25″W	Category B	9141	Upload Photo
Keith Hall Road Bridge At North Drive				57°17′23″N 2°21′45″W	Category C(S)	45614	Upload Photo
Keith Hall Walled Garden And Garden Cottage				57°17′08″N 2°21′11″W	Category B	45606	Upload Photo
Keith Hall Ice House				57°16′44″N 2°21′03″W	Category C(S)	45608	Upload Photo
Keith Hall North Lodge, Including Gates, Gatepiers And Adjoining Walls				57°17′27″N 2°21′52″W	Category C(S)	45610	Upload Photo
Keith Hall East Lodge				57°16′54″N 2°20′22″W	Category C(S)	45611	Upload Photo
South Lodge Keith Hall				57°16′30″N 2°21′34″W	Category B	9137	Upload Photo
Keithhall And Kinkell Parish Church				57°16′44″N 2°19′48″W	Category B	9135	Upload Photo
Bridge Over River Urie, Keithhall Road				57°17′49″N 2°23′18″W	Category B	9138	Upload Photo

== Key ==
The scheme for classifying buildings in Scotland is:

- Category A: "buildings of national or international importance, either architectural or historic; or fine, little-altered examples of some particular period, style or building type."
- Category B: "buildings of regional or more than local importance; or major examples of some particular period, style or building type, which may have been altered."
- Category C: "buildings of local importance; lesser examples of any period, style, or building type, as originally constructed or moderately altered; and simple traditional buildings which group well with other listed buildings."

In March 2016 there were 47,288 listed buildings in Scotland. Of these, 8% were Category A, and 50% were Category B, with the remaining 42% being Category C.

== See also ==
- List of listed buildings in Aberdeenshire
