= Newton Wamphray =

Coordinates: 55.240°N 3.396°W

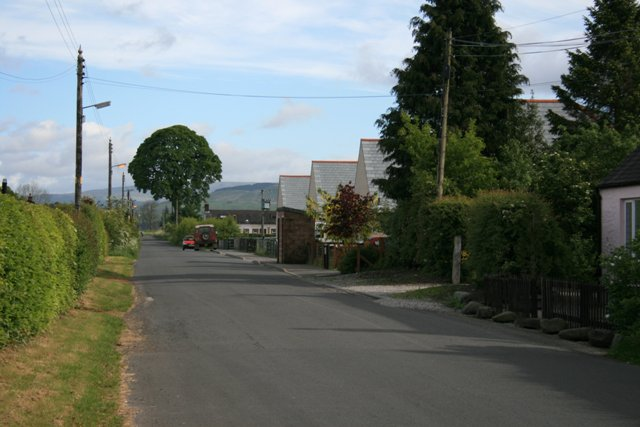
- Houses in Newton Wamphray

- Location within Dumfries and Galloway
- OS grid reference: NY120961
- Council area: Dumfries and Galloway
- Lieutenancy area: Dumfriesshire
- Country: Scotland
- Sovereign state: United Kingdom
- Post town: MOFFAT
- Postcode district: DG10
- Dialling code: 01683
- Police: Scotland
- Fire: Scottish
- Ambulance: Scottish
- UK Parliament: Dumfriesshire, Clydesdale and Tweeddale
- Scottish Parliament: Dumfriesshire

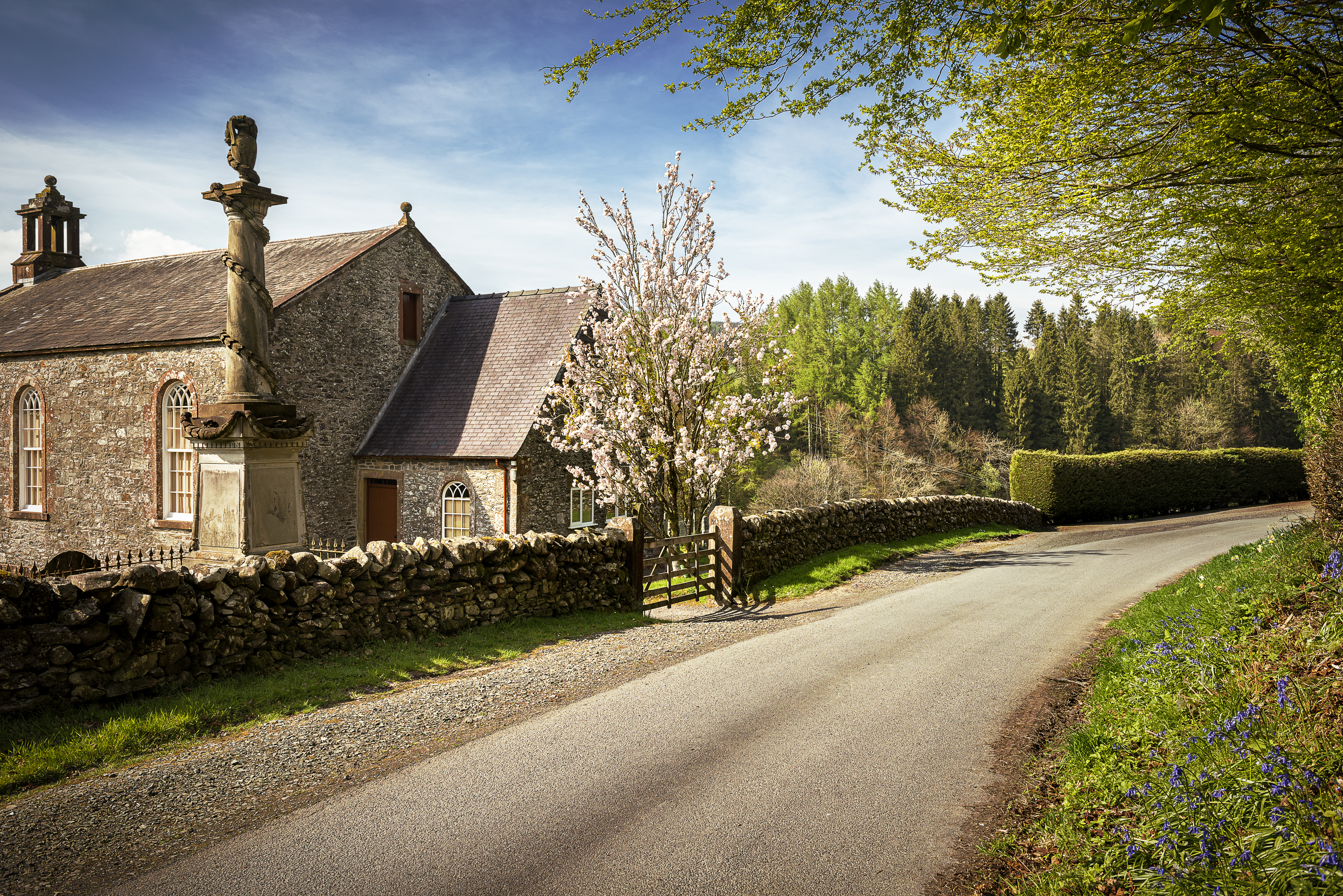
Wamphray Parish Church

Newton Wamphray is a village in Dumfries and Galloway. Wamphray is the name of the surrounding parish and of the Wamphray Water, which flows south-west through the Wamphray Glen to join the River Annan near the small village, or hamlet, of Newton.

== History ==
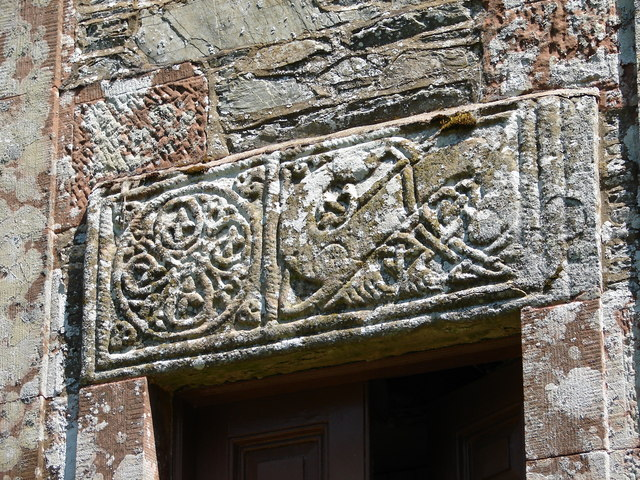
Cross-shaft, now re-used as a lintel in Wamphray Church

The village is near the A74(M) motorway, near Annandale Water, roughly halfway between Moffat and Lockerbie, and has for centuries been close to the direct Glasgow to Carlisle route, which around 1776 was made into a turnpike road suitable for mail coaches travelling between England and Glasgow. Newton is on the main railway line south from Glasgow, and from about 1847 had its own station called Wamphray, but this closed in the 1960s.

Newton Wamphray primary school has been closed for several years, local children generally go to primary school in Lockerbie. The old school building now lies largely abandoned while the nature of its ownership is investigated. The old manse near the 1834 church has become a hotel; the historic church has been used for regular services over the past few years. In 2026 Wamphray Church will be placed on the open market by the Church of Scotland, one of many properties it is selling off due to falling congregations.

There are various historic and pre-historic sites near Newton Wamphray, including standing stones and the remains of a motte-and-bailey. A feud between local reiving families in the 16th century is remembered in the ballad, The Lads of Wamphray.

One of the more prominent local residents was John Brown of Wamphray, or "John Broun of Wamfrey", a Church of Scotland theologian who served as the minister of the local parish during the mid-17th century. He removed to Wamphray to begin serving the parish at an unknown date (estimates vary from 1637 until 1655) and remained in residence until 1662, when he was imprisoned and later exiled to the Netherlands for his public opposition to the royal imposition of bishops on the Church.

Before the 20th century the village was sometimes called Newton, or Newtoun, of Wamphray, and described as being in Annandale. Newton suggests "new village or farmstead", a placename derived from Old English niwe (new) + tun (farm). Scots toun meant a farm settlement before it came to mean a 'town'. The etymology of Wamphray is uncertain; some suggestions link 'Wam' to Gaelic Uamh (cave). Older spellings include Wamfry or Wamfray.

== Governance ==
Newton Wamphray is in the parliamentary constituency of Dumfriesshire, Clydesdale and Tweeddale, David Mundell is the current Conservative Party member of parliament.

It is part of the South Scotland region in the Scottish Parliament, being in the constituency of Dumfriesshire. Oliver Mundell of the Conservatives is the MSP.

Before Brexit, for the European Parliament its residents voted to elect MEP's for the Scotland constituency.

== Notable residents ==
- Richard Bell (Arabist) (1876–1952)
- Prof Archibald Charteris (1835-1908), a Moderator of the General Assembly of the Church of Scotland
- Prof Matthew Charteris (1840-1897)
- Very Rev John Gillespie (1836-1912)
- John Rogerson (22 October 1741 – 21 December 1823), physician at the court of Catherine the Great of Russia.
- Rev Dr James Williamson, parish minister 1755 to 1757

== See also ==
- List of listed buildings in Wamphray, Dumfries and Galloway
- List of places in Dumfries and Galloway

== Sources ==
- Statistical Accounts of Scotland
- Great Britain Historical GIS Project: Wamphray
- Dictionary of Scots Language: toun
