= John Gillespie (moderator) =

Scottish minister

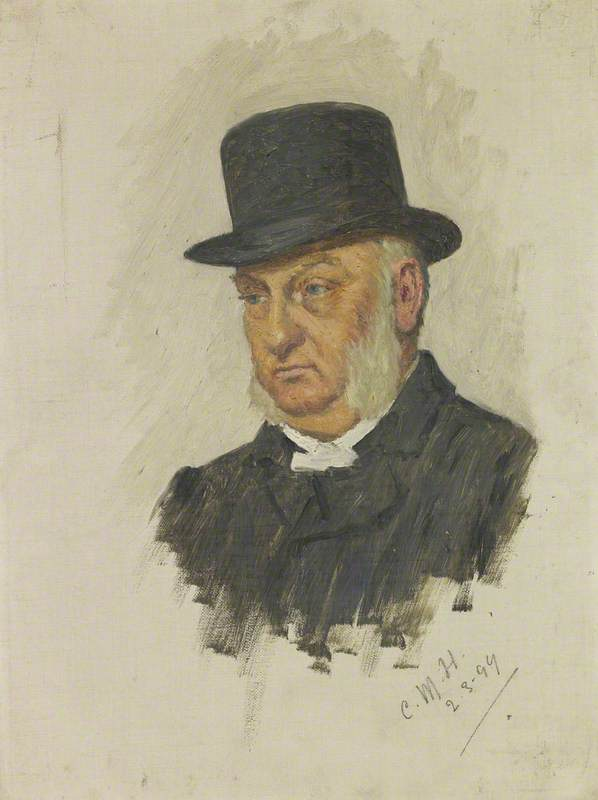
Dr John Gillespie

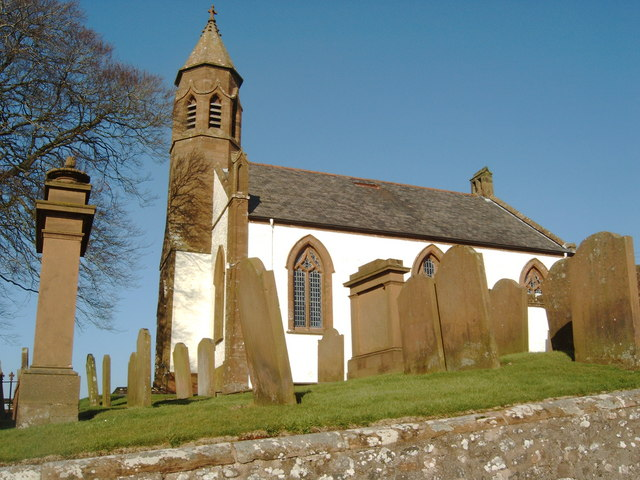
Mouswald Parish Church

John Gillespie (1836–1912) was a Scottish minister who served as Moderator of the General Assembly of the Church of Scotland in 1903.

== Life ==
Gillespie was born in Johnstone by Lockerbie in 1836, the third son of Margaret Johnstone and her husband, James Gillespie, who farmed at Annanbank, Johnstone. He was educated at Newton Wamphray. After obtaining a Masters in Divinity in Glasgow, he served the parish of Mouswald in Dumfriesshire as a minister of the Church of Scotland from 1865 to 1912. The Gillespie Memorial Hall in Mouswald is named after him. From 1892, Gillespie represented Mouswald as a county councillor for Dumfriesshire.

A keen supporter of the local farmers, Gillespie was nicknamed the "Minister for Agriculture". He was Secretary of the Galloway Cattle Society and endowed a silver cup at the Royal Highland Show for best Galloway cattle.

== Family ==
In 1868 he married Jessie K C Patrick of Dalry, Ayrshire (b.1846). They had five daughters, Margaret J (1871), Elizabeth L C (1874). Jessie P (1877), Mary R T (1887).

== Publications ==
- The Humours of Scottish Life (1904)
