= List of listed buildings in Wamphray, Dumfries and Galloway =

This is a list of listed buildings in the civil parish of Wamphray in Dumfries and Galloway, Scotland.

== List ==
| Name | Location | Date listed | Grid ref. (Note: Sometimes known as OSGB36, the grid reference (where provided) is based on the British national grid reference system used by the Ordnance Survey. • "Guide to National Grid". Ordnance Survey. • "Get-a-map". Ordnance Survey.) | Geo-coordinates | Notes | LB number (Note: Historic Environment Scotland assign a unique alphanumeric identifier to each designated site in Scotland, for listed buildings this always begins with "LB", for example "LB12345".) | Image |
|---|---|---|---|---|---|---|---|
| Stenrieshill Farmhouse, Steading and Horsemill and Gatepiers | | | | 55°16′00″N 3°24′08″W | Category B | 16788 | Upload Photo |
| Wamphray Parish Hall (Former UP Church) | | | | 55°14′14″N 3°23′52″W | Category B | 16796 | Upload Photo |
| Wamphray School and Schoolhouse | | | | 55°14′56″N 3°23′13″W | Category B | 16798 | Upload Photo |
| Laverhay Farmhouse and Steading | | | | 55°16′09″N 3°21′19″W | Category C(S) | 16794 | Upload Photo |
| Wamphray Parish Church and Churchyard | | | | 55°15′17″N 3°22′09″W | Category B | 16799 | Upload another image |
| Wamphray Mill | | | | 55°15′19″N 3°22′14″W | Category B | 16779 | Upload Photo |
| Girthead Farmhouse | | | | 55°13′26″N 3°24′08″W | Category B | 16793 | Upload Photo |
| Wamphray, The Manse (Formerly Wamphray UP manse) | | | | 55°14′15″N 3°23′51″W | Category C(S) | 16797 | Upload Photo |
| Bridgend | | | | 55°15′06″N 3°23′05″W | Category B | 16792 | Upload Photo |
| Wamphray Bridge over Wamphray Water (at Wamphray Gate) | | | | 55°15′05″N 3°23′07″W | Category B | 16795 | Upload Photo |
| Wamphraygate Farmhouse | | | | 55°15′03″N 3°23′02″W | Category C(S) | 16800 | Upload Photo |

== Key ==
The scheme for classifying buildings in Scotland is:

- Category A: "buildings of national or international importance, either architectural or historic; or fine, little-altered examples of some particular period, style or building type."
- Category B: "buildings of regional or more than local importance; or major examples of some particular period, style or building type, which may have been altered."
- Category C: "buildings of local importance; lesser examples of any period, style, or building type, as originally constructed or moderately altered; and simple traditional buildings which group well with other listed buildings."

In March 2016 there were 47,288 listed buildings in Scotland. Of these, 8% were Category A, and 50% were Category B, with the remaining 42% being Category C.
