= Mouswald =

Coordinates: 55°02′N 3°28′W

Mouswald: Scottish Gaelic: Mosailt
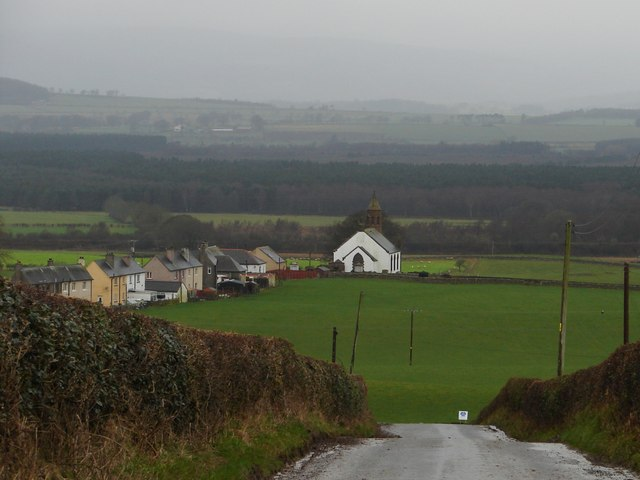
- Population: 284
- OS grid reference: NY066727
  - Edinburgh: 78 mi (126 km)
  - London: 329 mi (529 km)
- Lieutenancy area: Dumfriesshire
- Country: Scotland
- Sovereign state: United Kingdom
- Post town: Dumfries
- Postcode district: DG1 4
- Dialling code: 01387 830...
- Police: Scotland
- Fire: Scottish
- Ambulance: Scottish
- UK Parliament: Dumfriesshire, Clydesdale and Tweeddale (UK Parliament constituency)
- Scottish Parliament: Dumfriesshire (Scottish Parliament constituency)
- Website: Council website

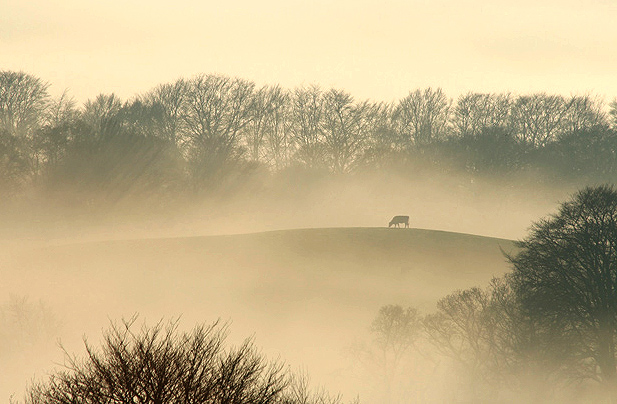
Rural landscape at Mouswald

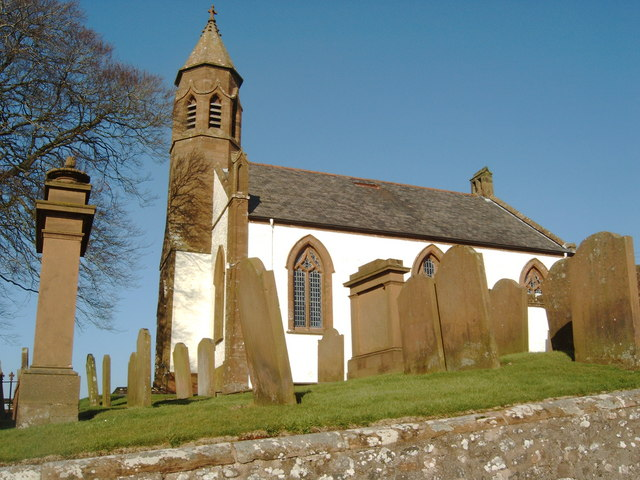
Mouswald Parish Church

Mouswald is a rural village slightly east of Dumfries in south-west Scotland. It lies on the B724 south of the A75. The site views southward over the Solway Firth.

== History ==
A Scandinavian settlement began here in the 9th century and the name Mouswald is said to derive from the Danish mosi vollr, meaning mossy field.

The land belonged to the Clan Carruthers up to the 16th century.

A church existed in the village since at least the 13th century. The current church dates from 1816 but was remodelled by J M Bowie of Dumfries in 1929. It is a category C listed building. The church ceased to be used for worship around 2014 and was subsequently placed on the property market for sale by the Church of Scotland ostensibly for conversion for domestic dwelling. As of 2019, the building remains on the market.

== Notable residents ==
- Very Rev John Gillespie (1834–1912) Moderator of the General Assembly of the Church of Scotland in 1903.
- Rev Henry Duncan (1774–1846) founder of the Trustee Savings Bank (TSB).
- William Grierson (1792–1847), paternal grandfather of Argentine physician Cecilia Grierson.
- Gwen Kirkwood, prolific author of historic romantic novels.
