= The Lads of Wamphray =

Traditional song

The Lads of Wamphray (Roud 4011, Child 184) is an English-language folk ballad, existing only in fragmentary form. According to Walter Scott and others, the ballad concerns a 16th-century feud between reiving families from Wamphray in the Scottish Borders.

== Synopsis ==
The ballad opens with a description of the robberies of the Galiard and Galiard's men before the text breaks off.

When the ballad resumes, the Galiard has taken a horse, but it proves not fast enough; he is captured, and his captors hang him. His nephew sees, raises men, and avenges his death. They return home safely.

== Adaptations ==
Percy Grainger took inspiration from this for his 1905 work The Lads Of Wamphray March, his first composition for wind band.

== See also ==
- List of the Child Ballads

== Sources ==
- Walter Scott, Minstrelsy of the Scottish border (1802)
- C L Johnstone, The Historical Families of Dunfriesshire and the Border Wars (1878)
