= John Rogerson (physician) =

Scottish physician

John Rogerson FRS FRSE
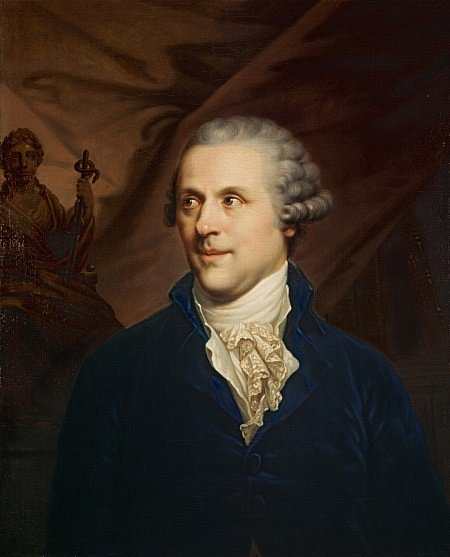
- Portrait by Johann Baptist von Lampi the Elder, c. 1790.

Personal details
- Born: 22 October 1741 Lochbrow Farm, Lochmaben, Dumfriesshire, Scotland
- Died: 21 December 1823 (aged 82) Dumcrieff House, Moffat, Dumfriesshire, Scotland
- Occupation: Physician

John Rogerson (22 October 1741 – 21 December 1823) was a Scottish physician at the court of Catherine the Great of Russia.

== Early life ==
Rogerson was born at Lochbrow Farm near Lochmaben on 22 October 1741, the son of Janet Johnston and Samuel Rogerson, a tenant farmer in Annandale in south-west Scotland.

He was a childhood friend of George Clerk, whose family, the Clerks of Penicuik, had acquired Old Dumcrieff House in 1737. The family had to sell the estate in 1782.

He had a distant relative, James Mounsey, who had a position as physician in the court of Peter the Great. Mounsey returned to Scotland in 1762 and encouraged John to follow a similar, lucrative career. He studied medicine at the University of Edinburgh graduating in 1765.

== Career ==
He sought employment in Russia travelling via Elsinore in Denmark and arriving in Saint Petersburg in 1766. In 1769 he was a doctor in the court of Catherine the Great, and by 1776 he was her personal physician. He was responsible for checking her various lovers for signs of venereal disease. He also acted in a diplomatic role as advisor to the court, being named a secret councillor by Paul I of Russia in 1796.

In 1779 he was elected a Fellow of the Royal Society of London. In 1783 he was one of the few Foreign Founding Fellows of the Royal Society of Edinburgh.

== Retirement and death ==
In 1805 he bought his childhood friend's estate at Dumcrieff near Moffat. The old house was ruinous and he began building a new Dumcrieff House in 1806 (it was not complete until 1820). He bought the large estate at Wamphray in 1810 at a cost of £90,000. He left Saint Petersburg and returned to Scotland in 1816.

He died on 21 December 1823, aged 82, at Dumcrieff House near Moffat in Dumfriesshire, less than five miles from his birthplace. He is buried in Wamphray churchyard.

Rogerson's granddaughter inherited the Dumcrieff estate and married Lord Rollo.
