= Vera Carstairs =

British health statistician (1925–2020)

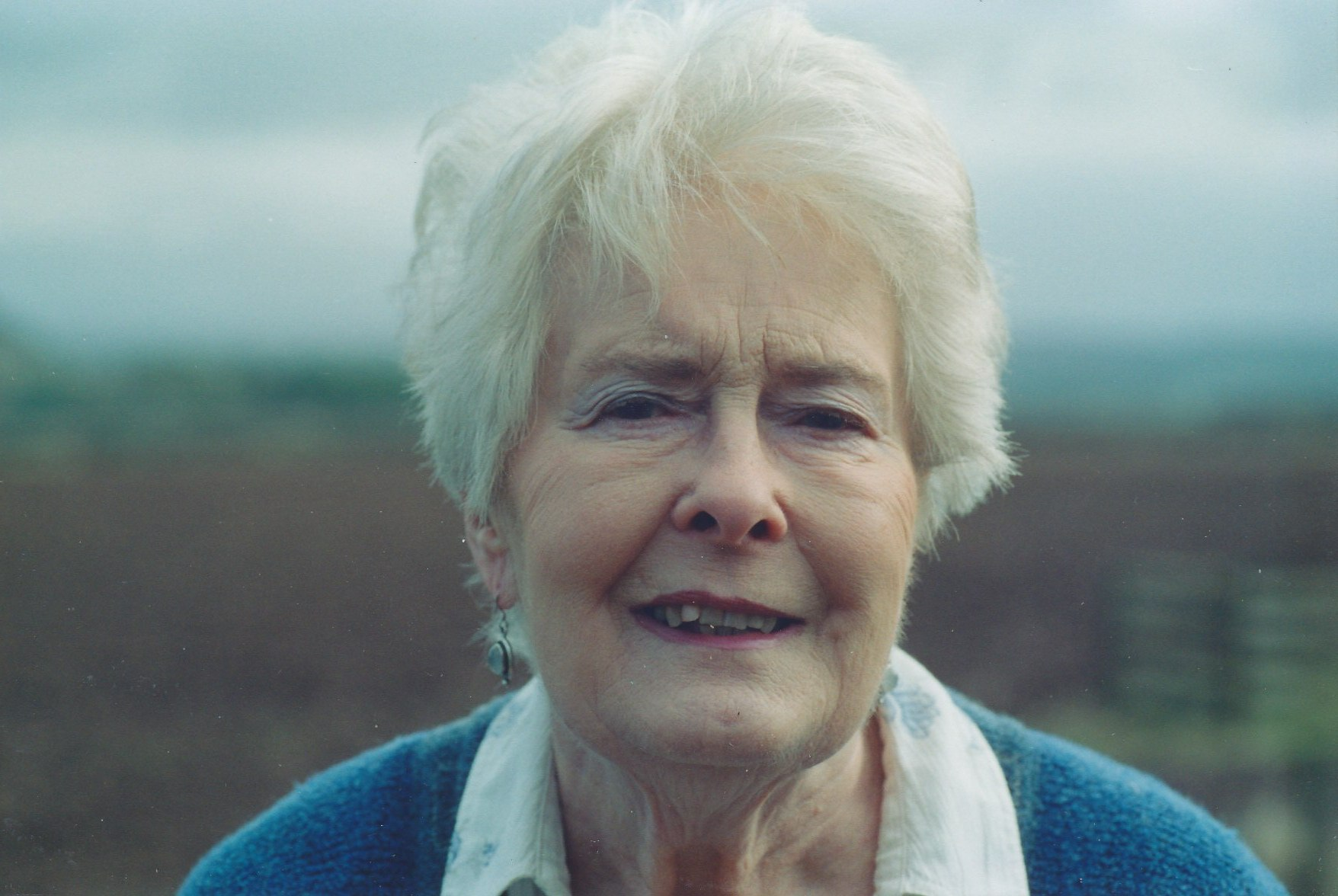
- Carstairs in 1995
- Born: Vera Hunt; 1925; Cheltenham
- Died: 14 December 2020 (aged 94–95)
- Education: University College London; London School of Economics
- Spouse: Morris Carstairs

Vera Dorris Lilian Carstairs (née Hunt, 1925 – 14 December 2020) was a British social scientist noted, in particular, for a groundbreaking 1991 research study (with Russell Morris), Deprivation and Health in Scotland, which related mortality, morbidity and hospital admissions in Scotland, with the social composition and living standards found in Scottish areas. She gives her name to the Carstairs index.

== Personal life ==
Vera Hunt was born in Cheltenham, the daughter of Daniel Hunt and his wife Dorris Hirst, and was brought up in London and Nottingham. She attended the Manning School for Girls, Aspley, leaving in 1941, and working at the Meteorological Office. After World War II she passed a university entrance exam for service personnel. She studied economics, sociology and statistics at University College, London and the London School of Economics, graduating with a B.Sc. degree from University of London in 1949.

She married on 14 December 1950 Morris Carstairs, a physician, psychiatrist and anthropologist who had been brought up in India. The couple moved to Sujarupa, a Hindu hamlet in Rajputana, beginning an anthropological study lasting for 32 years until publication (as The Death of a Witch (1983) under the sole name G. M. Carstairs). In 1951, at "Deoli" (pseudonym) in Rajasthan, Vera was involved in a house-to-house survey, with a member of the panchayat, checking on census results, for research included in her husband's Twice-born: a study of a community of high-caste Hindus (1958).

Morris Carstairs was appointed a senior registrar at Maudsley Hospital, London, in 1953; in 1961 he took a chair of psychological medicine at the University of Edinburgh. The couple had three children. The marriage broke down during the 1970s, ending in divorce. Morris Carstairs later married the academic Nancy Shields Hardin.

== Career ==
Vera Carstairs was employed as a Principal Research Officer for the Scottish Home and Health Department from 1966 to 1975. In later years she was associated with Edinburgh University Medical School, and acted as Scottish health services research network coordinator.

She was chairperson of the Society for Social Medicine and Population Health in 1982, and is on their list of honorary members. In 1995 she was awarded an honorary degree as Doctor of Medicine by the University of Edinburgh. She was also a member of the Social Research Association.

== Work on deprivation ==
In 1981, shortly after a paper Multiple deprivation and health state, Carstairs published a paper on small area analysis in the health context. In 1986 with Lowe she published a further paper on small area analysis. She went on, in work with Russell Morris, to research health in Scotland by postcode sector, leading to a book Deprivation and Heath in Scotland (1990).

At the time of their 1989 joint paper on deprivation, Carstairs was an honorary fellow at The Usher Institute in Edinburgh, where Morris was a research officer. The paper looked at the standardized mortality ratio and excess mortality in areas of Scotland, and then adjusted for area-based deprivation factors.

The Carstairs Deprivation Index, as it is now known, was developed at this period, by substituting in the Townsend index for a factor making allowance for not being a home owner. It was replaced by a variable standing for lower social class. It has been used for surveys on birth weight and health outcomes. As framed in 1991 by Carstairs and Morris, it deals with "goods and services, resources and amenities and of a physical environment which are customary in society", a measure of deprivation being a reflection of difficulty of access to those. Scores reflect a "summary measure of relative disadvantage between populations contained within small geographic localities."

== Other works ==
In the series of Scottish Health Service Studies, Carstairs was author of:

- Study #1, Patients under Psychiatric Care in Hospital: Scotland 1963 (1966), with Alwyn Smith
- Study #2, Home Nursing in Scotland: Report of an Enquiry into Local Authority Domiciliary Services (1966)
- Study #11, Channels of Communication (1970). By 1966, Carstairs at work in Scottish hospitals had recognised communication as a problem.
- Study #19, The Elderly in Residential Care (1971) of care models for the elderly, with Marion Morrison. The authors argued that two-thirds of those at that time in care homes could be in sheltered housing.
- Study #42, Services for the Elderly (1982), with John Bond.

Carstairs was co-author, with T. Abelin and Z. J. Brzezinski, of the WHO handbook Measurement in Health Promotion and Protection (1987). This work was a joint publication of the WHO and IEA, and a sequel to Measurement of Levels of Health (1979) by Walter W. Holland, J. Ipsen, and J. Kostrzewski, intended to complement its coverage of disease with material on health.
