= John McMurtrie (moderator) =

Scottish minister and naturalist

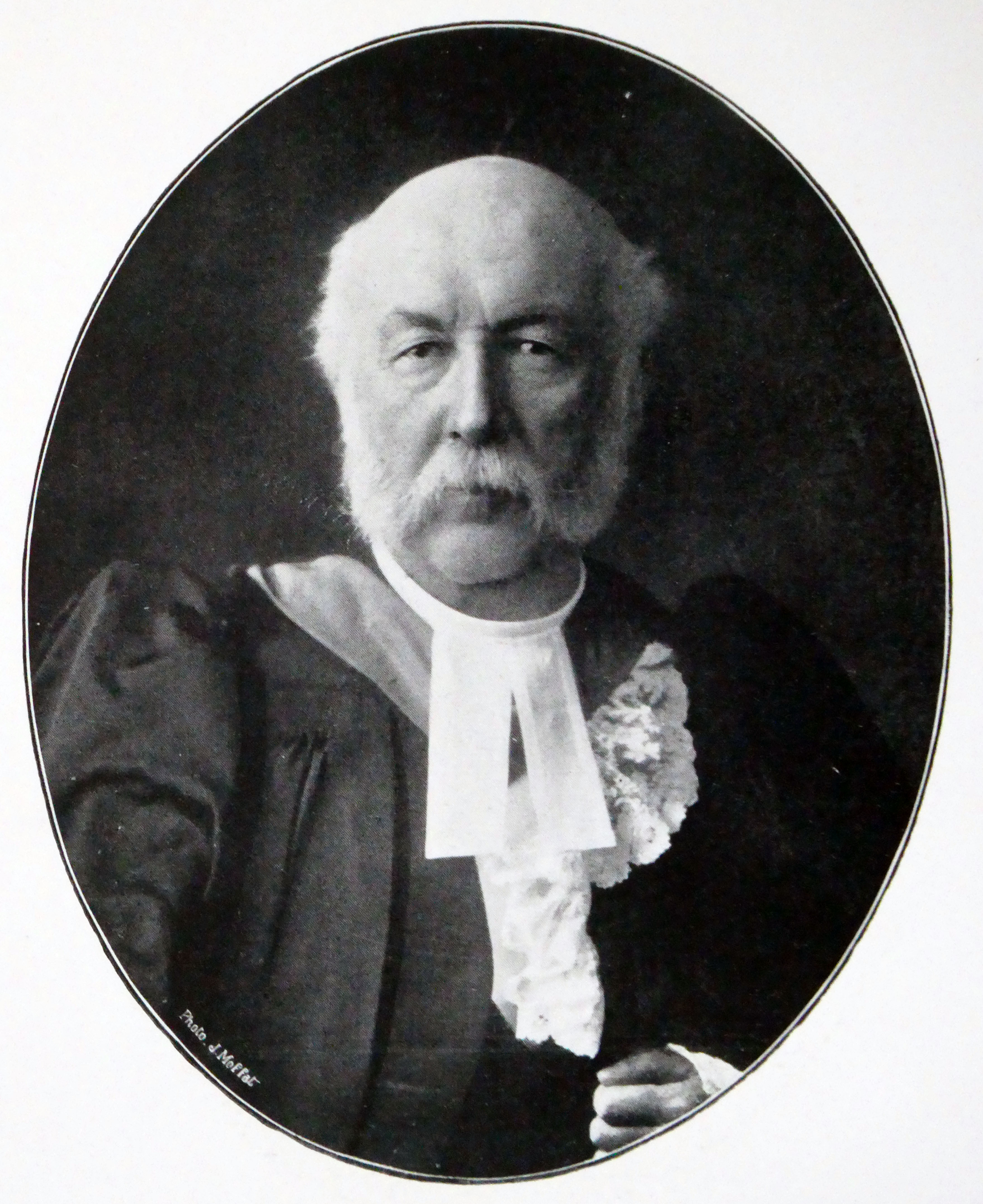
"The Right Rev. John McMurtrie, D.D., Moderator of the Church of Scotland" in "Edinburgh and the Lothians At The Opening of the Twentieth Century" by A. Eddington. with Contemporary Biographies edited by W T Pike. Published in 1904.

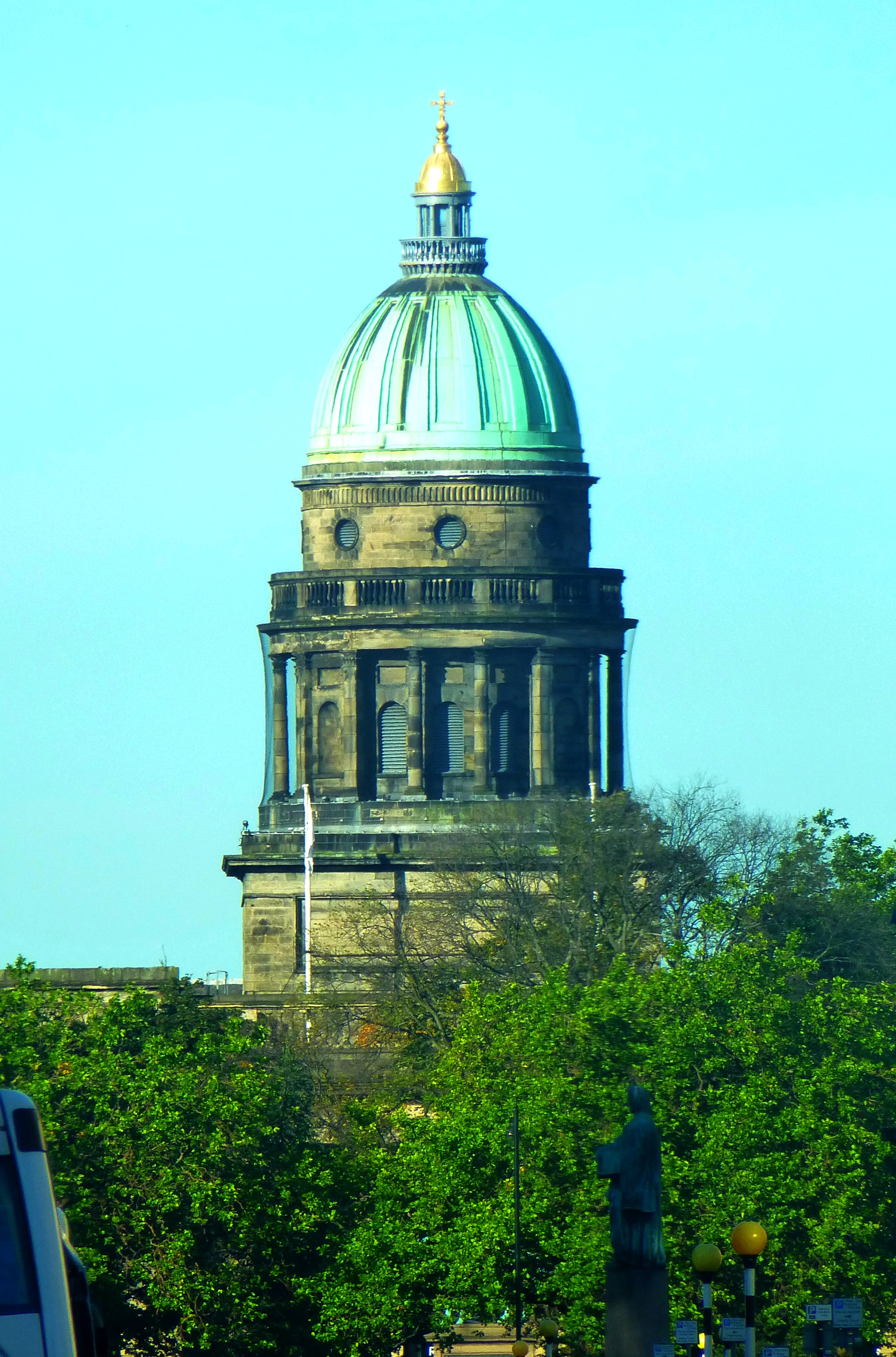
St Georges in Edinburgh – now known as West Register House

John McMurtrie FRSE (1831–1912) was a Scottish minister and naturalist. He served as Moderator of the General Assembly of the Church of Scotland in 1904. As a naturalist he had a special interest in conches.

== Life ==
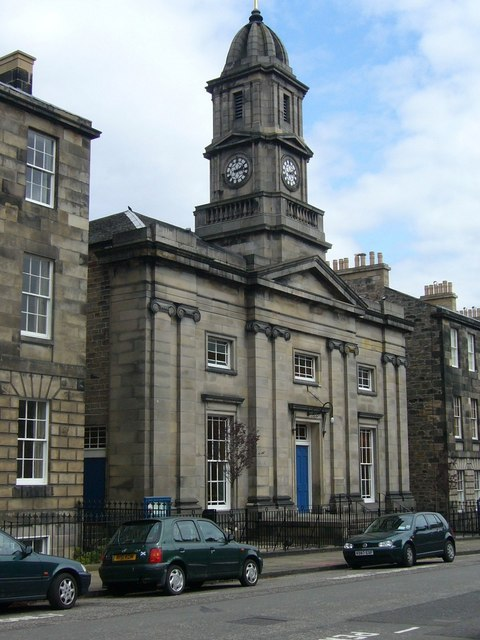
St Bernard's Church, Saxe Coburg Street, Edinburgh

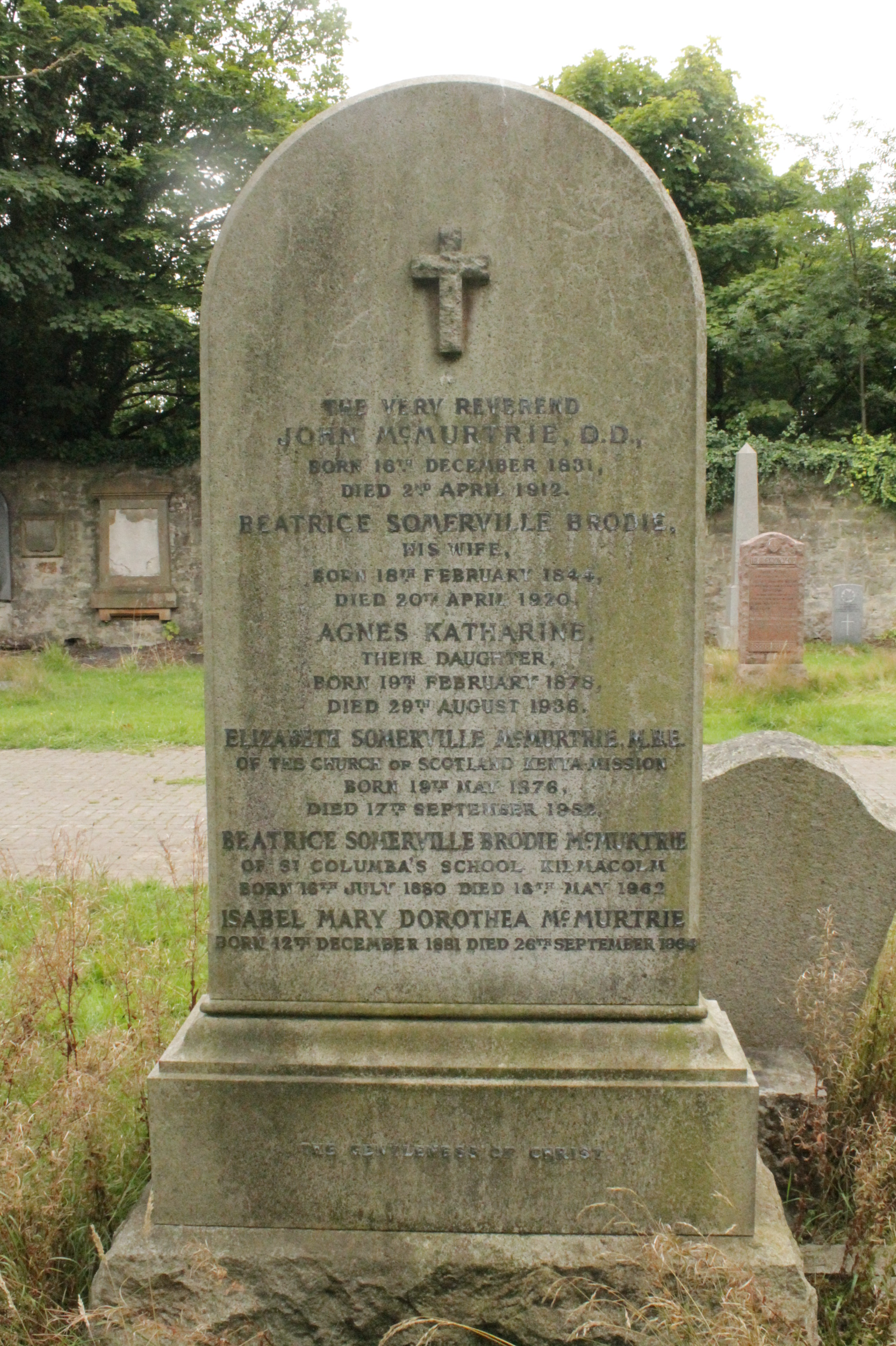
The grave of Very Rev John McMurtrie, Warriston Cemetery

He was born on 16 December 1831 in Ayr the son of Agnes Tweedie Nichol and her husband, John McMurtrie a bank agent (b. 1799). He was educated at Ayr Academy. He then studied divinity at the University of Edinburgh graduating BA in 1854 with an MA in 1856.

He was licensed to preach as a minister of the Church of Scotland by the Presbytery of Ayr later in August 1856 and began assisting at New Kilpatrick Church. In 1858 he translated to the prestigious St George's Church on Charlotte Square in Edinburgh. He only stayed a few months before translating to Mains and Strathmartine.

In 1866 he moved to St Bernard's Church in the Stockbridge district of the city. He was minister there until 1885, living at 14 Inverleith Row. He was replaced by Rev George Matheson. He then joined the Committee on Foreign Missions for the Church of Scotland.

He succeeded Very Rev Archibald Charteris as Editor of Life and Work magazine in 1880 and served as Editor until 1898 when he was succeeded by Rev Archibald Fleming. The University of Aberdeen awarded him an honorary doctorate (DD) in 1890.

In 1893 he was elected a Fellow of the Royal Society of Edinburgh. His proposers were Sir Andrew Douglas Maclagan, Very Rev James MacGregor, Peter Guthrie Tait, and Alexander Buchan.

He lived his final years at 13 Inverleith Place in north Edinburgh.

He died in Edinburgh on 2 April 1912. He is buried close to his home, in Warriston Cemetery with his wife Beatrice. The grave backs onto the main entrance path (on its east side), just before the start of the slope. He is also memorialised in Dean Cemetery on the grave of his in-laws the Brodies.

== Family ==
In 1875 he married Beatrice Somerville Brodie (1844–1920). Their son John McMurtrie was also a minister.

They had four daughters: Agnes Katharine McMurtrie (1878–1936); Elizabeth Somerville McMurtrie MBE (1876–1952, a Church of Scotland missionary Kikuyu, Kenya); Beatrice Somerville Brodie McMurtrie (1880–1962) became a teacher in Kentish Town; and Isabel Mary Dorothea McMurtrie (1881–1964). All daughters are buried with them in Warriston Cemetery.

Their son John McMurtrie (b.1879) was minister of Skene, Aberdeenshire. Alexander Church Brodie McMurtrie (b.1883) was a doctor.

Their grandson, also Rev John McMurtrie, married Mary Margaret Mitchell, renowned as an artist under the name Mary McMurtrie.

== Publications ==
He was editor of "Life and Work" for 18 years and also contributed to the Journal of Conchology.
