= Archibald Fleming (b. 1863) =

Archibald Fleming TD Order of St Sava (1863–c.1930) was a Scottish minister, military chaplain and religious author. He was Grand Chaplain to the Grand Lodge of Freemasons in Scotland.

== Life ==
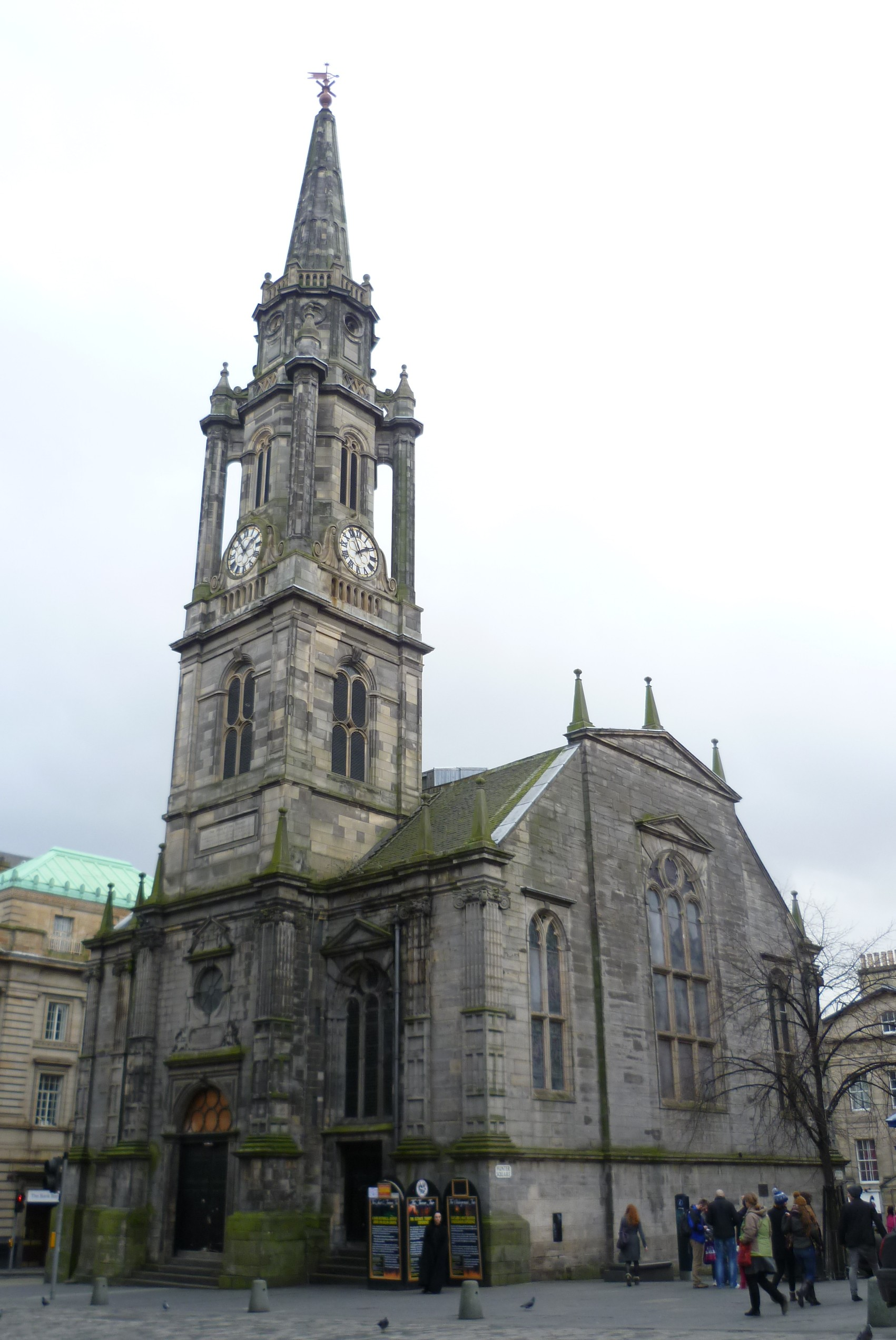
Tron Kirk, Edinburgh

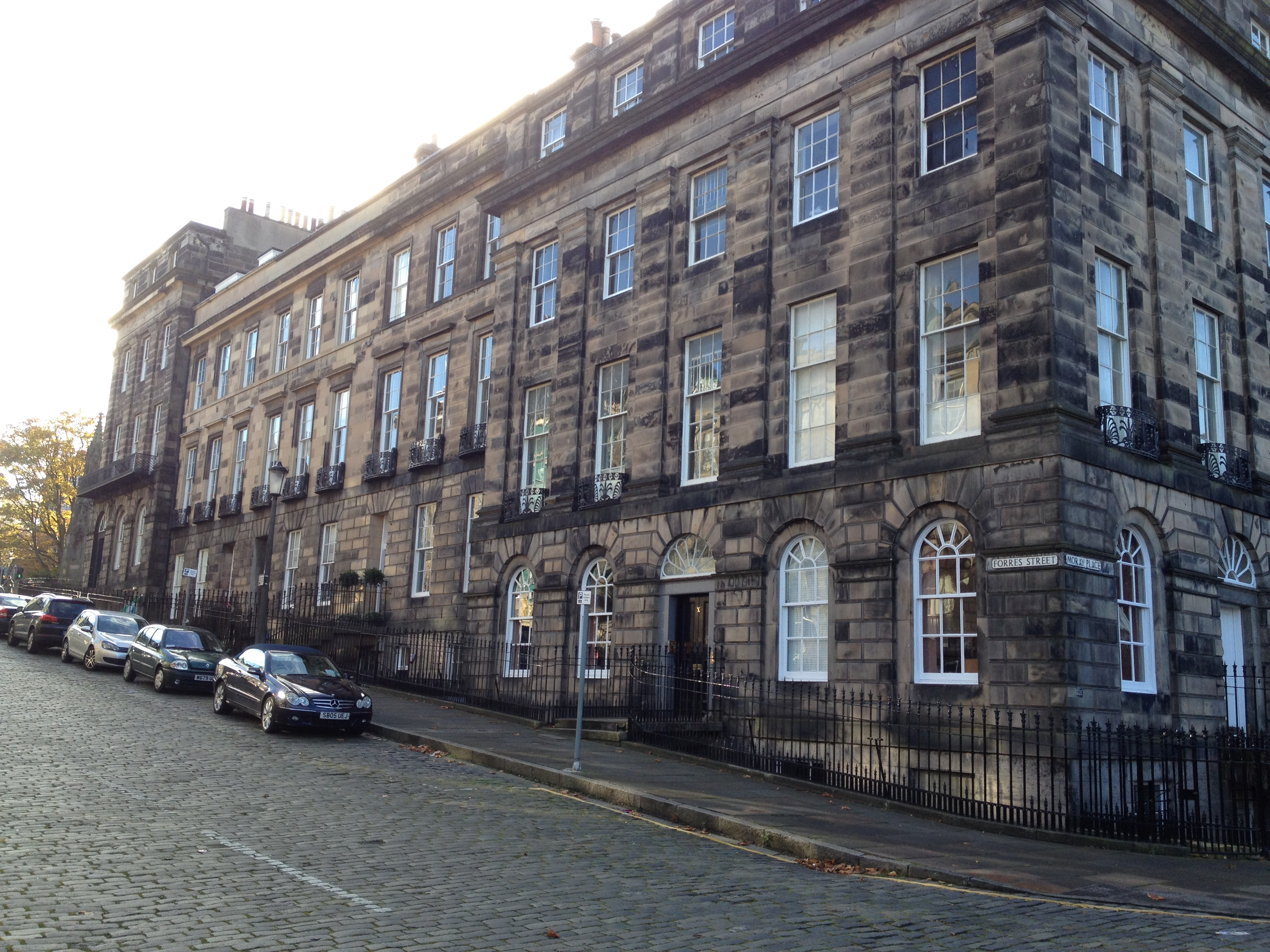
Forres Street in Edinburgh

He was born on 27 December 1863, the eldest son of Rev Archibald Fleming, of Inchyra House, near Perth, Scotland. His father was minister of St Paul's Church in Perth.

He was educated at Perth Academy and then studied Divinity at University of Edinburgh (graduating M.A. in 1883). Like his father he became a Church of Scotland minister. Licensed by the Presbytery of Perth in 1887 he became assistant at St Cuthbert's Church, Edinburgh the same year. He was ordained to Newton on 25 September 1888; transferred to Tron Kirk in Edinburgh on 18 May 1897; acting chaplain 9th V.B. (Highlanders) the Royal Scots, 1898–1902, and London Scottish, 1903–1922. He was chaplain to the Lord High Commissioner, 1918–1920, the Monarch's representative at the annual, General Assembly of the Church of Scotland. Due to his work in Serbia during the First World War he was awarded the Serbian Order of St Sava in 1919.

He was editor of the church's magazine Life and Work from 1898 to 1902. He was succeeded as editor by John Ferrier. Thereafter, he became Minister of St Columba's Church, in Pont Street, London. He became Moderator of the Scottish Church in England in 1929.

== Family ==
On 14 September 1898, he married Agnes Jane, daughter of Robert Cecil Williamson, Moray Place, Edinburgh. Their children were:

- Archibald Robert Cecil, born 1899
- William Hamilton Dalrymple, born 1901
- Christian Isobel, born 1903
- Roberta Cecilia Helen, born 1909

== Freemasonry ==
He was a Scottish Freemason having been Initiated in The Lodge of Holyrood House (St Luke's), No. 44, on 22 January 1896. He was the Grand Chaplain in the Grand Lodge of Scotland 1897-1899.[1] In 1899 he gave a lecture: ‘The Memory of King Robert Bruce.’ At this time he was resident at 9 Forres Street on the Moray Estate in Edinburgh.
