= Catherine Charteris =

British philanthropist

- Born: Catherine Anderson; 1837
- Died: 18 November 1918 (aged 80–81); Edinburgh, Scotland, United Kingdom of Great Britain and Ireland
- Other name: Katie Charteris
- Occupation: Philanthropist
- Known for: President and driving force of early Church of Scotland Guild
- Spouse: Archibald Hamilton Charteris

Catherine Charteris born Catherine Anderson (1837 – 18 November 1918) was a British philanthropist.

== Life ==
She was born in 1837 in Aberdeen. Her parents were Rachel, born Johnston, and Alexander Anderson who was the Lord Provost of Aberdeen). She was educated at home, so when her mother was too ill to serve as hostess she would step up to the role while he was Lord Provost. His work attracted Archibald Hamilton Charteris who came to Aberdeen to interview her father in 1860.

In 1863 she married Charteris. He would in time become a Professor at Edinburgh University.

The 'Woman's Guild' was founded in 1887 by the General Assembly of the Church of Scotland on the initiative of her husband. Charteris acknowledged woman were already involved in Christian service but that there "was a need to develop and organize them as an official working unity within the church." Another source credits Catherine Charteris's "wise counsel and loving heart" and that the guild "owes its very existence to her efforts". She became the influential editor of the Woman's Guild Supplement which she saw as creating a parliament of women. Through that publication she inspired ambition and challenged complacency among the women readers who she thought suffered from low self esteem. A key appointment was Katherine Davidson who became the Guild's first deputy in 1889. She was creditted with inspiring more branches with her infectious enthusiasm as she went to over 100 different parishes by horse and cart.

Within ten years, there was 29,000 members in 400 branches. Catherine Charteris had become the Guild's first national president in 1897 and she served until 1906. It was noted that Catherine's role was overshadowed by her husband's profile. Catherine had been effectively President since much earlier. (Discrimination within the church is illustrated by the milestone in the 1930s when the first woman, Lizzie Meredith, was allowed to chair the Guild's central committee.)

In 1997, following a major review, the Guild adopted its current constitution. The new constitution changed the name 'Woman's Guild' to 'Church of Scotland Guild' - and opened up groups to men as well as women.

== Death and legacy ==
Charteris died in Edinburgh from burns.

The guild in 2006 had about 35,000 members and was one of Scotland's largest voluntary organisations.
