= Annandale Water =

Small loch in Dumfries and Galloway, Scotland

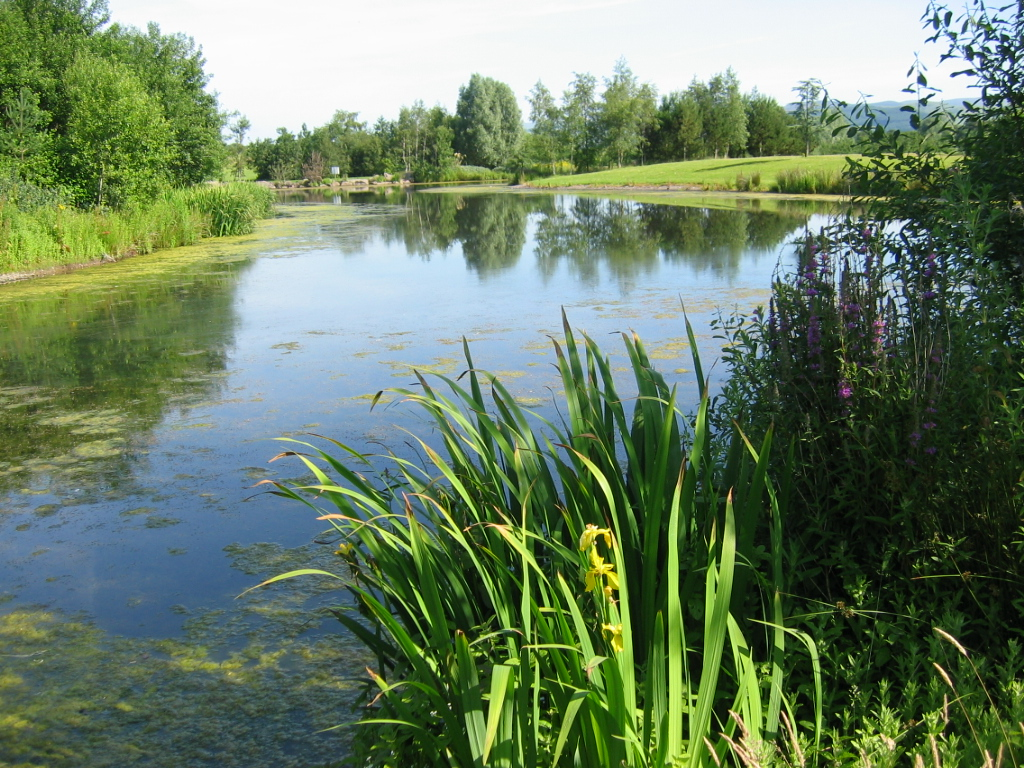
- The loch and island

- Location within Scotland
- Location: Annandale, Dumfries and Galloway, Scotland
- Coordinates: 55°13′10″N 3°24′34″W
- Basin countries: United Kingdom

Annandale Water is a loch in Annandale, Dumfries and Galloway, in the south west of Scotland. It is part of Annandale Water service station at Junction 16 of the A74(M), close to Johnstonebridge, Dinwoodie and Newton Wamphray, and halfway between Moffat and Lockerbie.

Before the opening of the Motorway service station, the old A74 road was adjacent to the loch and farmland. The services were opened at Easter 1995, and the lake and nature trail are a valuable amenity for motorists, walkers and others.

SEPA, the Scottish Environment Protection Agency, regularly monitors the water quality and other factors.

Wildfowl populate the loch in large numbers, including mute swans and geese, and mallards.

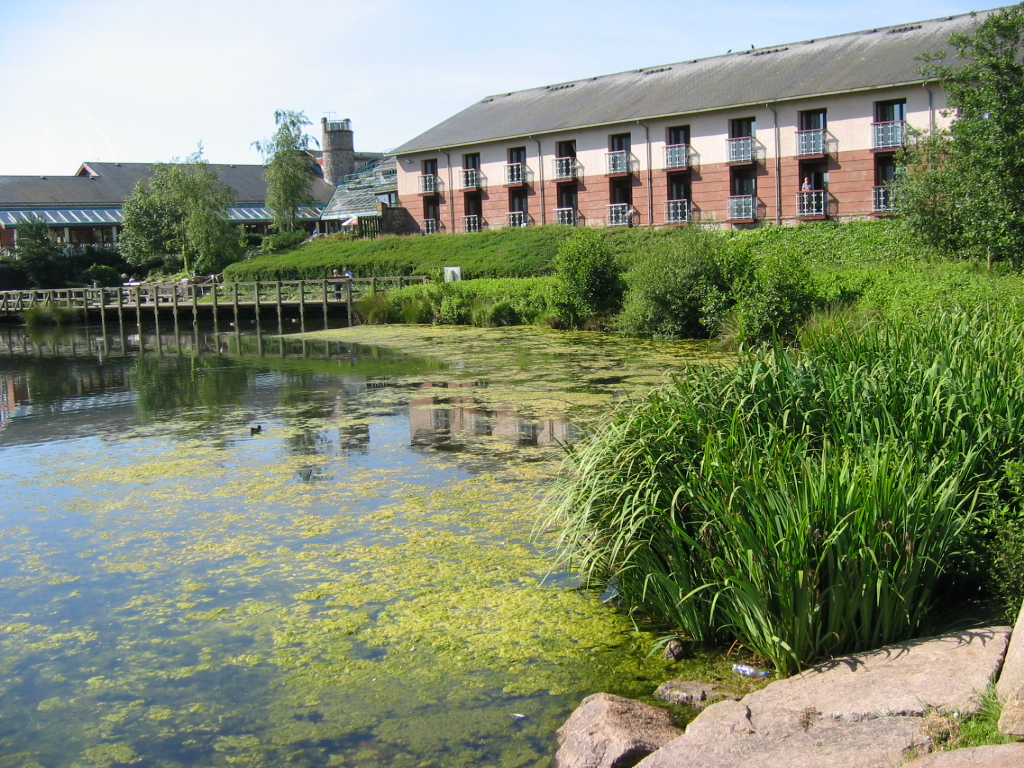
The loch and services

== See also ==
- List of places in Dumfries and Galloway
