= James Shepherd (Australian cricketer) =

Australian cricketer

Personal information
- Born: 24 May 1857; Steiglitz, Colony of Victoria
- Source: ESPNcricinfo, 31 January 2017

James Shepherd (born 24 May 1857, date of death unknown) was an Australian cricketer. He played five first-class matches for New South Wales in 1889/90.

== See also ==
- List of New South Wales representative cricketers
