= Bakrana =

- Country: India
- State: Gujarat
- District: Ahmedabad

Languages
- Time zone: UTC+5:30 (IST)
- Website: gujaratindia.com

Bakrana is a village in Sanand Taluk in Ahmedabad district in Gujarat State, India. Bakrana is 33 km from its Taluk Main Town Sanand. Bakrana is 55 km distance from its district's main city Ahmedabad.

Zala (kshatriya) are in the majority of the population.
