= James Sheppard (cricketer) =

Australian cricketer (1888–1944)

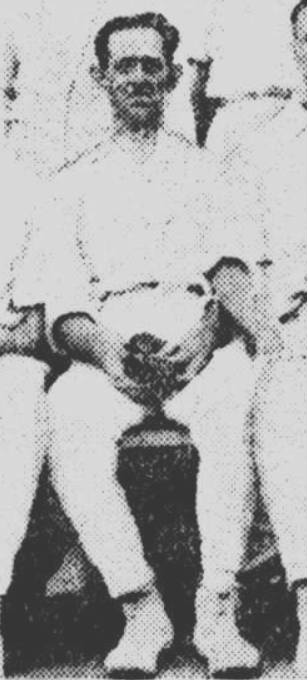

Personal information
- Born: 16 January 1888; Brisbane, Queensland, Australia
- Died: 10 December 1944 (aged 56); Hendra, Queensland, Australia
- Source: Cricinfo, 6 October 2020

James Sheppard (16 January 1888 – 10 December 1944) was an Australian cricketer. He played in twenty first-class matches for Queensland between 1912 and 1924.

== Cricket career ==
Sheppard played for Toombul in Brisbane Grade Cricket at district level scoring 5583 runs at an average of 23.45 in 180 matches and earning a reputation as being particularly strong scoring runs behind the wicket and he was also described as a brilliant slip fieldsman. He began playing for Queensland at state level in 1912 and in 1920 he captained Queensland in a match against the Australian Imperial Force XI.

== See also ==
- List of Queensland first-class cricketers
