= Mary McMurtrie =

Scottish botanical artist and horticulturist (1902 – 2003)

Mary McMurtrie DA SBA (Note: Society of Botanical Artists) (26 June 1902 – 1 November 2003) was a Scottish botanical artist and horticulturalist. She wrote and illustrated several books of wild flowers and became internationally recognised for her botanical art. She continued painting and publishing until she was over a hundred years old, becoming recognised as the oldest working artist in Britain.

== Early life ==
Mary Margaret McMurtrie (née Mitchell), daughter of George and Jeannie Mitchell, was born in Skene in rural Aberdeenshire where her father was the headmaster of the local school. She was educated at Albyn School for Girls in Aberdeen. From early childhood she sketched animals in the fields near her home. She proved herself adept at art so she went to Gray's School of Art where she was one of the first female students. She came first in her year when she graduated and so would have won the prize of a study visit to Italy. However, because this was not considered appropriate for a girl (who it was assumed would only go on to become a housewife), the prize was instead awarded to the boy who came second. She then took a course at the College of Domestic Science in Aberdeen.

== Horticulture ==
She married Rev John McMurtrie (son of Rev John McMurtrie and grandson of Very Rev John McMurtrie), the minister of Skene, in 1924 and the couple had four children. In her book Where the Apple Ripens, Jessie Kesson recalled her childhood memory of the exotic Himalayan cowslips in the McMurtries' manse garden at the time when they befriended the girl from the nearby orphanage. McMurtrie's husband died in 1949 and so she had to bring up her two youngest children on her own. As well as painting flowers, she had a love of horticulture so she moved from Skene to Aberdeen to set up a horticultural nursery in her garden where it became a thriving business. She wrote the description of Skene parish in the Third Statistical Account of Scotland and published articles of local interest in the Scots Magazine and the Deeside Field. In 1960 she bought 16th-century Balbithan House near Kintore, Aberdeenshire, a country mansion which she completely restored. She transformed the gardens there into a leading North East Scotland nursery, specialising in alpines, rock plants and old varieties of garden flowers. In particular, she cultivated roses, violas, pinks, primulas and other native wild flowers. She, along with such gardeners as Margery Fish and Gladys Emma Peto, were the only people who kept some old varieties of garden flowers.

== Botanical art ==
With her detailed knowledge of wild flowers she developed her watercolour flower painting beyond a hobby. She always painted directly from life. She did a lot of painting when holidaying in the Algarve, and in Kenya where her daughter lived. McMurtrie exhibited her paintings in local art galleries and eventually became internationally recognised as one of Britain's leading botanical painters. The University of Lisbon commissioned her to illustrate The Flowers of the Algarve, a series of six booklets published between 1973 and 1998. At the request of the author, she painted the illustrations for Roy Genders' 1975 book Growing Old-fashioned Flowers.

McMurtrie retired from running the nursery and moved back to Aberdeen where she did the illustrations and text for her first book of flowers, Wild Flowers of Scotland, published when she was 80. Scots Roses of Hedgerows and Wild Gardens was published in 1998 and Scottish Wild Flowers in 2001.

Mary McMurtrie completed the illustrations for Old Cottage Pinks shortly before her death on 1 November 2003 at the age of 101. She had continued to paint until the last few weeks of her life and had just completed proof reading her latest book. Peter McEwan, author of the Dictionary of Scottish Art, said "She was one of the outstanding – and possibly the outstanding – botanical flower painters in Scotland of her era. She had exhibitions of her work in France, in Portugal, in Kenya, at the Royal Horticultural Society in London, and, of course, here in Scotland". The UK charity for the elderly Counsel and Care had recognised her as the oldest active artist in Britain.

After her death, some of her unpublished paintings were published in Mary McMurtrie's Country Garden Flowers.

== Publications ==
=== Author / illustrator ===
- McMurtrie, Mary (1982). Wild Flowers of Scotland. Towie Barclay Castle, Aberdeenshire: Heritage Press (Scotland).
- McMurtrie, Mary (1999). Scots Roses of Hedgerows and Wild Gardens. Suffolk: Garden Art Press. ISBN 978-1870673266.
- McMurtrie, Mary (2001). Scottish Wild Flowers. Woodbridge: Garden Art Press. ISBN 9781870673389.
- McMurtrie, Mary (2003). Old Cottage Pinks. Woodbridge: Garden Art Press. ISBN 9781870673501.
- McMurtrie, Mary (1973). Wild Flowers of The Algarve. Aberdeen: Mary McMurtrie.
- McMurtrie, Mary (1986). More Wild Flowers of The Algarve. Aberdeen: Mary McMurtrie.
- McMurtrie, Mary (1992). Wild Flowers of The Algarve, Book III. Aberdeen: Mary McMurtrie.
- McMurtrie, Mary (1995). Wild Flowers of The Algarve, Book IV. Aberdeen: Mary McMurtrie.
- McMurtrie, Mary (1997). Shrubs of the Algarve. Aberdeen: Mary McMurtrie.
- McMurtrie, Mary (1998). Trees of Portugal. Aberdeen: Mary McMurtrie.

=== Illustrator ===
- Genders, Roy (1975). Growing Old-fashioned Flowers. Illustrated by McMurtrie, Mary. Newton Abbot: David & Charles. ISBN 9780715368732.
- Alfonso, Maria Da Luz Rocha (1991). Plantas do Algarve. Illustrated by McMurtrie, Mary. Lisbon: Servico Nacional De Parques. ISBN 9789729034459.
