= Morris Carstairs =

British physician, psychiatrist and anthropologist

Morris Carstairs FRCPE FRCPsych

2nd Vice-Chancellor of the University of York
- In office 1973–1978
- Preceded by: Eric James, Baron James of Rusholme
- Succeeded by: Berrick Saul

President of the World Mental Health Organization
- In office 1968–1972

Personal details
- Born: George Morrison Carstairs; 18 June 1916 Mussoorie, British Raj
- Died: 17 April 1991 (aged 74) Edinburgh, Scotland
- Spouse: Vera Carstairs
- Education: George Watson's College
- Alma mater: University of Edinburgh

Military service
- Allegiance: United Kingdom
- Branch/service: Royal Air Force Volunteer Reserve
- Years of service: 1942–1946
- Rank: Flight lieutenant
- Unit: RAF Medical Services
- Battles/wars: World War II

George Morrison Carstairs (18 June 1916 – 17 April 1991) was a British psychiatrist, anthropologist, and academic. He was Professor of Psychological Medicine at the University of Edinburgh from 1961 to 1973, President of the World Mental Health Organization from 1968 to 1972, and Vice-Chancellor of the University of York from 1973 to 1978. In his youth, he had been a distinguished long-distance runner.

== Early life ==
Carstairs was born on 18 June 1916 in Mussoorie, India, then part of the British Raj. He was the son of George Carstairs (died 1948), a Church of Scotland missionary, and his wife Elizabeth Huntley Young. He spent his childhood in India and became fluent in both English and Hindi. At the age of ten, he and his family moved to Edinburgh, Scotland. He was educated at George Watson's College, then an all-boys private school in Edinburgh.

He was an accomplished long-distance runner in his youth. He was the Scottish 3 miles champion in 1937, 1938 and 1939. He represented Scotland at the 1937 International University Games, winning a silver medal in the 5000 metres in a time of 15:24.2. He also represented Scotland at the 1939 International University Games, winning a gold medal in the 5000 metres in a time of 15:20.2. He represented Great Britain at the 1938 European Athletics Championships, coming sixth in the Men's 5000 metres with a time of 14:51.3.

== Career ==
=== Military service and early medical career ===
Carstairs went to study medicine at the University of Edinburgh. In 1941, during World War II, he graduated Bachelor of Medicine, Bachelor of Surgery (MB ChB). Following graduation, he worked in general medicine as an assistant physician at the Royal Edinburgh Hospital for a year. He was then called up for active service as a medical officer with the Royal Air Force; and was commissioned into the Medical Branch of the Royal Air Force Volunteer Reserve on 15 May 1942 as a flying officer (emergency). He was promoted to flight lieutenant (war substantive) on 15 May 1943.

In 1946 Carstairs was demobilised .

=== Field work in India ===
Carstairs studied anthropology, at Cambridge and in the USA: he learned social anthropology from E. E. Evans-Pritchard, Meyer Fortes and Alexander H. Leighton. In 1948–9 he was in the US as a Commonwealth Fellow. He was trained in the "culture and personality" approach to psychological anthropology in New York, by Margaret Mead.

In 1949, Carstairs joined the India Field Project organised by Gitel P. Steed for Columbia University. It was run in three Indian villages, referred to by disguised names: Carstairs was almost exclusively concerned with "Deoli" in Rajasthan, where he lived for six months in 1950, and was visited there over the summer by Steed. His residence, after his marriage in December 1950 to Vera Hunt, in Sujarupa, and later visits to India, are noted in the Oxford Dictionary of National Biography. Two books resulted from this field work, which had Rockefeller Foundation funding 1950–1. Carstairs had a further Henderson research scholarship for support in 1951–2.

On his 1951–2 visit to India, Carstairs brought mental tests. He wrote on Hinduism, his views being influenced by Melanie Klein and second-generation Freudianism, an approach also adopted by Philip Spratt. His book The Twice-Born (1957) on the topic was published by the Hogarth Press and had a preface by Margaret Mead.

=== Psychiatrist ===
In 1953, Carstairs began his career in psychiatry when he was appointed a senior registrar at the Maudsley Hospital, a psychiatric hospital in London, England. There he worked with chronic psychiatric patients under the supervision of Sir Aubrey Lewis. During his work, he come to the conclusion that patients with schizophrenia needed a neutral environment to cope with their condition and returning them to an 'emotionally charged family setting' would only set back their recovery. He also discovered that improved motivation in patients helped their rehabilitation. Carstairs received his medical degree from the University of Edinburgh in 1959.

In 1960, he was appointed head of a new Medical Research Council unit based at University College London. This unit led the study of psychiatric epidemiology in the United Kingdom. When he moved to Edinburgh in 1961, he moved the unit with him and continued its research. He stood down as director in 1971, and was followed by Norman Kreitman. In 1962 he was elected a member of the Harveian Society of Edinburgh.

From 1968 to 1972, he was President of the World Mental Health Organization. While holding that post, he was involved in the development of psychiatric facilities in under-developed countries. In 1978, he left academia and devoted his time to advising the World Health Organization on developing psychiatric services in India, with emphasis on making them appropriate to Asian needs.

=== Academic career ===
In 1961, Carstairs was appointed Professor of Psychological Medicine at the University of Edinburgh. At the university he created a new working group of academics and practising psychiatrists for research and teaching; it was the first such group created outside London. At the university he taught a wide range of course at both undergraduate and graduate level.

He gave the 1962 Reith Lectures, a series broadcast on BBC Radio, under the title This Island Now. In one lecture he condoned pre-marital sex, which produced controversy. His statement of belief was offensive to some British Christians, given that he was the son of a minister.

In January 1973, he was appointed Vice-Chancellor of the University of York. He was only the second person to head the university as it had only been established in 1963. The 1970s were a difficult time to be involved in university leadership in the United Kingdom. The country was in recession and student protests were frequent. He had plans to expand the university both physically and in the number of subjects it taught, but because of the hostile atmosphere he faced these were not achieved during his vice-chancellorship. This experience meant that he never returned to full-time academia after leaving the post in the summer of 1978.

== Later life ==
Carstairs developed senile dementia in his later years. He withdrew from professional life, and was cared for by his first wife. He died at his Edinburgh home on 17 April 1991.
