= Balbithan House =

16th-century L-plan tower house in Scotland

Coordinates: 57.260174°N 2.313054°W

Balbithan House (/bælˈbɪθən/ bal-BITH-ən) is a three-storey L-plan tower house dating from the 16th century. Alternative names are Old Place of Balbithan, Old Balbthan and Balbythan House. It is located in Aberdeenshire, Scotland, 4 kilometres (2.5 mi) south-east of Inverurie.

== History ==
The grounds once belonged to the Abbey of Lindores, but by 1490 the Chalmers family had acquired them. An earlier House of Balbithan, of which there is now no trace, also stood above the River Don, opposite Kintore.

The Chalmers built the new house, probably as an oblong with one round tower, in about 1560. A second wing, added in about 1600, entailed the removal of the tower, which had been to the north-west.

Jacobites are supposed to have used the tower in 1746, after Culloden. The Chalmers sold the property to James Balfour, an Edinburgh merchant, in 1696. After a brief period – from 1699 to 1707 – in the ownership of the Hays, it came to be owned by a branch of the Gordons until 1859.

In the century to 1860 internal alterations were made. The top floor was removed early in the 19th century, and the second-floor ceilings were raised.

It was bought in 1960 by the botanical artist Mary McMurtrie, who restored it.

== Structure ==
Balbithan House is an L-plan tower, unusual in that the new wing, dating from 1630, and the original are of equal length. There is an unvaulted kitchen on the ground floor, with the long hall, a long gallery or withdrawing room, and bedrooms successively above. A small addition on the north side, which housed a service stair, has been removed. Attached to the south turret of the west wing is a metal sundial; it is dated 1679 and carries the initials of James Chalmers. It is a category A listed building.

The gardens, recreated by McMurtrie, are regarded as important, and very fine.
