= Church of Scotland Guild =

Movement within the Church of Scotland

Logo of the Woman's Guild

The Church of Scotland Guild or simply The Guild (formerly known as the Woman's Guild), is a movement within the Church of Scotland.

Historically it was, and often in practice it is, an exclusively woman's movement. It has groups, organised at a congregational level, in most of the parishes of Scotland. The aim of the movement is "to invite and encourage both woman and men to commit their lives to Jesus Christ and to enable them to express their faith in worship, prayer, and action". The associated motto is "Whose I am, and Whom I serve'.

== History ==
The 'Woman's Guild' was founded in 1887 by the General Assembly of the Church of Scotland on the initiative of A. H. Charteris. Charteris acknowledged woman were already involved in Christian service but that there "was a need to develop and organize them as an official working unity within the church." Another source credits his wife noting Catherine Charteris's "wise counsel and loving heart" and that the guild "owes its very existence to her efforts". She became the influential editor of the Woman's Guild Supplement which she saw as creating a parliament of women. Through that publication she inspired ambition and challenged complacency among the women readers who she thought suffered from low self esteem.

In 1889 it was noted that there were three levels of women's involvement in the church. The first was as Guild members and this was intended to involve every woman associated with the church. A second level was the "Women-Workers Guild" whose members were approved by Kirk sessions after two years work. The top level were the new Deaconesses who were not ordained but whose "Christian work in connection with the Church the chief object of [their] life".

A key appointment was Katherine Davidson who became both a deaconess and the Guild's first deputy in 1889. She was creditted with inspiring more branches with her infectious enthusiasm as she went to over 100 different parishes by horse and cart. There were only 33 branches of the guild when she started.

The first conference was held in November 1891 at the Deaconess Hospital, Edinburgh on the 18th and 19th.

By 1907 there was 29,000 members in 400 branches.

Catherine Charteris had become the Guild's first national president in 1897 and she served until 1906. It was noted that Catherine's role was overshadowed by her husband's profile. Catherine had been effective President since much earlier.

Davidson was severely injured in 1918, but by her death in 1925 there were 879 different branches which had in total 52,000 members.

In 1935 or 1937 the first woman, Lizzie Meredith, was allowed to chair the Guild's central committee.

This guild reached a peak in the 1950s of over 160,000 members. By the centenary of 1987, this had halved to 80,000. Also from the 1950s, Young Mothers' groups were formed, which eventual evolved into the Young Woman's Groups section of the Guild who shared the same basic aims.

In 1997, following a major review, the Guild adopted its current constitution. The new constitution changed the name 'Woman's Guild' to 'Church of Scotland Guild' - and opened up groups to men as well as women.

In 2006 the guild had about 35,000 members and was one of Scotland's largest voluntary organisations

At the end of 2025, the Guild had 9,965 members across 441 groups.

== In other countries ==
The Women's Guild has similar organisations in other Presbyterian churches. In Malawi the women's guild is known as Mvano women or the Chigwirizano and it has hundreds of thousands members. The members dress in white with black skirts. The tradition dates back to 1876 when missionaries arrived and they translated their hymns into local languages. The Mvano women continue this tradition and dance has become a vital part of their worship.

== Structure ==
At a congregational level, groups are free to organise under the supervision of the local Kirk Session. The structure of these groups varies depending on size and other local needs. Larger groups will have a committee and often a 'President', who traditionally is an influential figure in the life of the local church.

Above the local level, groups are organised into area 'Presbyterial Councils' (which meet depending on local needs). Each Council nominates one person to serve at the national level on one of the five main committees.

The committees are: Executive, Finance and General Purposes, Projects and Topics, Programmes and Resources, Marketing and Publicity. The Guild is also represented on the Church of Scotland's Church and Society Council and Mission and Discipleship Council.

The Guild reports annually to the Church's General Assembly, through its National Convenor. The Assembly approves any changes to the Guild's constitution.
