= The Black Book: The Nazi Crime Against the Jewish People =

1946 book

The Black Book: The Nazi Crime Against the Jewish People is an indictment of the Holocaust and documentation of evidence leading up to it commissioned by the World Jewish Congress. It was submitted for evidence at the Nuremberg Trials as evidence against the Nazis for crimes against the Jewish people. The book was prepared in 1946 by the Jewish Black Book Committee, which included the World Jewish Congress; the Jewish Anti Fascist Committee, USSR; Vaad Leumi, Palestine; and the American Committee of Jewish Writers, Artists, and Scientists.

== Content ==
The Black Book is broken down into seven sections: Indictment, Conspiracy, The Law, Strategy of Decimation, Annihilation, Resistance, and Justice.

=== Indictment ===
This section, written by Max Radin, outlines the accusations against the Nazis that the book makes. Radin gives three ways in which the Nazis killed Jews: pogrom, gas chamber, and starvation. He also accuses the Nazis of deliberately organizing society to put Jews at the bottom, indoctrinating children to think like Nazis, and robbing Jews of their property and driving them from their homes.

=== Conspiracy ===
This section, written by Frances McClernan, describes the beginnings of Nazi antisemitism as a carefully organized plan that was a basic part of Nazi dynamics. First, the Nazis hid their plan to take over the world by accusing Jews of planning the same. Using pseudoscience and falsified history, they created something called the "Jewish World Plot" where the Jews would exterminate Aryans and take over the world.

The Nazis rejected the God of the Old Testament, since he was described as "the God of the Jews". They would often selectively choose passages of the New Testament to support their ideology. In 1937, Dr. Heinz Weidemann, Bishop of Bremen, wrote a Nazified version of the Gospel of St. John.

In order to indoctrinate children to Nazism, the Nazis not only had to educate the youth of Germany but also had to un-educate years of European culture. After ten years of Nazi propaganda and grooming society to believe that Jews were the enemy, they eventually came to actual violence in 1932 when shops were destroyed and people beaten. On March 29 of the following year, a boycott of Jewish businesses was ordered.

Nazis spread antisemitism in any country they could. Often, they advertised antisemitism as a defensive front against communism. The Nazis made Jews the enemy of the Soviets, saying that the USSR was controlled by Jews living in prosperity while the people suffered. They also planted Judaism in any country they could to justify their aggression, such as using photographs as evidence that Franklin Roosevelt was a Jew. They used this to justify the war.

=== The Law ===
This section, written by Anne L. Bloch, gives a history of all anti-Jew laws passed by the Nazis starting in April 1933 and extending throughout the war. These laws were based on what the "Aryan Man" deemed right or wrong, and since Jews were considered a "legal wrong" they had to be eliminated.

=== Strategy of Decimation ===
This section, written by Gitel Poznanski, describes the three ways that the Nazis weakened the Jewish population before putting them into death camps. The first was expulsion - forcing the Jews out of Nazi-occupied land and into Poland or the USSR. This made them easier targets for slave labor later and severed any connections they may have made at home. The first arrests of Jews were for their "protection", which quickly turned into the first detention camps in 1933. Using these camps as a threat, the Nazis forced Jews to emigrate very quickly, which often lead to illegal immigration. In Austria this process was much worse. In Germany the process of expulsion took place over about five years, but after the Anschluss the process was carried out in only a few months. Because of this there were over 3,500 deaths by suicide in the first year of the occupation, and the number of Jews in Austria shrank from 180,000 to 55,000. Poznanski goes on to describe similar practices in many other Nazi-occupied countries: Czechoslovakia, Holland, Belgium, Luxembourg, France, Norway, Denmark, Hungary, Greece, and Yugoslavia. The next process was the institution of slave labor. 165,000,000 Europeans were forced to work under threat of being sent to concentration camps. The Nazi strategy was not to treat them like valuable resources to be kept alive; instead they were "worked to the point of debilitation" and "kept on the edge of starvation". This practice was carried out in Germany, Czechoslovakia, Holland, Belgium, France, and Poland. The last process was starvation. The book provides many graphs and figures of how much food was rationed to people in each occupied country. Germany always got the most food, and any food to be found in another country was pillaged so that "Germany ate while her subjects starved".

=== Annihilation ===
This section describes the grim Nazi death camps and how they came to be. Originally Nazis would kill the Jews using traditional methods of hanging and shooting, but these were found to be too slow and inefficient. To fix this problem, they started using the gas chamber as their main method of murder. When they realized that the tide of the war had turned and that they might be forced to answer for their crimes, the Nazis began to dig up the corpses of those who had been killed in gas chambers and burn them. In order to again make the process more efficient, crematoriums were built on the gas chambers. This section also provides many eyewitness accounts of the concentration camps, mostly prisoners of war.

=== Resistance and Justice ===
These sections, written by Frances McClernan and B.Z. Goldberg respectively, are the two shortest in the book. The first, Resistance, describes how the Jewish people resisted during the war, and how some of them escaped. The second and last, Justice, states how everything documented in the book is not the complete record of Nazi crimes, and could never represent the "full horror of the Nazi nightmare". The section also brings the book to a conclusion: "The objective of this effort was to bring before the world the basic pattern and the salient, incontestable facts of the murderous fascist conspiracy against the Jews."

== Reception ==
Initial reviews for The Black Book were mixed. Frederic Ewen called it "the most thoroughly documented and dramatic indictment of the Nazi atrocities available today" and "a story which must be read for its horrible truth". However, Hannah Arendt thought the book a technical failure, saying "The Black Book fails because its authors, submerged in a chaos of details, were unable to understand or make clear the nature of the facts confronting them."
