= Archibald Charteris =

Scottish theologian

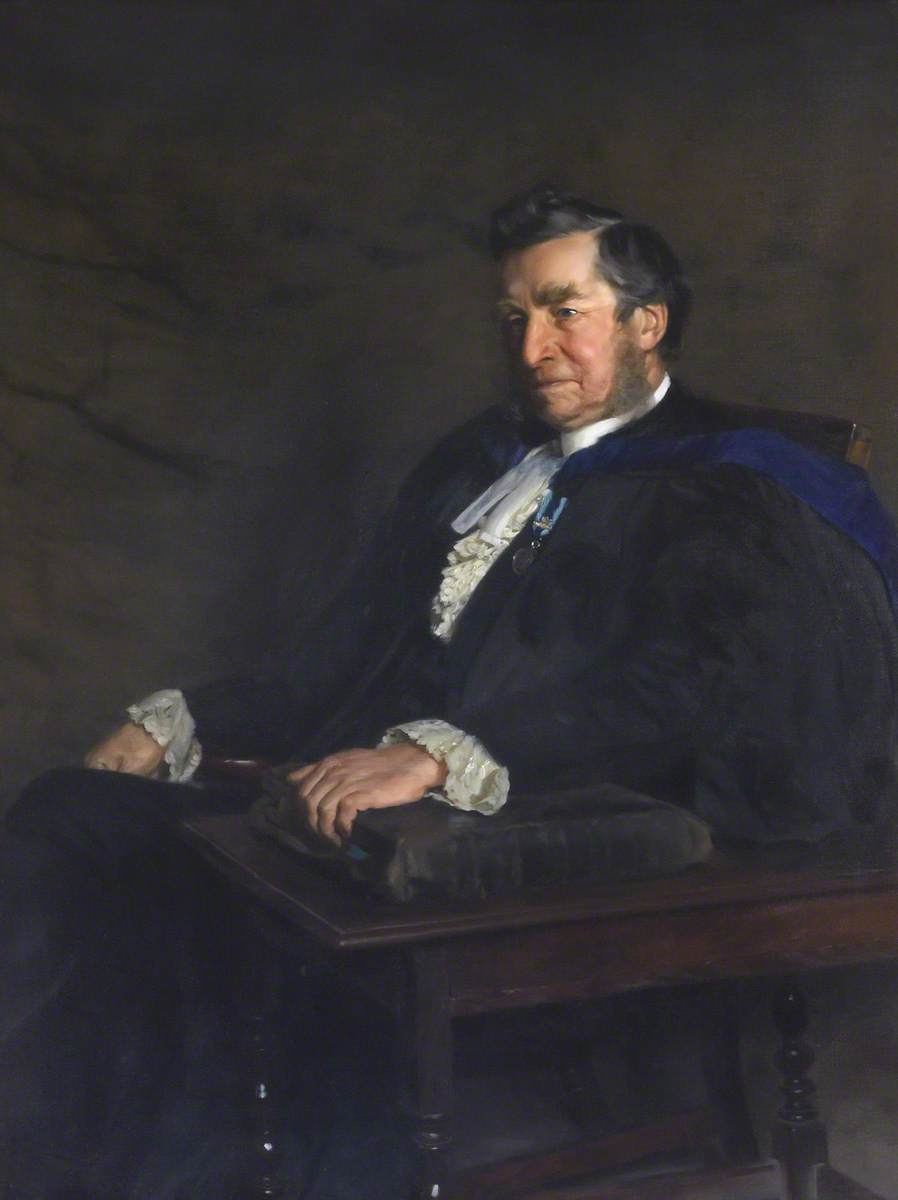
Charteris by John Henry Lorimer

Archibald Hamilton Charteris (13 December 1835 – 24 April 1908) was a Scottish theologian, a Moderator of the General Assembly of the Church of Scotland, professor of biblical criticism at the University of Edinburgh and a leading voice in Church reforms. He is credited as being the father of the Woman's Guild and founder of "Life and Work" magazine.

== Life ==
Letter by Archibald Charteris (1885)

He was born in Wamphray, Dumfriesshire, the eldest son of John Charteris, the parish schoolmaster, and his wife, Jean Hamilton, daughter of Archibald Hamilton, a farmer at Broomhills.

Charteris studied divinity at the University of Edinburgh graduating MA in 1854 and then did postgraduate studies in both Tubingen and Bonn University in Germany.

In 1858 he was ordained a parish minister of St Quivox in Ayrshire in place of Rev Stair Park McQuhae, his patron being Alexander Haldane Oswald of Auchincruive House. In 1859 he translated to New Abbey in Galloway and then Glasgow. In 1868 he became Professor of Biblical Criticism at the University of Edinburgh, until his retirement due to ill health in 1898. He was moderator of the General Assembly in 1892 and founded Edinburgh's Deaconess Hospital in 1894. Charteris also led the foundation of the St Ninian's Mission next to the Deaconess Hospital on the Pleasance in 1891. In 1913, the attached mission church was named Charteris Memorial in his memory. Since 2016, the complex has been known as the Greyfriars Charteris Centre in his memory.

He was appointed a Chaplain-in-Ordinary in Scotland to King Edward VII in October 1901.

Charteris was a conservative Biblical scholar, and a mild Calvinist. In April 1875, he was accused of writing an anonymous review in the Edinburgh Evening Courant of William Robertson Smith's article on the Bible in the Encyclopædia Britannica. His criticism led indirectly to Robertson Smith's trial for heresy in the Free Church of Scotland.

However, it was perhaps as a churchman that Charteris exercised his greatest influence. He was instrumental in initiating the Church's Committee of Christian Life and Work in 1869. He founded the magazine Life and Work in 1879, and began the Young Men's Guild and the Woman's Guild. He also was a leading proponent of the restoration of the office of Deaconess within the Church. In 1887 he founded the Church of Scotland's Woman's Guild. In 1880 he passed the editorship of Life and Work to Rev John McMurtrie.

In 1900-1901 he is listed as living in Cameron House on Dalkeith Road (now part of Edinburgh University's Pollock Halls of Residence).

He died on the afternoon of Friday 24 April 1908. He is buried with his parents in his home town of Wamphray.

== Family ==
His brother was Matthew Charteris, Regius Professor of Materia Medica and Therapeutics at Glasgow University. His wife was the philanthropist Catherine Charteris, daughter of Sir Alexander Anderson (advocate and Lord Provost of Aberdeen). They married on 18 November 1863 in Aberdeen, but had no children.

== Sources ==
Dictionary of Scottish Church History and Theology Wright, D.F. et al. (eds) Edinburgh 1993
