= James Shepherd (doctor) =

- Born: 2 February 1847; Aberdeen, Scotland
- Died: 29 March 1926 (aged 79)
- Known for: Medical missionary, builder of hospital, school, leprosarium, and church
- Scientific career
- Workplaces: Deoli, Amjer, and Udaipur, India

James Shepherd (2 February 1847 – 29 March 1926) was a Scottish physician and missionary known for his work in the Indian mission field. He founded the Rajputana Mission Hospital in Udaipur.

== Early life ==
James Shepherd was born on February 2, 1847, in Aberdeen, Scotland. He was one of four sons and two daughters, none of whom ever got married. From a young age, he was considered very bright, receiving a number of awards from Aberdeen Grammar School. While his father did not push him to pursue missionary work, Shepherd and his family belonged to St. Nicholas Lane Church, where Shepherd took a bible class that is thought to have influenced his decision to do so.

== Education ==
After deciding to become a missionary, Shepherd prepared thoroughly, focusing his attention both on medicine and the Gospel. In 1868, he graduated from Aberdeen University, and in 1871, he received an M.B., C.M., followed by an M.D. in 1873. During this time, he also attended the Divinity Hall of the United Presbyterian Church in Edinburgh for theological training. Although Shepherd enjoyed this period of education, he also longed to get out into the real world and do real work.

== Work as a missionary ==
=== Work in Deoli and Amjer ===
Shepherd began his missionary work in 1872 in Deoli, Rajasthan, at the time part of Rajputana. During this year, he had few responsibilities and devoted much of his time to learning Hindi, to allow him to preach to the local population in their language.

In 1874, Shepherd was moved to Amjer to take charge of its hospital. This was reportedly no easy task for such a young and inexperienced doctor and missionary. He saw patients of all sorts, and the mission report for that year shows that 1,700 cases were treated each month. In addition to his responsibility, Shepherd began to preach in surrounding areas and continued to learn Hindi.

=== Work in Udaipur ===
At the request of the United Presbyterian Church of Scotland, Shepherd went to Udaipur in 1877, where he did most of his work for the next 43 years. Although the local population was skeptical of him at first, Shepherd quickly won their confidence, and within eleven months, his dispensary had had 27,472 visits. He also treated people in their homes and held preaching meetings twice a week along with Isa Das.

In the summer of 1882, a cholera outbreak occurred in the city. Shepherd worked tirelessly to address it, and at its conclusion, his colleagues insisted that he take a furlough. While at home, he persuaded the Students' Missionary Society to gather money towards a new hospital in Udaipur. With this money, and a land plot gifted by the Raj, Shepherd began building the hospital upon his return and oversaw its development from beginning to end. In 1886, it was ready for use, and the Rajputana Mission Hospital opened to the public with a grand ceremony.

The completion of the hospital not only allowed Shepherd to practice medicine more efficiently but also sparked the next phase in his career, in which he pursued a number of different projects. In 1891, he opened Udaipur's first mission church on land granted by the Maharana Fateh Singh, 73rd Custodian of House of Mewar of the Udaipur royal family in recognition for his clinical service. Later, he established a Christian school for the Bhil people and an asylum for lepers.

== Impact ==
The impact of Shepherd's work in India is measured by the service to hundreds of thousands of patients with conditions ranging from malaria to broken bones, and his church has inspired the development of a Christian community including the school he founded. The church is now known as the Shepherd Memorial Church as well as the Church of North India and is the oldest surviving church in Udaipur. In Udaipur, there came to be a "Shepherd tradition," in which he created a new atmosphere, set up standards of truth and honesty, and stood for what was honorable.
