= Greyfriars Charteris Centre =

Community center in Edinburgh, Scotland

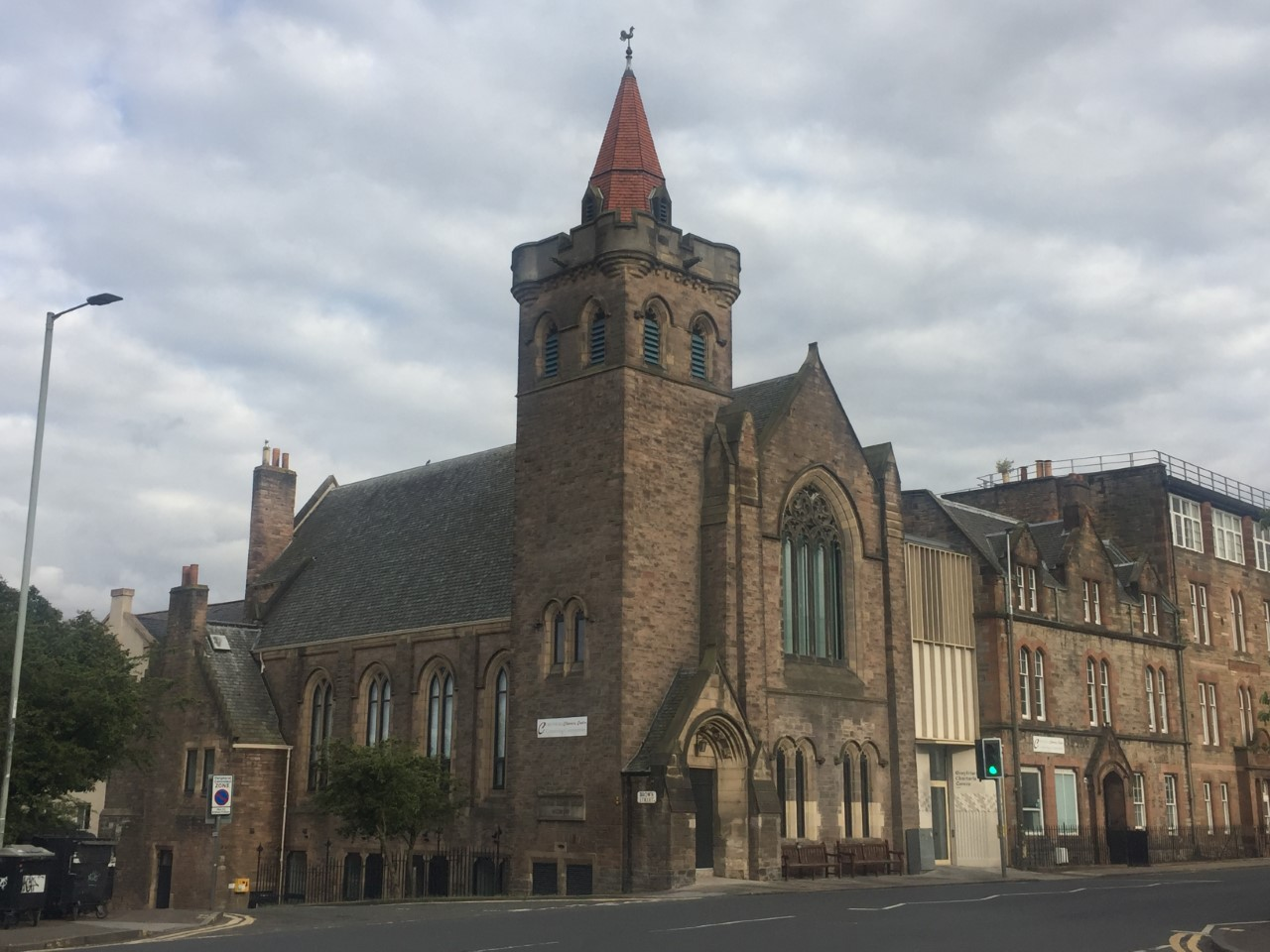
- Interactive map of the Greyfriars Charteris Centre area
- Former names: St Ninian's Mission (1891–1912); Charteris Memorial Church (1912–1953); Charteris-Pleasance Parish Church (1953–1969); Kirk o' Field Parish Church (1969–2013)

General information
- Status: Active
- Architectural style: Gothic Revival
- Location: 148 Pleasance; EH8 9RR, Edinburgh, Scotland
- Coordinates: 55°56′44.5″N 3°10′51.99″W
- Named for: Archibald Charteris
- Completed: 1891 (St Ninian's Mission); 1912 (Charteris Memorial Church)
- Renovated: 2019–2022
- Operator: Greyfriars Kirk

Design and construction
- Architects: Robert Wilson (St Ninian's Mission); James Bow Dunn (Charteris Memorial Church)

Renovating team
- Renovating firm: Konishi Gaffney Architects

Website
- charteriscentre.com

The Greyfriars Charteris Centre is a community centre in the Southside, Edinburgh, Scotland, part of the mission of Greyfriars Kirk. The centre opened in 2016 and occupies the 20th century church buildings which became Kirk o' Field Parish Church in 1969.

The church originated in the St Ninian's Mission, founded in 1891 at the instigation of Archibald Charteris to minister in the area of the Pleasance. The mission was staffed by the Church of Scotland's recently founded order of Deaconesses, who also ran the neighbouring Deaconess Hospital. An attached church, named Charteris Memorial Church, was founded in 1912. As the Southside's population and church congregations declined in the wake of the Second World War, neighbouring churches united with Charteris Memorial: first Pleasance in 1953, forming Charteris-Pleasance Church; then Buccleuch and Nicolson Street in 1969, when the name Kirk o' Field Parish Church was adopted; then St Paul's Newington in 1983. Kirk o' Field itself united with Greyfriars, Tolbooth and Highland Kirk in 2013. The united congregation retained the buildings for use as a community centre named in memory of Charteris, which opened in 2016.

The former Kirk o' Field church building was completed in 1912 to a design by James Bow Dunn in the late Scottish Gothic style. Robert Wilson designed the neighbouring St Ninian's buildings, which opened in 1891. Between 2019 and 2022, the buildings underwent a major programme of refurbishment and alternations under Konishi Gaffney Architects.

== Kirk o' Field Parish Church ==
=== Mission church ===
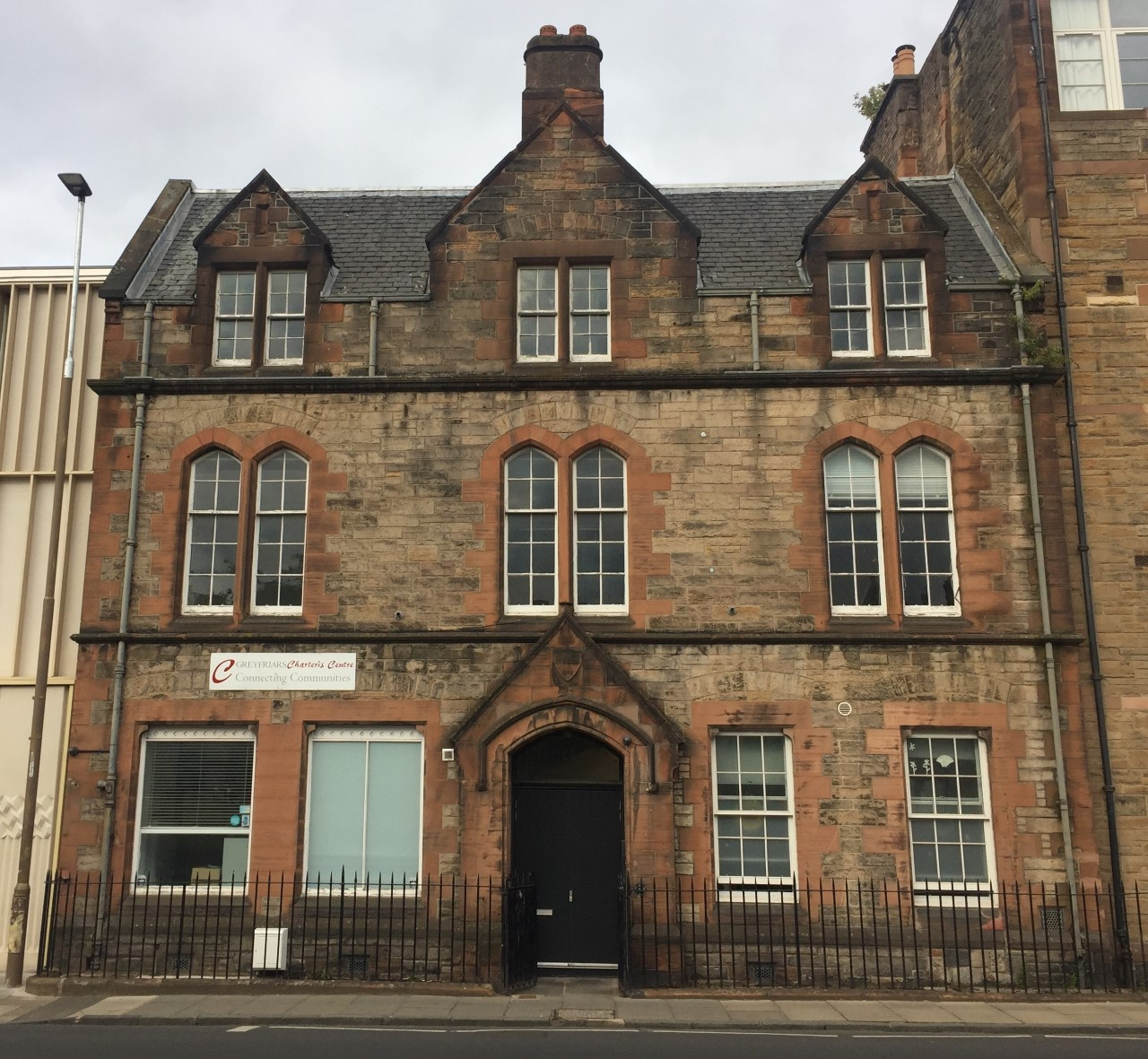
St Ninian's Mission

Charteris Memorial originated with the work of the Church of Scotland's Society of Deaconesses. A Deaconess House had been established at Mayfield Gardens in Newington in 1887 and moved to George Square the following year. The same year, Grisell Baillie was appointed the Church of Scotland's first deaconess. At the urging of Archibald Charteris, the St Ninian's Mission on the Pleasance, which the deaconesses staffed, was constructed and opened in 1891. The deaconesses also staffed the neighbouring Deaconess Hospital, which opened in 1894.

In 1905, William Cowan was appointed to have oversight of missionary training. Cowan was a highly active minister and, during his tenure, the mission hosted a wide range of activities, including various youth groups. The mission's work was supported by Alice Maxwell, who, between 1888 and 1911, served as the first superintendent of Deaconess House. On 24 May 1912, Cowan was appointed minister of the newly constructed church next to the mission. The church's minister was an assistant of St Cuthbert's and the church's district was an exclave of St Cuthbert's parish. The new church was named "Charteris Memorial".

In 1934, the General Assembly gave the church a constitution equivalent to a quoad sacra parish, which allowed the minister a seat on the presbytery. The church was not, however, fully independent: the presbytery retained the right to appoint six elders from other congregations to Charteris Memorial's session. The practice of appointing external elders proved unworkable and the provision was soon abandoned; though Charteris Memorial's special constitution was only withdrawn in 1954.

=== Parish church ===
During the ministry of Thomas Low between 1934 and 1953, the congregation remained relatively stable compared to most neighbouring churches, standing at 591 in 1935 and at 525 in 1950. After the ministry of Pleasance fell vacant in 1952, the two congregations united with name Charteris-Pleasance on 30 June 1953. The Charteris buildings were retained.

The population of the Southside declined throughout the post-war period, as did the congregations of the area's churches. In 1967, a six-way union between Charteris-Pleasance, Buccleuch, Nicolson Street, Newington and St Leonard's, St Paul's Newington, and St Margaret's, Dumbiedykes was proposed but fell through. The following year, proposals for a five-way union, excluding St Paul's Newington, also failed. In 1969, Charteris-Pleasance's parish expanded with the dissolution St Margaret's, Dumbiedykes.

Eventually, a three-way union with Nicolson Street and Charteris-Pleasance was agreed and a service of union was held on 7 September 1969. The united congregation retained the Charteris-Pleasance buildings. The name Kirk o' Field was adopted, referencing the pre-reformation Kirk o' Field where the Old College, University of Edinburgh, now stands. Co-operation between the uniting congregations proved successful; however, the church's membership quickly declined from 1,174 at the time of the union to 757 in 1972.

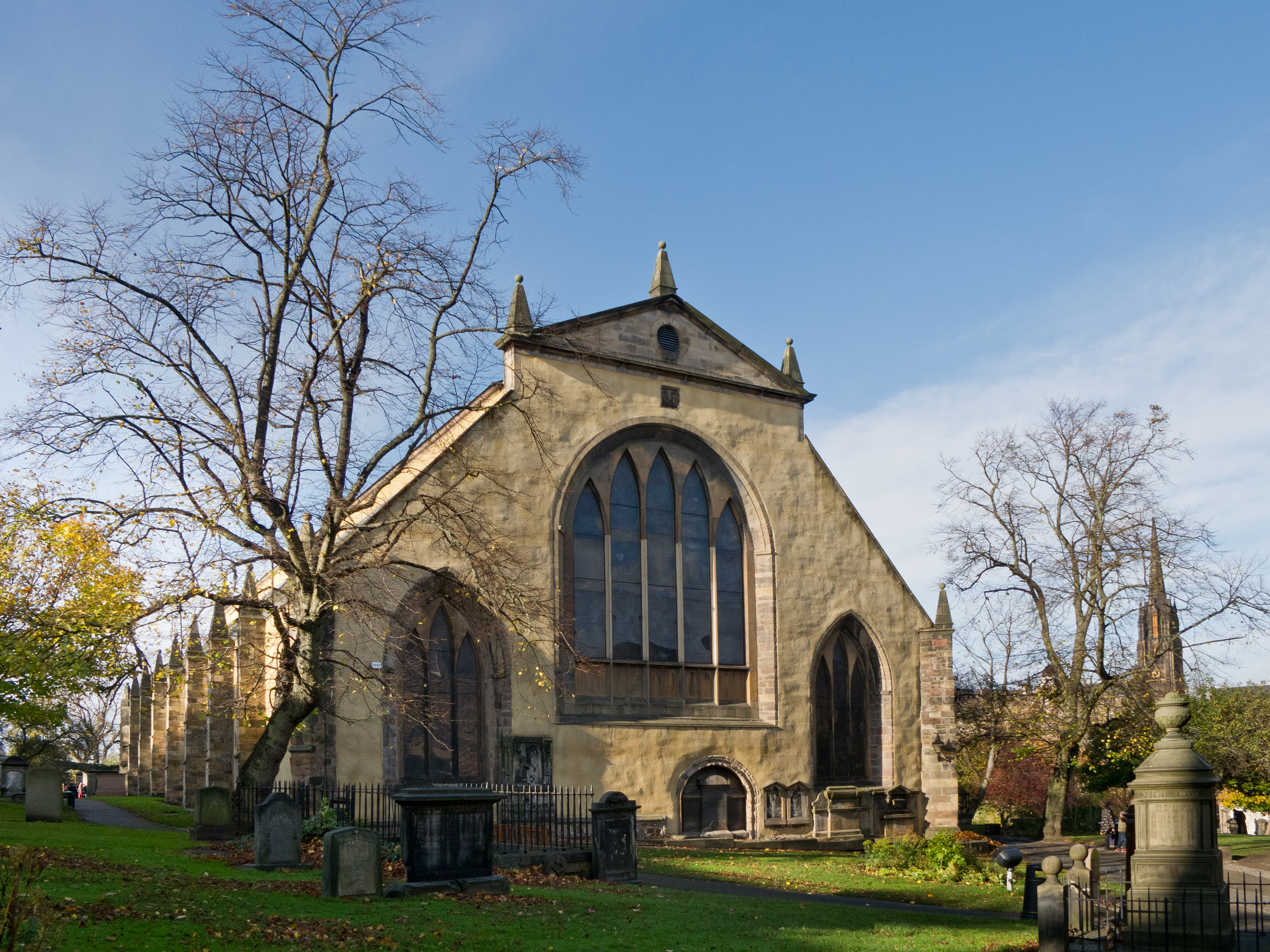
Greyfriars Kirk, with which Kirk o' Field united in 2013

In 1982, the church was invited to consider sharing a minister (linkage) with the Canongate Kirk; though the Kirk o' Field session rejected this. St Paul's Newington united with the congregation on 6 May 1984. In its latter years, Kirk o' Field continued to experience declining membership and activity. In this period, the congregation offered the St Ninian's buildings on leases to various organisations and Edinburgh's Korean congregation also used the church. In 2013, Kirk o' Field united with Greyfriars, Tolbooth and Highland Kirk in the Old Town.

=== Ministers ===
The following ministers served Charteris Memorial Church (1912–1953); Charteris-Pleasance Parish Church (1953–1969); and Kirk o' Field Parish Church (1969–2013):

1912–1917 William Cowan
1917 James Gillan
1918 Robert George Jamieson
1920–1925 George Campbell
1925–1927 Thomas Ramsay Kearney
1928–1934 Henry McKinley
1934–1953 Thomas Low
1953–1964 George Polson Jack
1965–1969 Charles Miller Gibson
1970–1973 James Eric Stuart Low
1974–1995 Farquhar MacDonald McArthur
1996–2012 Ian Douglas Maxwell

=== Plate ===
Plate in possession of the church included two silver cups, two silver plates and a flagon, all inscribed "Charteris Memorial Church 1912". The church's communion plate was used in 1994 at the European Conference on the Diaconate in Stirling. It had also been loaned for use in an episode of Take the High Road in 1983.

== Greyfriars Charteris Centre ==
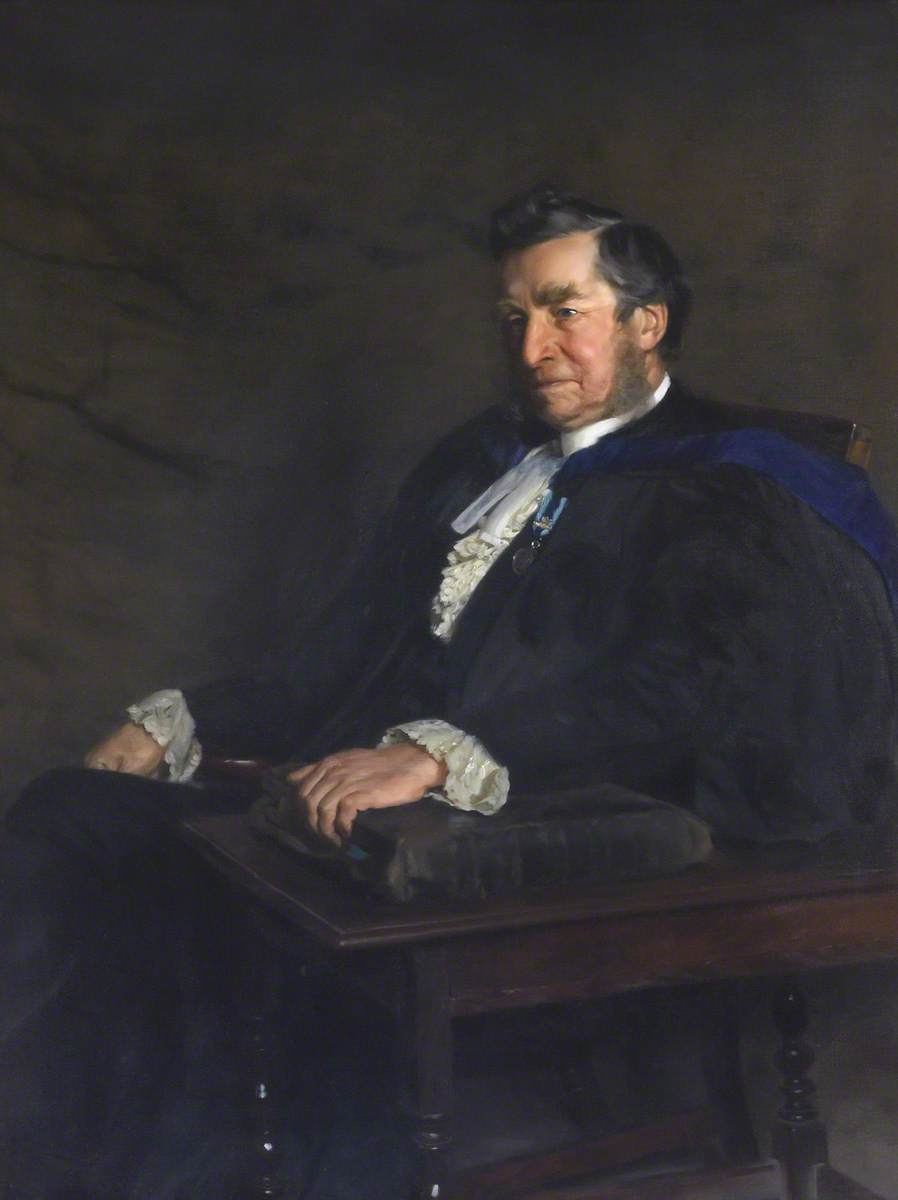
Archibald Charteris: namesake of the Greyfriars Charteris Centre

Following the union of Greyfriars, Tolbooth and Highland and Kirk o' Field, the united congregation held worship in the Greyfriars buildings while retaining the Kirk o' Field buildings. Following a period of consultation, Richard Frazer, minister of Greyfriars, set out a plan for a community centre based in the buildings. The new centre was named the Greyfriars Charteris Centre in honour of Archibald Charteris and opened in 2016.

The centre soon found its buildings were not fully adequate for the growing roster of activities they hosted. In 2017, the centre held a competition for designs to refurbish the buildings and improve accessibility. Konishi Gaffney Architects won, beating Hoskins Architects, Zone Architects, and Morgan McDonnell. Work took place between November 2019 and March 2022 and cost £1.7m. Konishi Gaffney's initial plans involved the removal of tracery from the west window and the cutting down of its margin to street level to create a two-storey glazed frontage. An application for planning permission was submitted in May 2018 and withdrawn in July 2018. Revised plans, which mostly preserved the west frontage, were submitted in September the same year and approved that December.

The centre defines itself as "a place for community, connection and wellbeing, providing a base and support for social enterprises, charities, local groups and activities". The centre offers meeting spaces for rental and for use by community groups. Following refurbishment, the former sanctuary of Kirk o' Field is known as the Binks Hall while a new space called the Sanctuary has been created over the vestibule. The lower hall of the Kirk o' Field buildings, formerly known as the Harry Miller Hall, has been partitioned to create spaces for communities enterprises. Facilities in the St Ninian's buildings include the St Ninian's Hall and Cowan and Baillie Rooms. The centre also manages bookings for the nearby Life Church on Davie Street.

During the Edinburgh Fringe, the building operates as Venue 393 under the name Just the Tonic Nucleus.

== Building ==
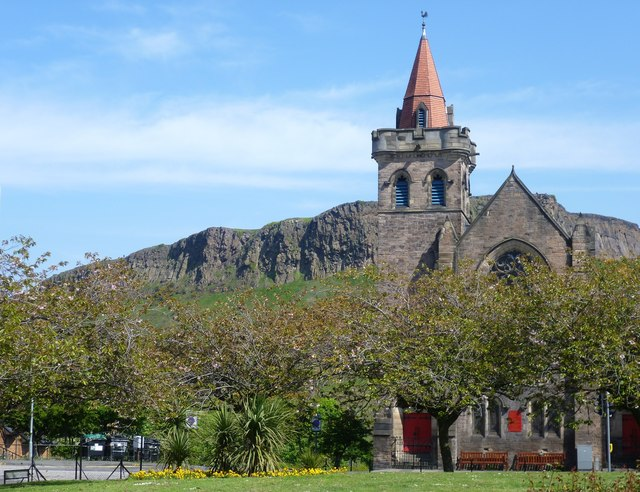
The centre seen from Deaconess Gardens with the Salisbury Crags in the background

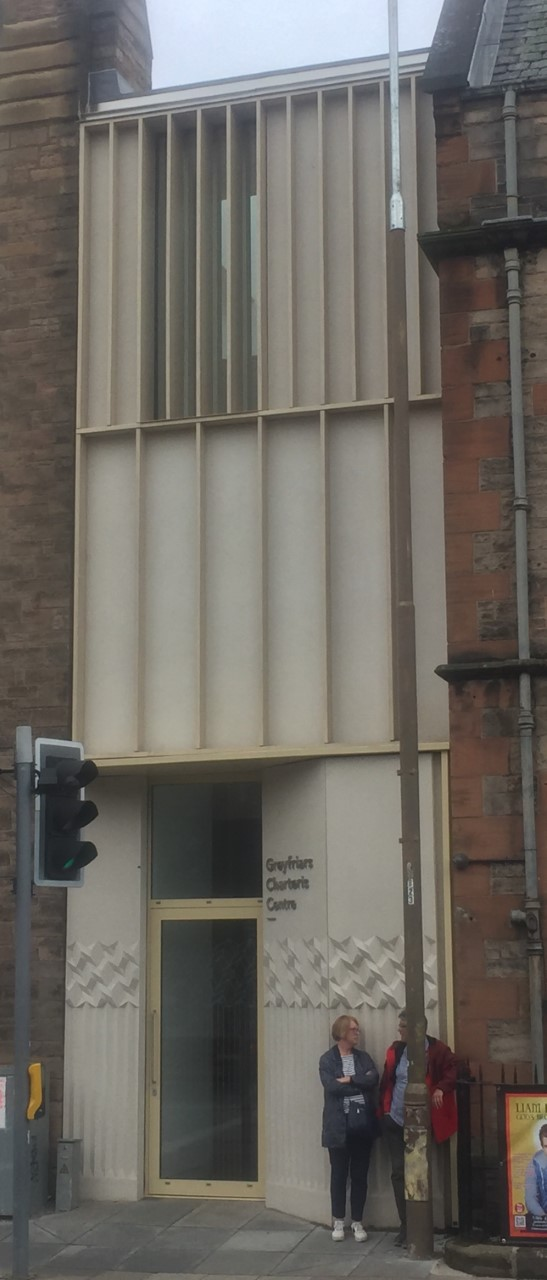
The reception space, added in the 2019–2022 alterations by Konishi Gaffney Architects

The Kirk o' Field building was constructed in 1912 to a design of James Bow Dunn, which imitates the late Scottish Gothic style. The front elevation centres on a curvilinear traceried window and is flanked by a short steeple with a red-tiled spire and a corbeled, battlemented parapet. From 1956, the church possessed a speaker system to play recorded bell music from the tower. This ceased during the following decade. Next door are the St Ninian's Mission buildings with a hall to the rear, which initially served as the mission church. The St Ninian's Mission buildings were designed by Robert Wilson and were opened in 1891. The former church officer's house stands on Brown Street behind the former Kirk o' Field building.

At the 2019–2022 refurbishment by Konishi Gaffney Architects, a three-storey reception space was constructed in the gap between the Kirk o' Field and St Ninian's buildings. The reception, with glass-fronted door, is faced in terrazzo and acetylated wood with the former textured in a pattern "inspired by an unravelled doric column". The reception's interior includes a lift and a stairwell lit through a skylight.

The interior is relatively plain. Prior to the 21st-century refurbishment, the pulpit stood to the north side of the chancel. On the south side stood the organ: a one-manual, nine-stop, pedal-less instrument of 1975 by Ronald Smith. The church had previously possessed an electric organ since 1956, when the church's first organ broke down. On the rear wall, there was, prior to the refurbishment, a plaque celebrating the Deaconesses of the Church of Scotland and another in memory of Archibald Charteris. The latter was cast by the Montacutelli Brothers of Paris incorporates a relief bust of Charteris by Phyllis Archibald. The interior retains its wooden wagon roof and masonry details; though the west gallery was removed in the 21st-century alterations, as was the vestibule ceiling with its "Lorimerian vine enrichment in plaster".

At the 2019–2022 refurbishment, the floor and window margins of the Kirk o' Field vestibule were lowered to street level. This created a landing, which opens to the former sanctuary (Binks Hall) above and to the former Harry Miller Hall below. On the first floor, in the space formerly occupied by the gallery at the west end of the sanctuary, a "Sacred Space", known as the Sanctuary, was created. A screen of soundproof glass and plywood fins separates it from the Binks Hall while allowing the flow of natural light. The former Harry Miller Hall beneath the sanctuary was partitioned into smaller rooms by glass walls.
