= King's Hall, Edinburgh =

The King's Hall
- Community Church Edinburgh
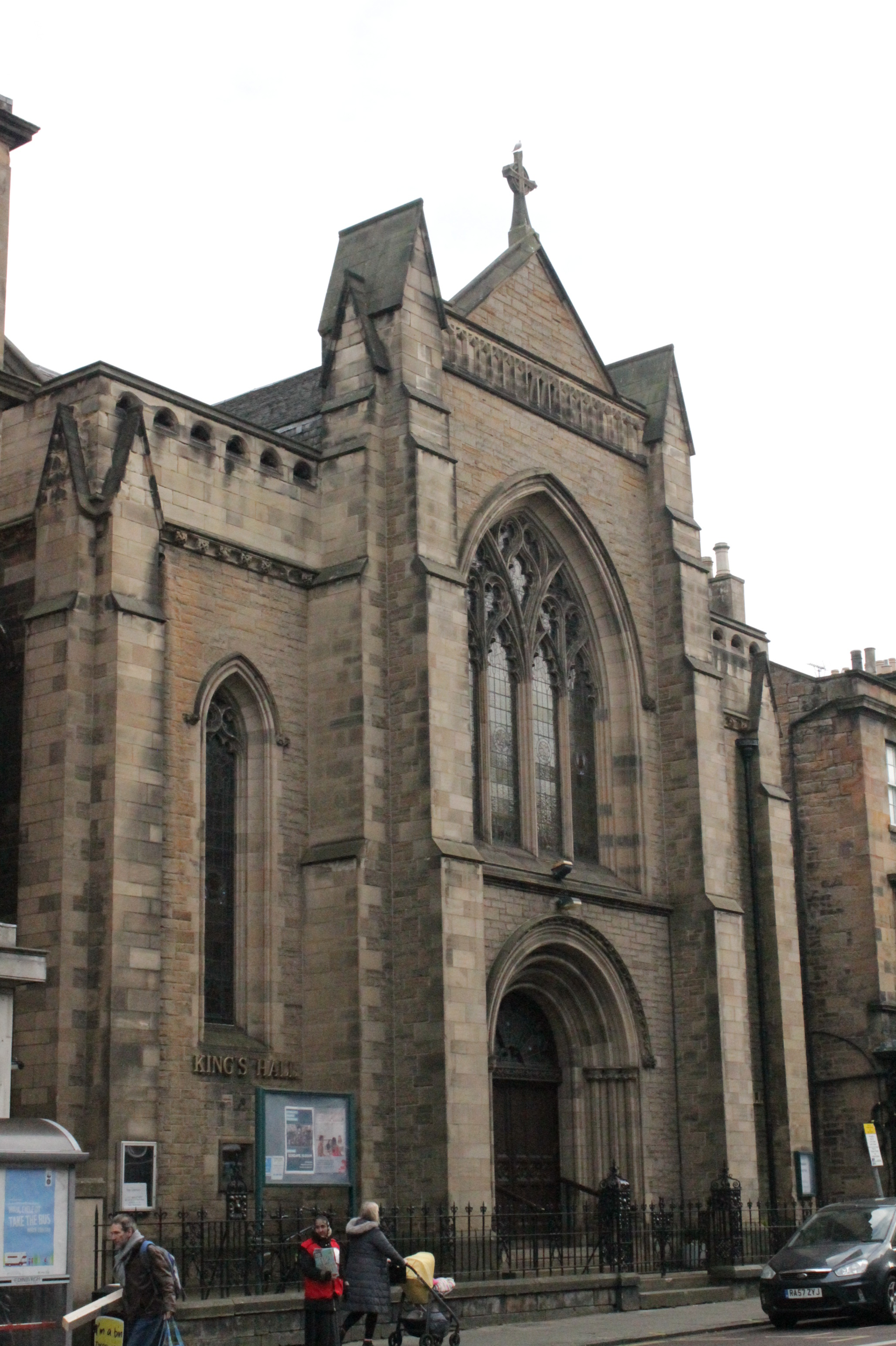
- The King's Hall
- 55°56′25.8″N 3°10′48.85″W
- Location: Edinburgh
- Country: Scotland
- Denomination: Independent evangelical
- Previous denomination: Church of Scotland (1929–1984); United Free Church of Scotland (1900–1929); Free Church of Scotland (1843–1900)

History
- Former name(s): St Paul's Newington Parish Church (1942–1984); Newington East Parish Church (1929–1942); Newington United Free Church (1900–1929); Newington Free Church (1843–1900)
- Status: Active
- Founded: 1985

Architecture
- Functional status: Active
- Architect(s): David Cousin; Henry & Maclennan
- Style: Gothic Revival
- Completed: 1843

Clergy
- Pastor: Rupert Ward

Listed Building – Category B
- Official name: The King's Hall, (Formerly St Paul's Newington Church of Scotland) 41A South Clerk Street
- Designated: 29 April 1977
- Reference no.: LB27504

The King's Hall is a church in Newington, Edinburgh, Scotland. Constructed as Newington Free Church in 1843, it is now used by Community Church Edinburgh: an independent evangelical congregation.

The church was founded by factions from Liberton and Newington Parish Church, who had joined the Free Church at the Disruption of 1843. Its first minister was James Begg. The congregation joined the United Free Church in 1900 and the Church of Scotland in 1929 as Newington East Parish Church. McCrie-Roxburgh united with the church in 1920 and, in 1942, the congregation united with St Paul's Church in St Leonard's to form St Paul's Newington Parish Church. In 1984, the Church of Scotland congregation united with Kirk o' Field Parish Church and the buildings were sold to an independent evangelical congregation, Edinburgh City Fellowship, which has been known as Community Church Edinburgh since 2000. Between 1986 and 2007, the church buildings also housed Regius School: an independent Christian school.

The church's building was designed by David Cousin and constructed in 1843. Its present appearance is largely due to a major renovation of 1907 by Henry & Maclennan. Since 1977, the building has been Category B listed.

== St Paul's Newington ==
=== Early Years: 1843–1929 ===
Newington Free Church was formed at the Disruption of 1843. Although David Runciman, minister of Newington Parish Church had remained in the established church, many of the congregation, including four elders, had joined the newly established Free Church. The congregation secured a site for a new church on South Clerk Street and were joined by four elders from Liberton and their minister, James Begg. Begg and the Free congregation of Liberton had been unable to find a site in their village. By 10 November the same year, the new church was opened.

The church was designed by David Cousin. Originally situated among green fields, the building was soon surrounded as the city grew. Four years after the opening, Cousin converted the east end of the church as a school. An organ by C. & F. Hamilton was added in 1902 and rebuilt by Eustace Ingram in 1908. In 1907, the church's interior was altered to accommodate an organ and its façade remodelled in the late Scottish Gothic style. This renovation was mostly funded by a distiller, Duncan Stewart, earning the church the local nickname "The Whisky Kirk". From its foundation to the 1870s, the congregation supported missionary work in Causewayside. It also supported a school on Causewayside, which remained under church control even after the Education (Scotland) Act 1872 brought other church schools under state control.

The congregation supported the union of the Free Church and the United Presbyterian Church and, like most Free congregations, joined the newly formed United Free Church in 1900. On uniting with McCrie-Roxburgh in 1920, the congregation retained the name Newington. At the union of the United Free Church with the Church of Scotland in 1929, however, the congregation adopted the name Newington East Parish Church to differentiate it from the nearby Newington Parish Church.

=== Later years: 1929–1984 ===
In the interwar period, the church's congregation had been declining and its finances were deteriorating. The minister, Andrew Gilchrist, agreed to retire in 1942. This allowed the union of St Paul's and Newington East to form St Paul's Newington on 4 October the same year. The local population and church membership continued to decline and the Newington St Paul's considered union with Newington and St Leonard's in 1956 and 1972, with College in 1961, and with Salisbury in 1967. The same year, the Presbytery of Edinburgh proposed a six-way union of congregations to include St Paul's Newington with Newington and St Leonard's; Charteris-Pleasance; Nicolson Street; Buccleuch; and St Margaret's, Dumbiedykes. This proved too complex.

Newington was the site of an early ecumenical joint council of churches. The council proposed an ecumenical partnership with St Peter's Episcopal Church but this was rejected by St Paul's Newington's kirk session. The congregation rejected an offer by the South Side Community Care Project to use the halls as a staffed day centre. At the departure of St Paul's Newington's last minister, Alexander Cassells, the Presbytery of Edinburgh offered the congregation dissolution or union with Kirk o' Field. Despite briefly considering a cross-denominational union with Dalkeith Road United Reformed Church, the congregation accepted the latter offer and joined Kirk o' Field on 6 May 1984.

=== Ministers ===
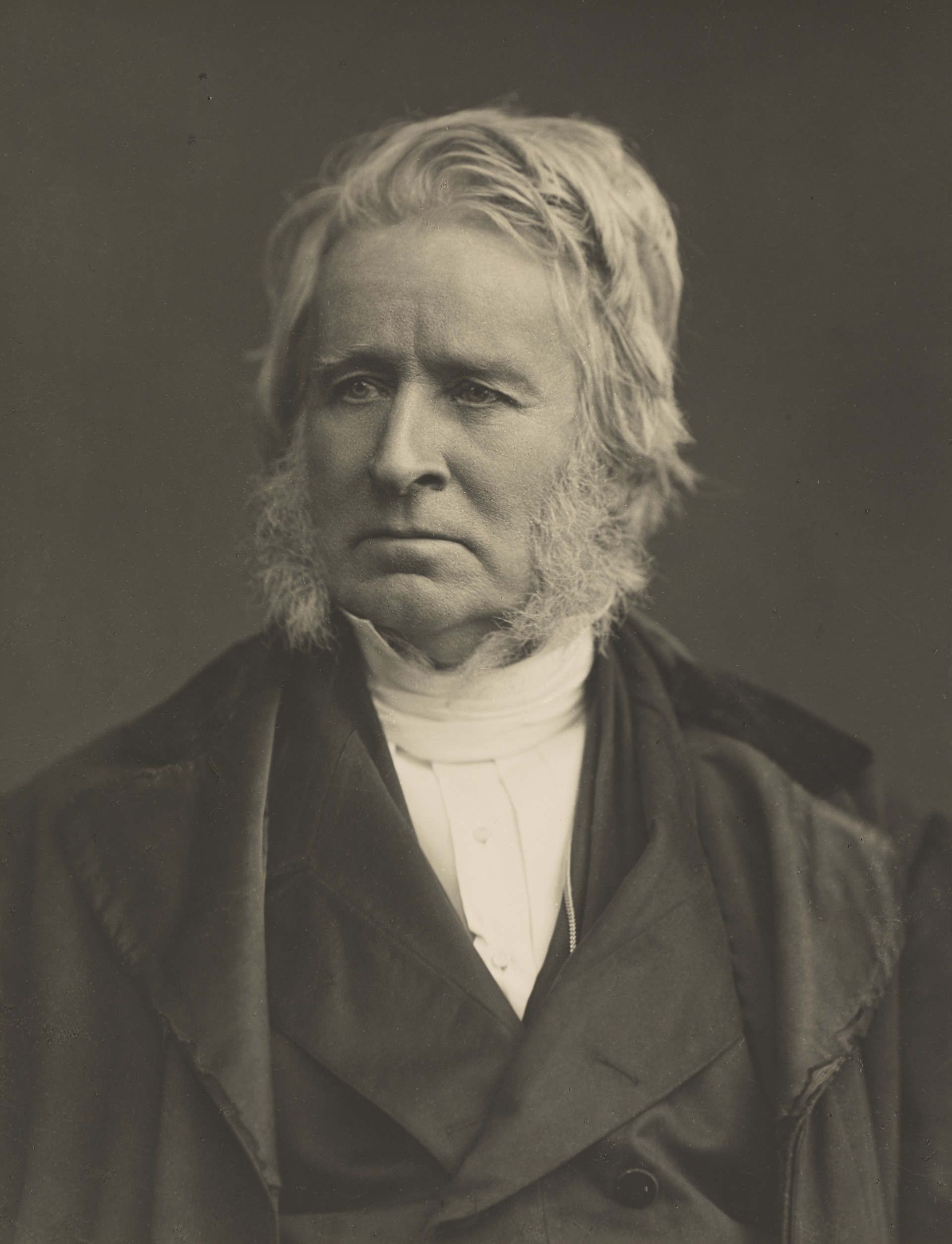
James Begg: first minister of Newington Free Church

The following ministers served Newington Free Church (1843–1900); Newington United Free Church (1900–1929); Newington East Parish Church (1929–1942); and St Paul's Newington Parish Church (1942–1984):

- 1843–1883 James Begg
- 1885–1904 William Whyte Smith
- 1904–1909 Daniel Lamont
- 1909–1942 Andrew Gilchrist
- 1943–1961 James Alexander Bremner
- 1961–1967 John MacLeod
- 1967–1983 Alexander Ketchen Cassells

== King's Hall ==
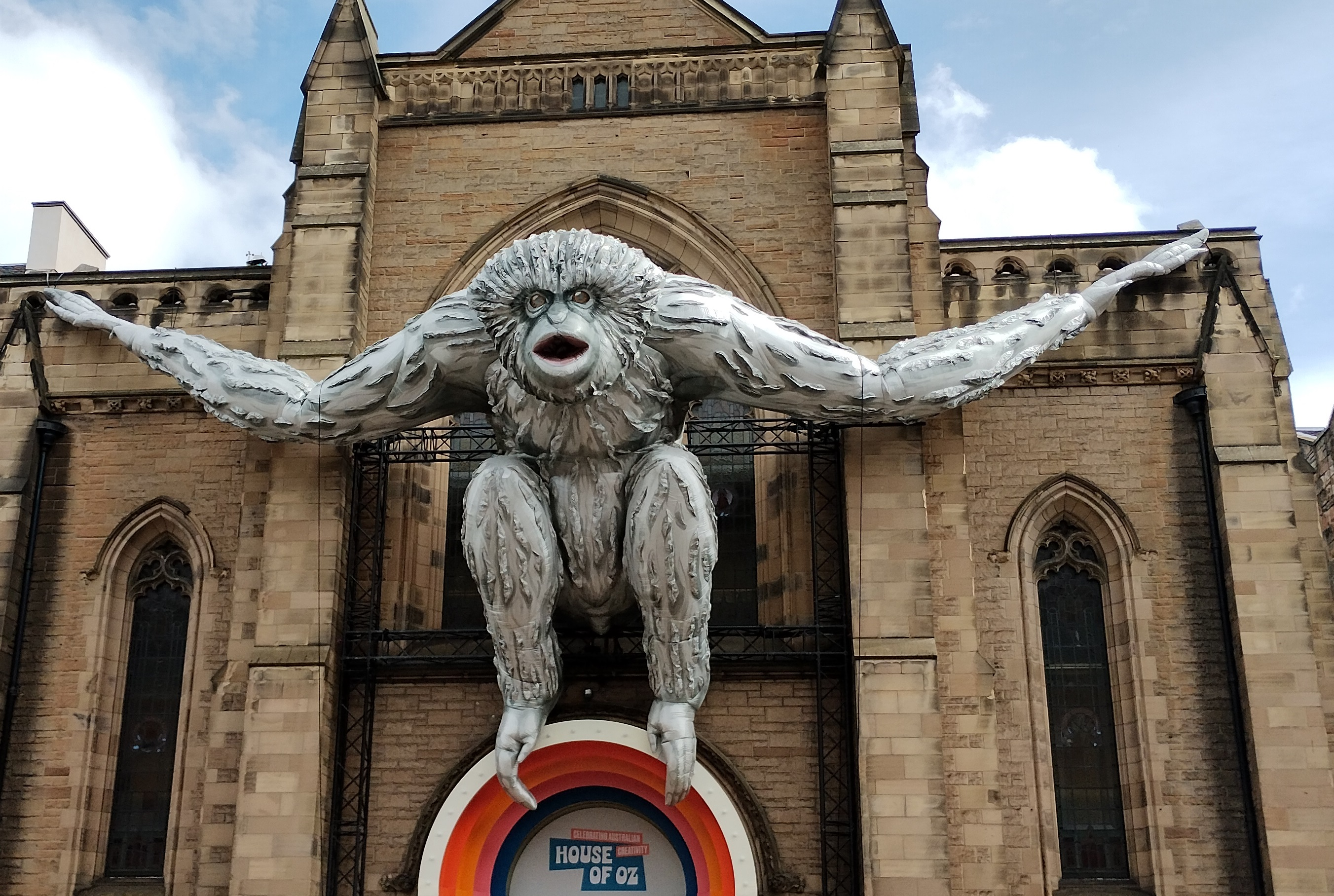
An inflatable gibbon sculpture (created by Lisa Roet) mounted on the King's Hall as part of the 2023 Edinburgh Festival Fringe.

After St Paul's Newington's union with Kirk o' Field in 1984, the buildings were sold to Edinburgh City Fellowship, an independent evangelical church, for £60,000. The new congregation took possession of the buildings in January 1985 and subsequently reordered the sanctuary as a multi-purpose auditorium. The Edinburgh City Fellowship had been founded in the late 1970s as an offshoot of City Temple: a Pentecostal church.

From 1986, the church operated Regius School, an independent Christian school, in the halls of the church. It relocated to Musselburgh in 2007. After an internal disgreement in 2000, the congregation changed its name to Community Church Edinburgh. Initially led by Colin Symes, the congregation leadership transitioned to Rupert Ward in 2014 with Symes retiring from paid ministry in 2020.

Community Church Edinburgh defines itself as "Jesus focused", "Presence loving", "Scripture centred", "Kingdom orientated", "Spirit led", and "Missionally committed". The congregation's activities include Sunday worship as well as community groups and a food bank. The church's leadership team is led by Rupert Ward. Bethel Edinburgh Sozo, an "inner healing ministry", is also operated in the King's Hall by members of Community Church Edinburgh.

During the Edinburgh Fringe, the building is operated by Summerhall as a performance venue.

== Buildings ==
The church was designed by David Cousin and completed in 1843. Four years after the opening, Cousin converted the east end of the church as a school and raised the interior to accommodate galleries. In 1907, the church was altered by Henry & Maclennan, who added a chancel to the interior and remodelled its façade remodelled in the late Scottish Gothic style.

The façade, as remodelled in 1907 is symmetrical with a central bay of consisting of pitched gable and four-light window of curvilinear tracery at above a round-arched door. This bay is heavily buttressed and flanked by bays imitating the ends of aisles with straight, pierced parapets above single-light windows. The interior consists of four bays with an arcade of cast iron pillars supporting a U-shaped gallery. At the east end is a chancel added in 1907.

The church was inscribed as a Category B listed building on 29 April 1977.
