= James Begg =

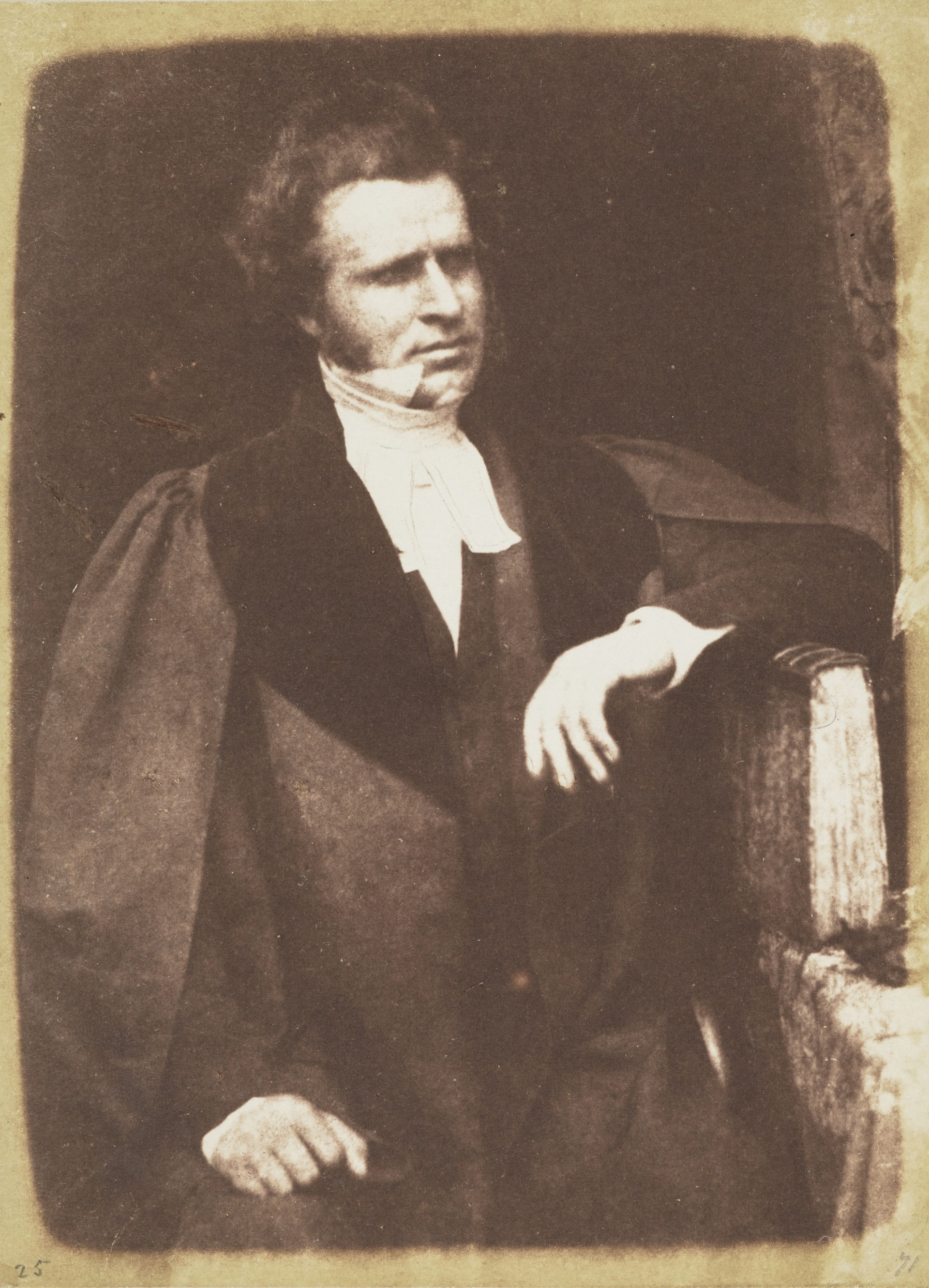
- James Begg by Hill & Adamson

Personal details
- Born: 31 October 1808
- Died: 29 September 1883 (aged 74)

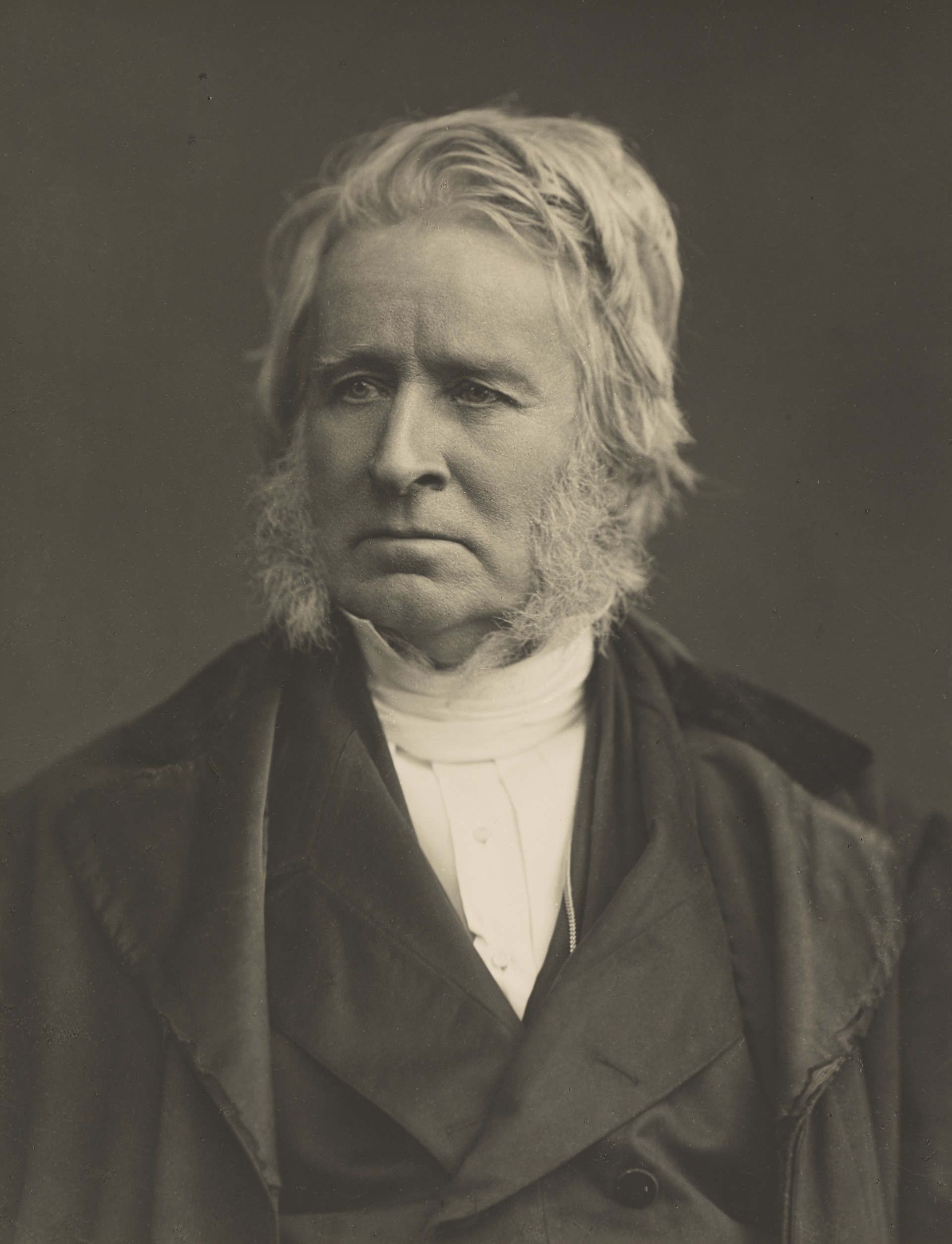
Rev James Begg D.D., George Square by John Moffat

James Begg (31 October 1808 in New Monkland, Lanarkshire, Scotland – 29 September 1883) was a minister of the Free Church of Scotland who served as Moderator of the General Assembly 1865/66.

== Life ==
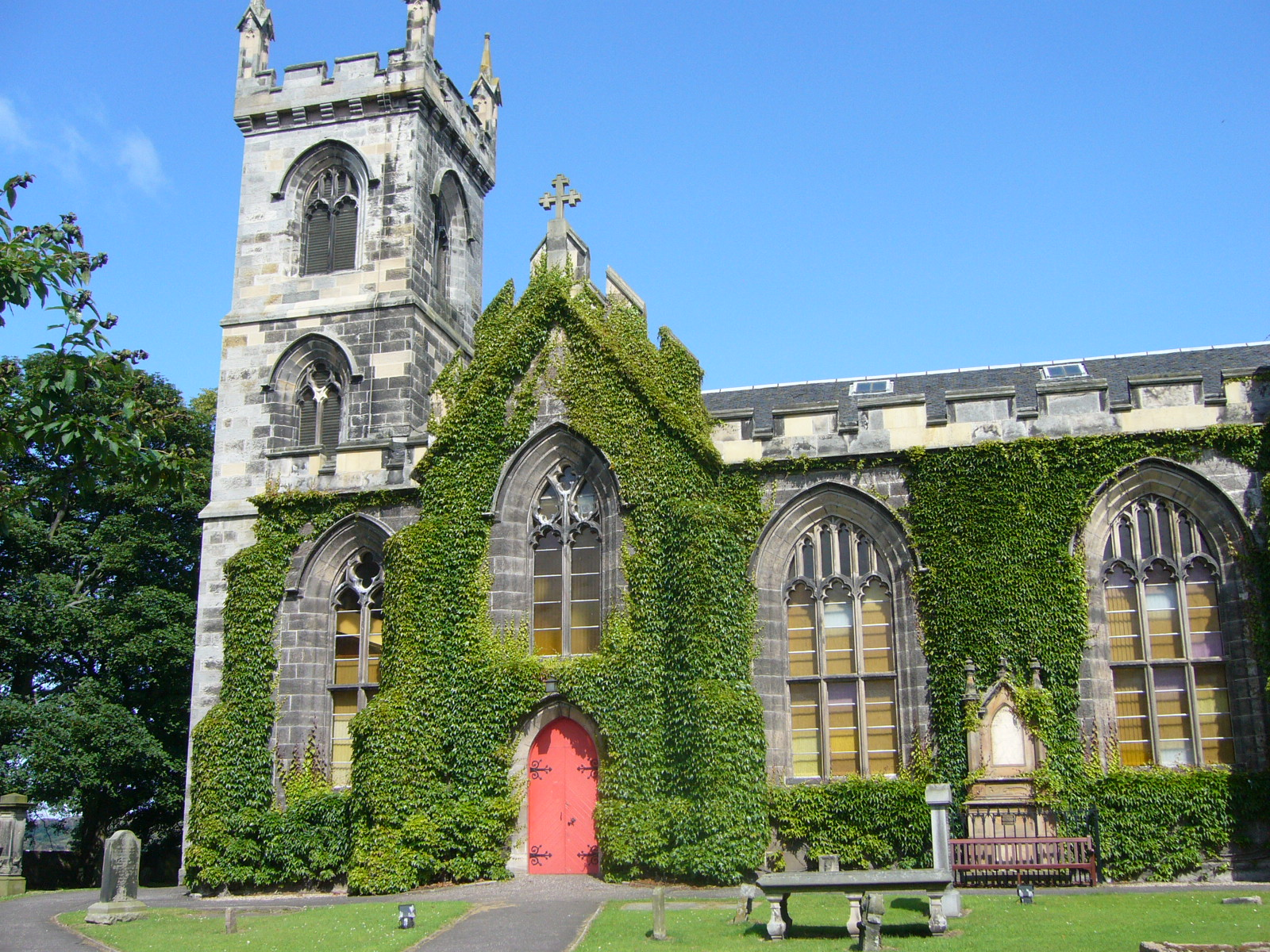
Liberton Kirk

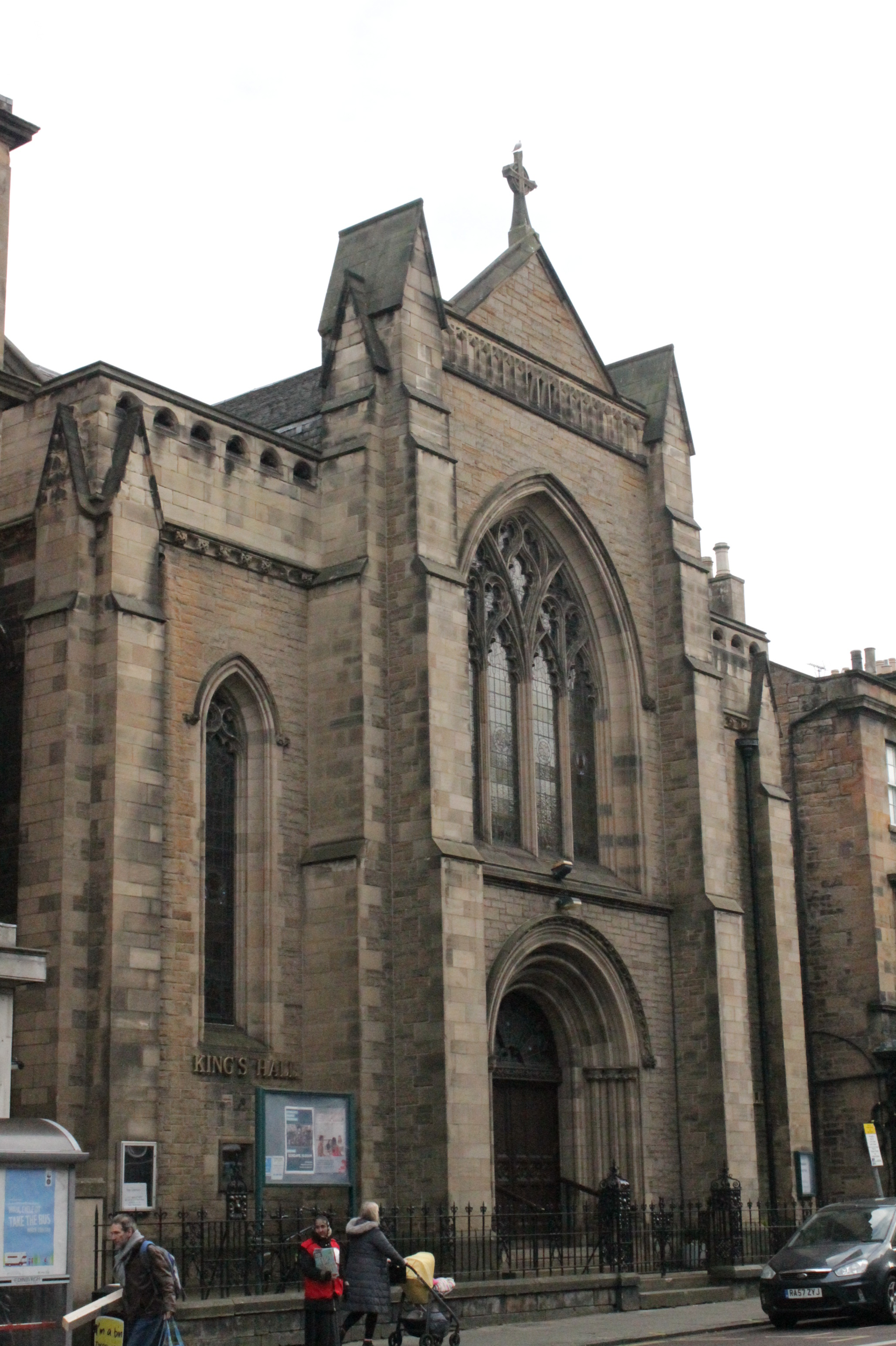
Newington Free Church, now known as the King's Hall in Edinburgh

He was born in the manse at New Monkland the son of James Begg of the Church of Scotland.

He studied Divinity at Glasgow University graduating MA in 1824 and was licensed by the Presbytery of Hamilton in 1829 and was ordained as a minister by the Church of Scotland at Maxwelltown in Dumfriesshire in 1830. In 1831 he became assistant to Rev Dr Jones at Lady Glenorchy's Church in Edinburgh, and in 1832 moved to the Middle Parish Church in Paisley before being translated back to Edinburgh to serve Liberton parish in 1835.

Begg left the established Church of Scotland at the Disruption of 1843. He then became a minister of the Free Church of Scotland, serving Newington Free Church, but he was branded a 'disrupter of the peace' within the Free Church itself. The church was one of the first built in Edinburgh after the Disruption and was designed by David Cousin in 1843. Begg was then living at 15 Minto Street. The church later secured a manse for him at 34 Blacket Place. In 1865 he succeeded Very Rev Patrick Fairbairn as Moderator of the General Assembly.

Lafayette College awarded him an honorary Doctor of Divinity in 1847.

Begg was a key figure in the foundation of the Scottish Reformation Society in 1850 and the Protestant Alliance, and was known not only for anti-Roman Catholicism but also his concern for working and living conditions. He was editor for The Bulwark or The Reformation Journal for 21 years from its beginning July, 1851. He also wrote frequently to The Witness, Hugh Miller's newspaper.

Together with Thomas Chalmers, Begg was a major influence behind the colony houses of Edinburgh, which were built between 1850 and 1910 as homes for artisans and skilled working-class families by philanthropic model dwellings companies. In the late 1850s, alarm at the high illegitimacy rates in the northeast counties led Begg to launch a moral crusade against the accommodation of unmarried male farm servants in bothies.

== Artistic recognition ==
In 1869 he was portrayed by Sir Daniel Macnee.

== Publications ==
Not to be confused with James A. Begg (1800–1868), Scottish writer on prophecy and promulgator of the seventh-day Sabbath, born in Paisley.

- Are You Prepared to Die? (1845)
- How to Promote and Preserve the True Beauty of Edinburgh (1849)
- Pauperism and the Poor Laws (1849)
- Handbook of Popery James Begg (the Younger.) - 1852
- Reform in the Free Church (1855)
- The Art of Preaching (1863)
- Happy Homes for Working Men, and How to Get Them (London, 1866)
- Free Church Principles
- A Treatise for the Times on Worship
- The Bothy System

== Family ==
He married twice: Margaret Campbell in 1835 and Maria Faithfull, daughter of Rev Ferdinand Faithfull of Headley in Surrey, in 1846.

By his second marriage his children included William Begg, better known as actor "Walter Bentley" (b.1849).
