= Queen's Hall, Edinburgh =

The Queen's Hall
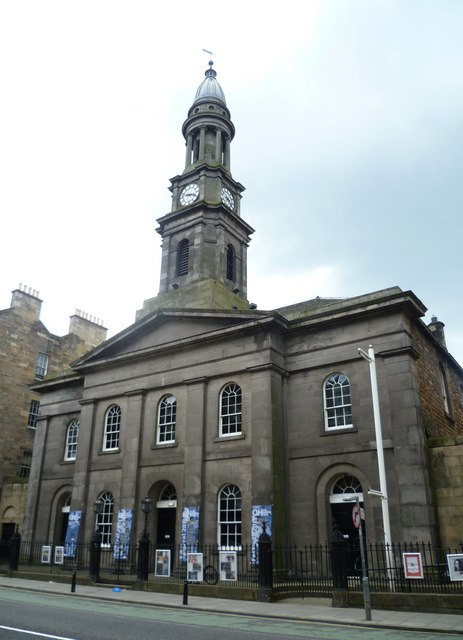
- Interactive map of the The Queen's Hall area
- Former names: Newington & St Leonard's Parish Church (1932–1976); Newington Parish Church (1834–1932); Hope Park Chapel (1824–1834)

General information
- Status: Active
- Architectural style: Neoclassical
- Location: Edinburgh, Scotland, 85-89 Clerk Street; Edinburgh; EH8 9JG
- Coordinates: 55°56′28.51″N 3°10′53.97″W
- Named for: Elizabeth II
- Groundbreaking: 1823
- Completed: 1824
- Renovated: 1978–1979

Height
- Height: 35 metres (115 ft)

Technical details
- Floor count: 2

Design and construction
- Architect: Robert Brown

Renovating team
- Architect: Larry Rolland
- Renovating firm: Robert Hurd & Partners
- Main contractor: Melville, Dundas & Whitson

Listed Building – Category A
- Official name: South Clerk Street, The Queen's Hall
- Designated: 14 December 1970
- Reference no.: LB27176

The Queen's Hall is a performance venue in the Southside, Edinburgh, Scotland. The building opened in 1824 as Hope Park Chapel and reopened as the Queen's Hall in 1979.

Hope Park Chapel opened as a chapel of ease within the West Kirk parish in 1824. The chapel became a parish church with the name Newington Parish Church in 1834. The congregation supported the creation of a mission church in St Leonard's in 1878. The two congregations united to form Newington and St Leonard's Parish Church in 1932. The church was dissolved in 1976 and the building was purchased by the Scottish Philharmonic Society. It was reopened as a performance venue in 1979 by Elizabeth II, after whom the building was renamed. The hall has hosted artists including Nina Simone, Nick Cave, and Adele. In 2018, the hall estimated it welcomed 90,000 visitors across 200 concerts annually. It is the only major venue to host events for all of the Edinburgh International Festival, the Edinburgh Fringe, and the Edinburgh Jazz & Blues Festival.

The building was designed in the neoclassical style by Robert Brown and was adapted for use as a performance venue by Larry Rolland of Robert Hurd & Partners. It now has a capacity of up to 900. Notable features include two large, 18th-century boards displaying the Lord's Prayer, Creed, and Ten Commandments. It has been a Category A listed building since 14 December 1970.

== Newington and St Leonard's Parish Church ==
=== Hope Park Chapel (1822−1834) ===
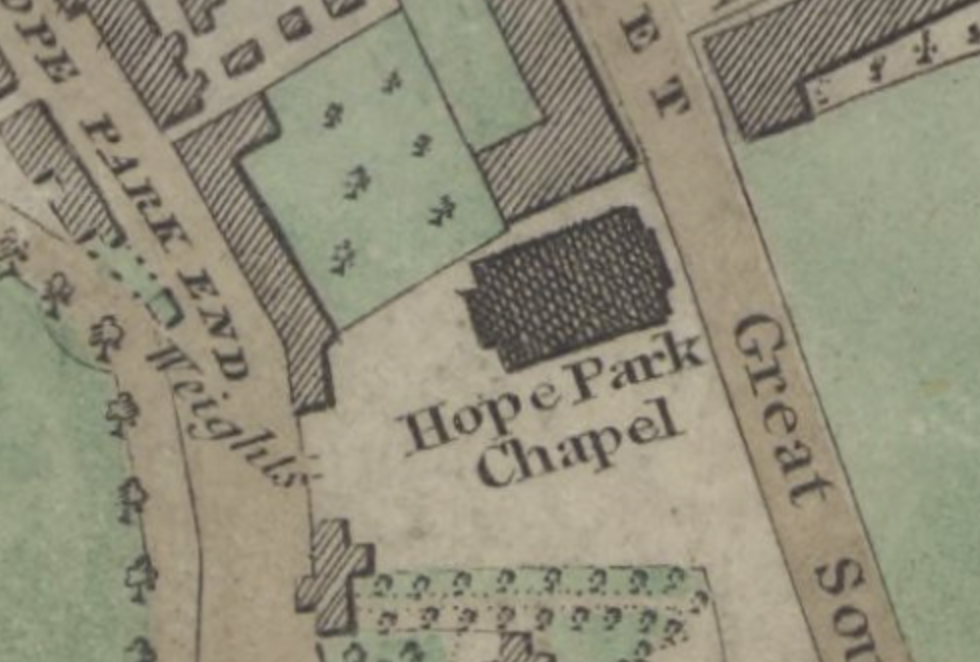
Hope Park Chapel on a map of 1825, showing its open surroundings at the time of its erection

The south-eastern portion of the West Kirk Parish had been served since the 1750s by the Buccleuch Chapel. By 1822, however, population growth in the Southside and Newington spurred West Kirk session to appoint a committee of investigation to assess the need for a new place of worship in the southern districts of the parish. The commission found the parish had a population of 20,250 but only 6,274 seats in established churches.

The session launched an appeal to support a new chapel and, within eleven days, secured £630 in donations and almost £2,000 in loans. Despite initial difficulties in securing a site, a location on South Clerk Street with access to the Meadows was purchased.

The foundation stone was laid in 1823 and the church opened in 1824 as a chapel of ease within St Cuthbert's Parish with seats for 1,700. When the church's first minister, Robert Gordon, left to become minister of the New North Church in 1825, one candidate to replace him was Edward Irving. Irving rejected the congregation's call but gave a series of morning lectures in the church in 1829.

=== Newington Parish Church ===
In 1834, during the ministry of David Runciman, the chapel became the church of a parish quoad sacra as Newington Parish Church. Runciman remained in the established church at the Disruption of 1843; however, many of the congregation joined the newly formed Free Church and four elders from Newington joined four elders from Liberton Kirk and their minister, James Begg, to establish Newington Free Church nearby, on the opposite side of South Clerk Street.

After Runciman's departure as minister of Newington Parish Church in 1844, the congregation was without a regular minister until 1859, when James Elder Cumming became minister and the parish's status was recognised by the Court of Teinds. An organ, by Forster & Andrews, was installed in 1873, it was only the second organ installed in a Church of Scotland building in Edinburgh after Old Greyfriars.

=== Mission and St Leonard's Parish Church ===
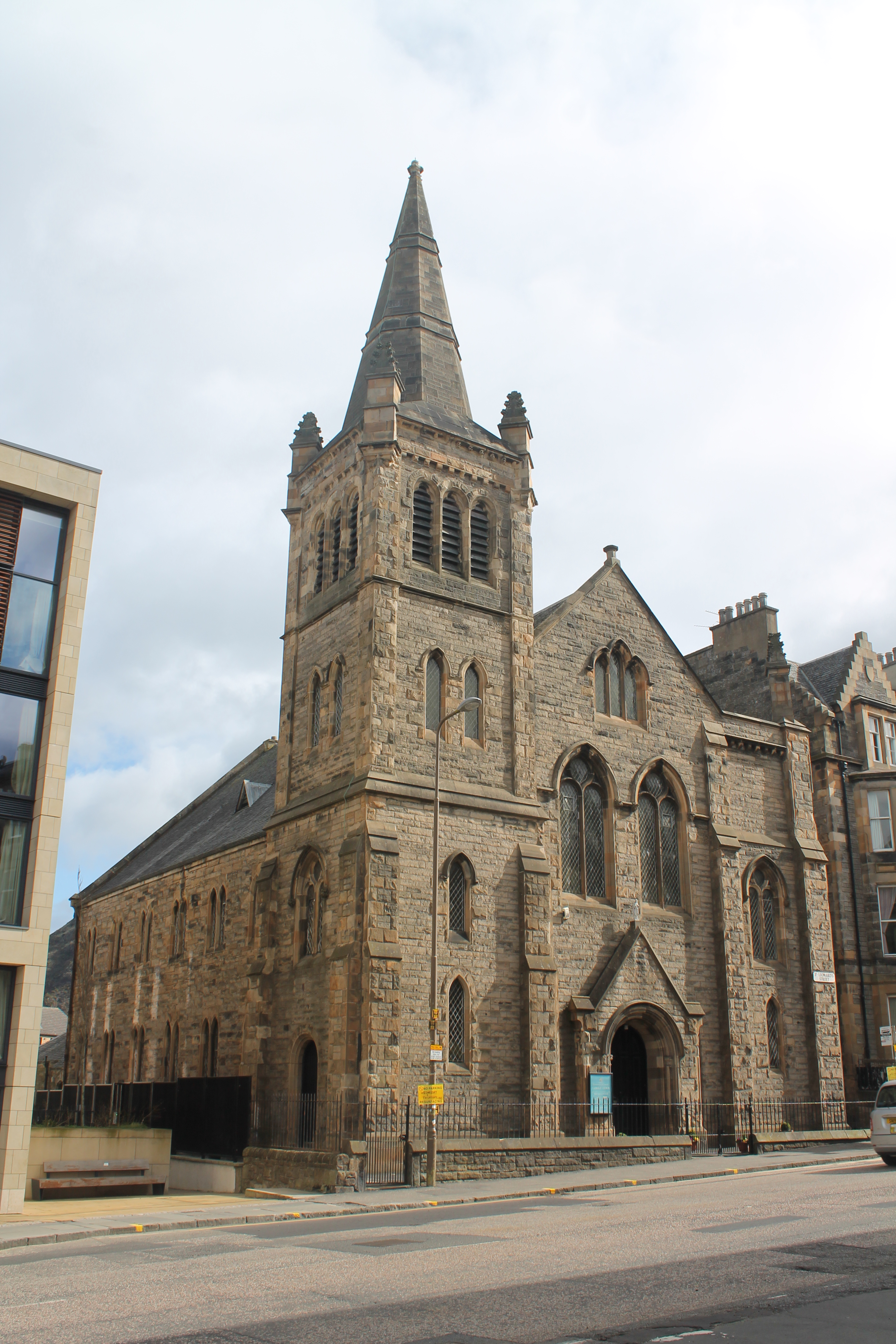
St Leonard's Parish Church opened in 1879 and united with Newington in 1932.

The parish covered the affluent villas and terraces of the Southside and Newington as well as the deprived area around Causewayside. John Alison, minister of Newington between 1871 and 1898, described part of the street as "the worst bit of Edinburgh". An international trade slump in the 1850s hollowed-out the area's once thriving weaving industry and deprivation and overcrowding became common.

The church founded a school on Dalkeith Road, opposite Holyrood Park Road and supported a missionary hall in Causewayside until 1866. This was followed by the appointment of a missionary in that area, who operated from the Burnett Buildings, which were known as "The Brickie". A student missionary was appointed in 1890 and new premises were secured in 1899. On 2 April 1916, these were damaged in a Zeppelin raid. Newington Social Union was established at the Brickie in 1892. At the end of the 19th century, the church also supported a district nurse and a Dorcas society. Between 1860 and 1892, the church served the girls of the Trades Maiden Hospital, who sat on the south side of the gallery during worship. The boys of Robertson's Academy, off East Preston Street, sat opposite.

The congregation also addressed its parish's growing population by contributing £1,500 towards the construction of a new church in St Leonard's. The foundation stone was laid on 1 June 1878 by the Earl of Rosslyn, Lord High Commissioner to the General Assembly of the Church of Scotland in the presence of John Tulloch, Moderator of the General Assembly of the Church of Scotland. St Leonard's Church opened on 6 April 1879. The building was designed by John Lessels and, at its opening, had space for 1,000 worshippers as well as an organ by Forster & Andrews. On 21 November 1879, the church was gutted by fire but was soon rebuilt, reopening on 21 May 1880 and becoming a charge quoad sacra in 1883 with a parish detached from St Cuthbert's.

=== Reunion (1929–1976) ===
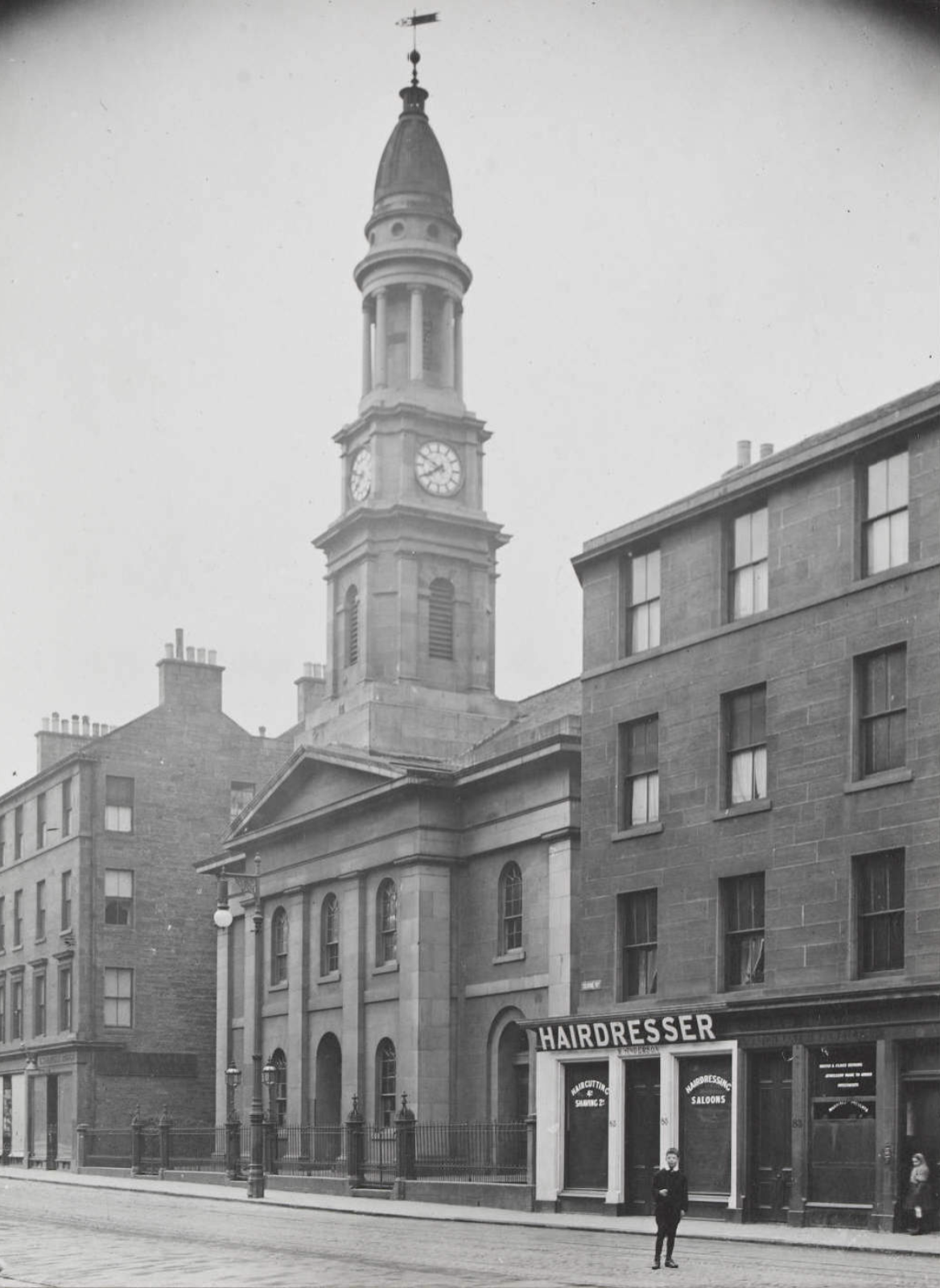
Newington Parish Church in 1914

In 1929, the Church of Scotland united with the United Free Church, which had itself been formed by the union of the Free and United Presbyterian churches in 1900. The union resulted in 13 parish churches within the area between Holyrood Park and the Meadows, south of the old city wall. As the Southside's population was beginning to decline, amalgamation and closure of some of these churches became a matter of necessity. In 1932, Hugh Cameron resigned as minister of Newington due to ill health and William Liddle, minister of St Leonard's, led the new, united charge of Newington and St Leonard's Parish Church. The St Leonard's buildings were sold to the Church of Christ for £3,000 and the funds used from its sale were directed to the construction of a new church hall at Newington, designed by J. Jeffrey Waddell and opened on 8 December 1934. (Note: The Churches of Christ congregation was known as Dalkeith Road Church of Christ, then Dalkeith Road United Reformed Church when, like most other Churches of Christ in Britain, the congregation joined the United Reformed Church in 1981. In 1992, the United Reformed congregation merged with Augustine Congregational Church on George IV Bridge, forming Augustine United Church. Since that year, the former St Leonard's buildings have been used by the Society of Saint Pius X under the name St Margaret's and St Leonard's Catholic Church. The current congregation has also inherited two war memorial vases which, at their departure in 1932, the St Leonard's congregation gifted to the Church of Christ.)

In 1941, the Newington Social Union ceased operations and, in 1943, the missionary halls in Causewayside, which the church had let to Edinburgh Coroporation since 1931, were sold. The same year, a former café on Melville Terrace was purchased to serve as a youth centre. In 1959, a restoration of the church under Ian Gordon Lindsay was completed.

In the post-war period, the Southside's population continued to decline, as did the congregations of the area's churches. In 1967, the Presbytery of Edinburgh proposed a six-way union of congregations to include Newington and St Leonard's with Buccleuch; Charteris-Pleasance; Nicolson Street; St Paul's Newington; and St Margaret's, Dumbiedykes. This proved too complex but a five-fold union, excluding St Paul's Newington was requested by the General Assembly the following year. The congregations of Charteris-Pleasance and St Margaret's supported the move while the others rejected it. Newington and St Leonard's removed itself from negotiations. The congregation continued for seven years more before being dissolved on 31 July 1976.

=== Ministers ===
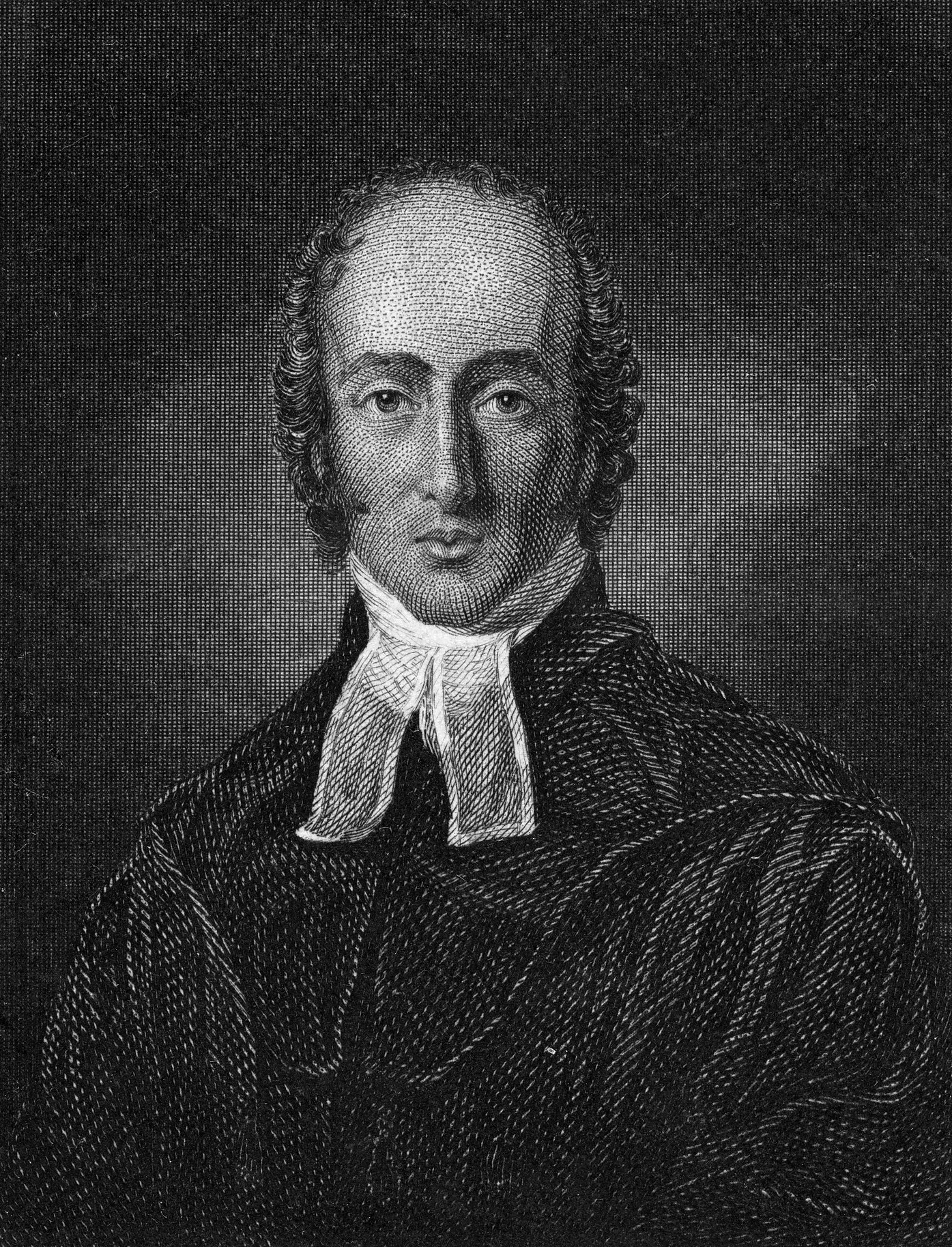
Robert Gordon: the congregation's first minister

The following ministers served Hope Park Chapel (1824–1834); Newington Parish Church (1834–1932); and Newington and St Leonard's Parish Church (1932–1976):

1824–1825 Robert Gordon
1826–1828 John Forbes
1829–1844 David Runciman
1859–1871 James Elder Cumming
1871–1898 John Alison
1898–1932 Hugh Cameron
1932–1940 William Liddle
1940–1956 Edwin Sprott Towill
1957–1976 Matthew Shields

The following ministers served St Leonard's Parish Church (1879–1932):

1879–1903 Lewis Frederick Armitage
1904–1912 John Calder
1913–1932 William Liddle (Note: Liddle became minister of the united charge of Newington and St Leonard's Parish Church.)

== Queen's Hall ==
=== History ===
At the time of Newington and St Leonard's Parish Church's closure, the Scottish Baroque Ensemble, the Scottish Chamber Orchestra, and the Scottish Philharmonic Singers were in search of a permanent base. The Scottish Philharmonic Society commissioned architects Robert Hurd & Partners to draw up plans to convert the church into a concert hall. These were accepted by the City of Edinburgh Council over a rival proposal to convert the building into offices.

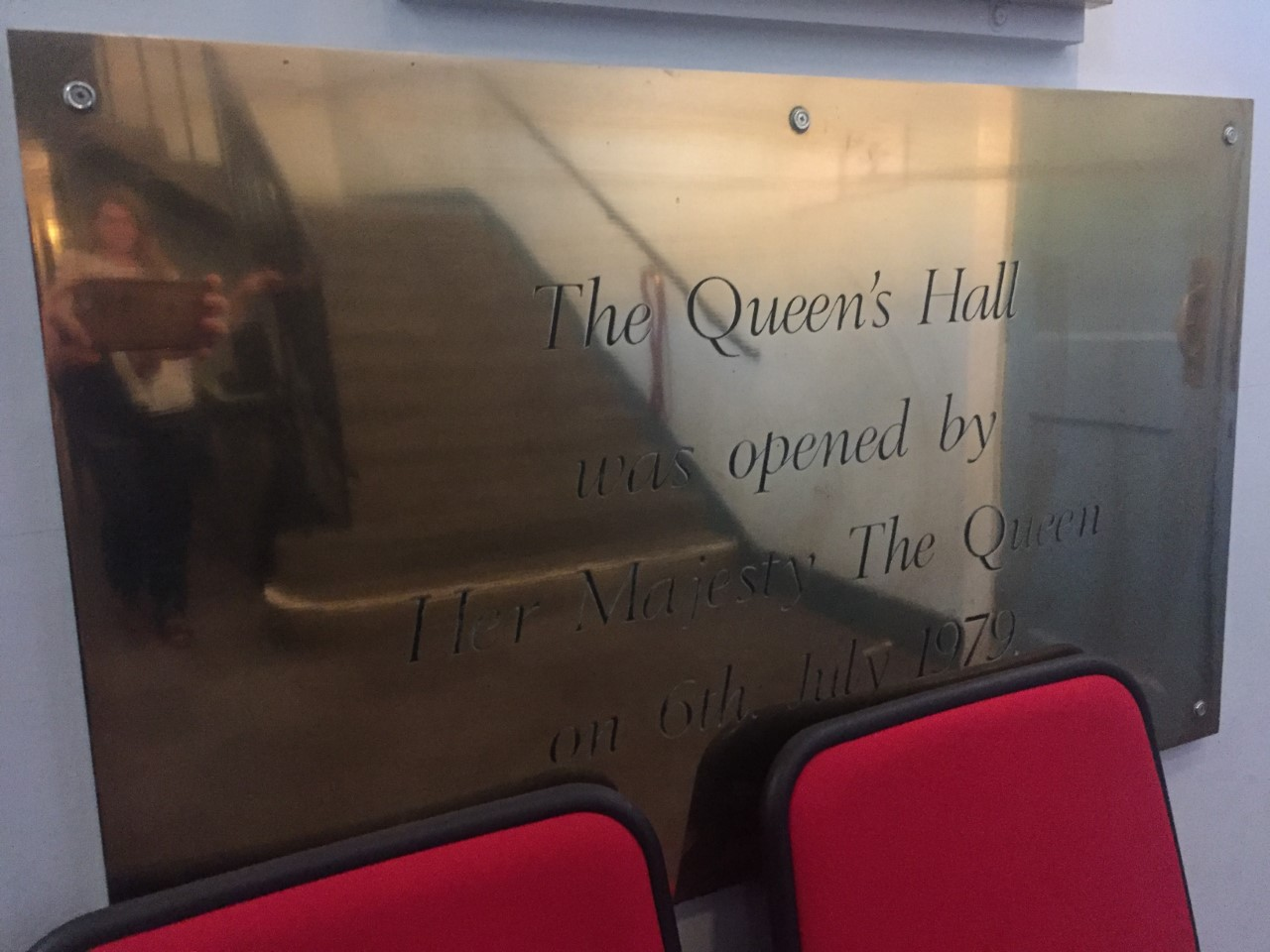
A plaque in the hall's vestibule marking its opening on 6 July 1979 by Queen Elizabeth: the hall's namesake

On top of a provisional grant of £35,000 from the Scottish Arts Council, a funding appeal was launched in 1977 and had secured £100,000 in individual donations as well as £50,000 from the city council. Larry Rolland of Robert Hurd & Partners was chosen as architect with Melville, Dundas & Whitson as contractors; work began in February 1978. During the construction, the project attracted further funding from sources including a benefit concert by James Galway and a gala at Hopetoun House. This culminated in a £200,000 grant from Lothian Regional Council, this allowed further work to take place, delaying the completion of the project until June 1979.

Ahead of the hall's opening, the name The Queen's Hall was chosen to evoke Edinburgh's royal associations and to reference the memory London's Queen's Hall. Suggested names which included "Philharmonic" or which evoked the building's ecclesiastical history were discounted.

The conversion of the hall was completed in time for its official opening by Elizabeth II on 6 July 1979. Work on the building continued subsequent to its opening. Further works included the opening of the Canada Room in 1982, now known as the Tunnell Room; the addition of a mezzanine level to the former hall in 1991; and, in 1996, the installation of a piano lift, new lighting, and carpets along with the refurbishment of the seating.

In August 2003, the hall launched an appeal for funds and announced in November of the same year that Richard Murphy Architects had been commissioned to upgrade the hall. Murphy's plan involved the demolition of all but the hall's façade and steeple and the creation of a new hall to the rear with capacity for 1,200. David Black, an architectural historian who, as chairman of the South Side Association, opposed plans to turn the building into offices in the 1970s, criticised the plans to redevelop the building. In May 2004, the proposals were dropped. Adrian Harris, the hall's chief executive claimed the proposals could not accommodate extra facilities desired by the Scottish Chamber Orchestra and that a new hall at a new site was then being explored. In 2006, a report for Edinburgh City Council by consultancy Art Portfolio suggested a new hall on the waterfront at Granton or Leith to replace the Queen's Hall as the Scottish Chamber Orchestra's base. The plan was supported by Herbert Coutts, the city's director of leisure and culture, but criticised by Richard Murphy.

=== Today ===
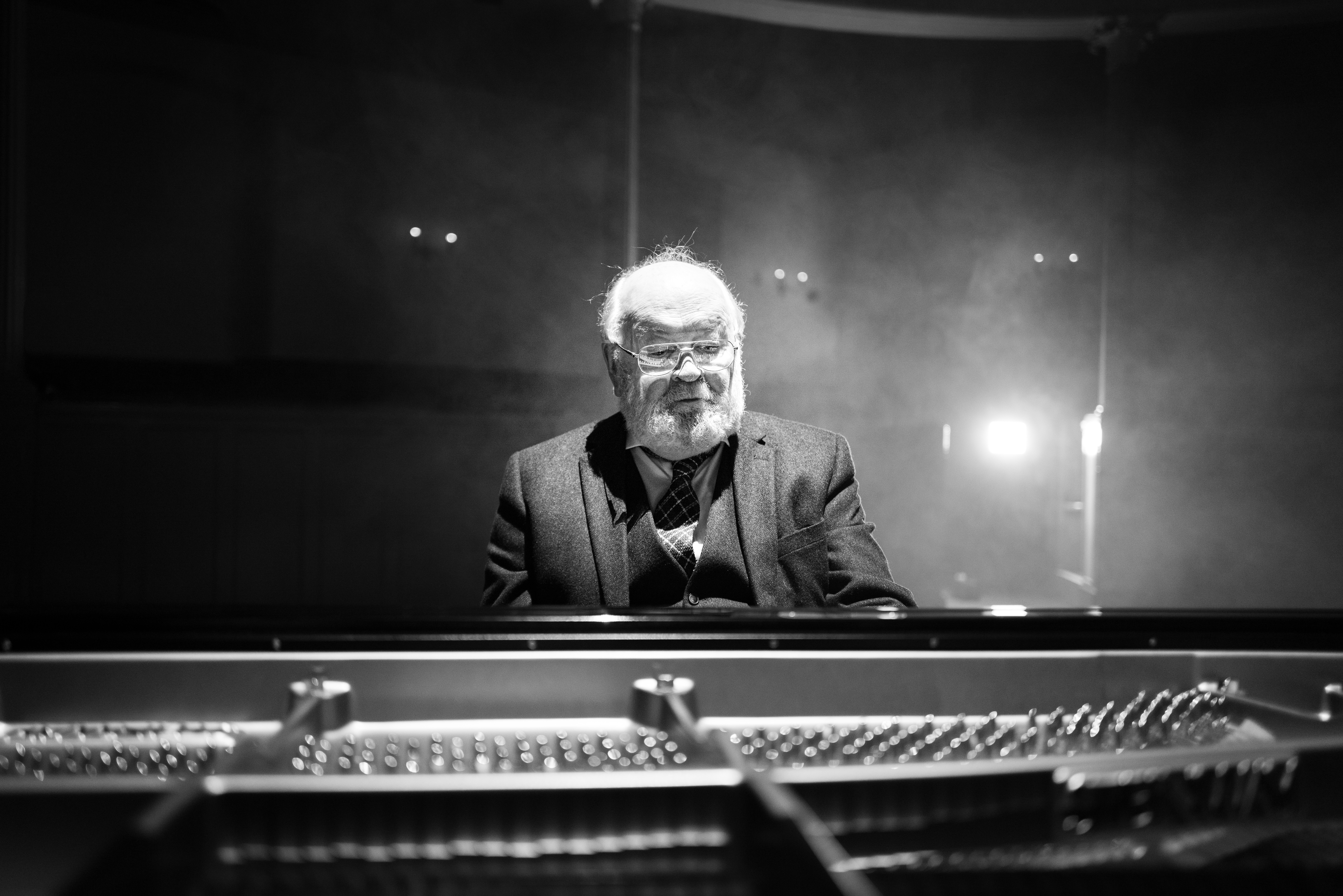
Pianist David Wilde performing at the Queen's Hall in 2020

In March 2017, the hall announced it had secured a £650,000 Scottish Government grant towards a £3,000,000 renovation, which it aimed to have completed by the building's 200th anniversary in 2023. In May that year, Mill Architects released plans to increase the flow of natural light to the interior while expanding the foyer and renovating seating. By August 2018, completed works included the improvement of the bar areas and a restoration of the exterior. These works were supported by the Scottish Government and by Historic Environment Scotland.

From 20 March 2020 to 22 August 2021, the hall was closed due to the COVID-19 pandemic: the longest closure in the venue's history. In January 2021, the hall received money from Historic Environment Scotland's COVID-19 Recovery Fund to improve accessibility and to add new toilet facilities.

The hall has hosted artists including Nina Simone, Nick Cave, and Adele. In 2018, the hall estimated it welcomed 90,000 visitors across 200 concerts annually. It is the only major venue to host events for all of the Edinburgh International Festival, the Edinburgh Fringe, and the Edinburgh Jazz & Blues Festival. The hall can accommodate 900 standing and 801 seated. Facilities for performers include three dressing rooms, a green room, and a production office.

== Building ==
The Queen's Hall was designed in the neoclassical style by Robert Brown. The building was listed as a Category A building on 14 December 1970.

=== Exterior ===
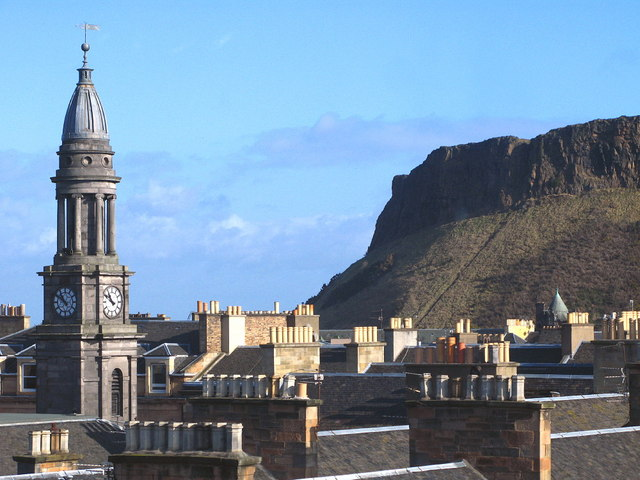
The steeple with the Salisbury Crags in the background

The façade centres on an advanced section of three bays divided by four Doric pilasters beneath a simple pediment. In each bay are two storeys divided by an unadorned course with a round-headed window or door in each storey. Similar bays flank the central section on each side. The round-headed windows and doors are imitated in single-storey screen walls on either side of the building.

A plinth above the central section supports a steeple. This consists of a two-storey, octagonal tower. The cardinal faces are longest with Doric pilasters flanking round-headed louvred openings in the bottom storey and clock faces in the shorter upper storey. Upon these storeys, an Ionic peristyle drum with oculi above supports an elongated dome with vane. George Hay cited this as a "good example" of the domed steeple, which, from the 1820s, came to be viewed as more compatible with neoclassical architecture than the spire. The total height of the steeple is around 35 m (116 ft). It is prominent with the skyline of the Southside.

The façade is finished in ashlar while the side and rear walls are constructed of snecked masonry. The front of the church is enclosed by iron railings with acanthus leaf pinnacles.

George Hay noted similarities between the exterior of the Queen's Hall and those of St Bernard's, Stockbridge by James Milne, completed the same year; and St Mary's, Bellevue by Thomas Brown, completed the following year. These churches all possess similar steeples and pedimented façade. The Buildings of Scotland guide to Edinburgh describes the hall as a "less extravagant" version of St Mary's.

=== Interior ===
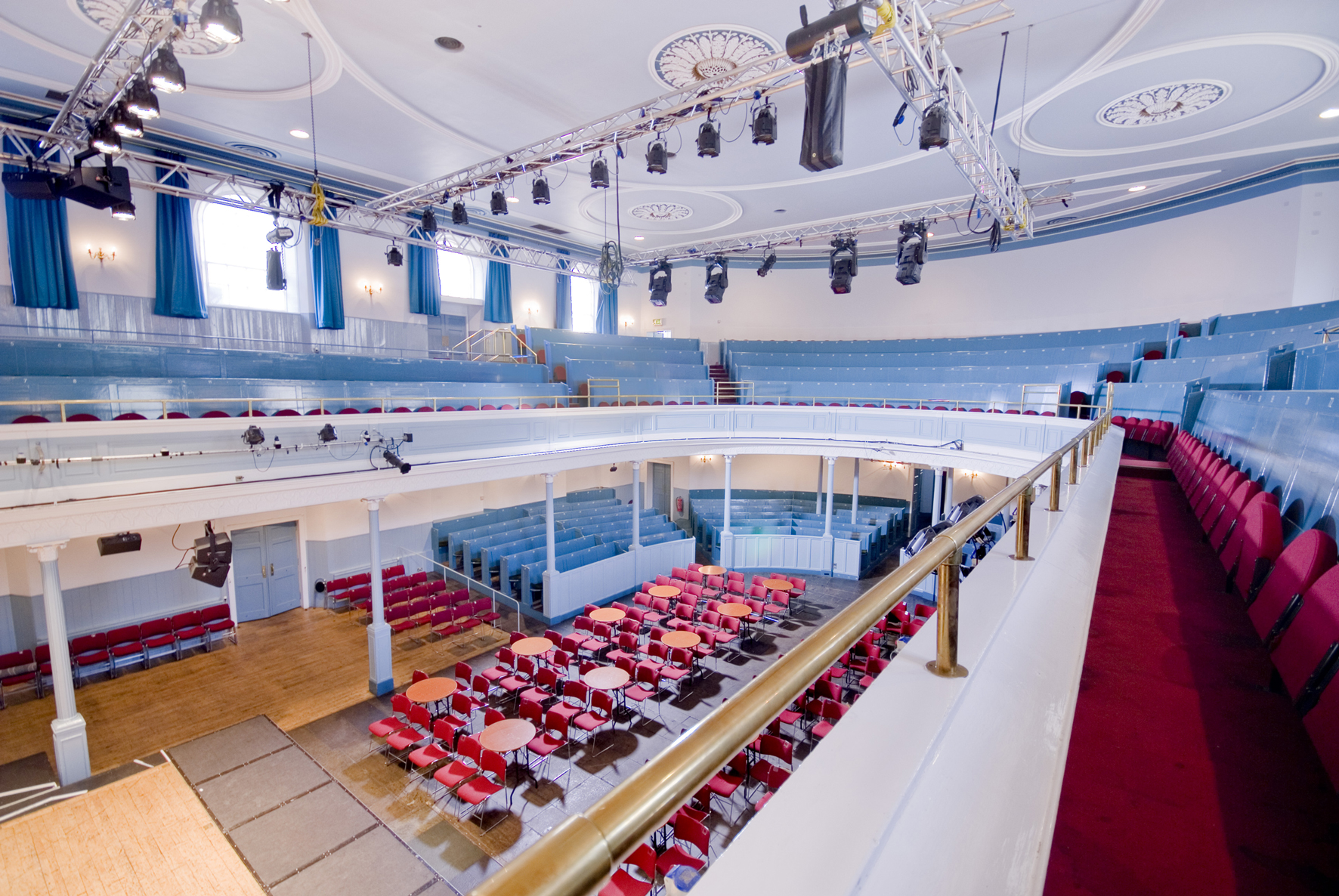
The interior, looking to the rear of the hall

The auditorium is separated from the street by a round vestibule flanked by stair-halls. The auditorium itself is D-shaped and centers on the flat west wall, which includes two tall round-headed windows. Cast iron pillars with acanthus leaf capitals support a U-shaped gallery with round-headed windows above and segmental arched windows below. The flat ceiling incorporates a design of circles and foliaged roses in plaster. The auditorium is 31.1 m (102 ft) long by 22.3 m (73 ft) wide.

=== Alterations ===
In 1955, a restoration by Ian Gordon Lindsay was completed. This included the painting of the interior in bright pastel colours and the reordering of pews to create chapels beneath the galleries. George Hay found similarity in the design to the "orthodox" rectangular layouts of St Bernard's, Stockbridge, and St Mary's, Bellevue.

The building was significantly altered at its conversion to the Queen's Hall in 1978 and 1979 by Larry Rolland of Robert Hurd & Partners. The Buildings of Scotland guide to Edinburgh describes the hall's secularisation as "particularly successful" relative to other converted churches in Edinburgh.

In the auditorium, some pews were removed and others adapted. The removal of the 1873 Forster & Andrews pipe organ from the rear of the gallery allowed the reinstatement of seating there. Double glazing and a modern ventilation system were also installed. An upper extension was added to the former session house and another extension was added to the south-west of the building. The 1934 hall by J. Jeffrey Waddell became a space for smaller concerts as well accommodating a bar and a meeting space known since 1982 as the Lothian Room. The extensions are masked from the street by screen walls flanking the building's façade. These quote the main building's round-headed windows.

Further work on ancillary buildings included the addition of a mezzanine level to the former hall in 1991 and the installation of a piano lift in 1996.

=== Features ===
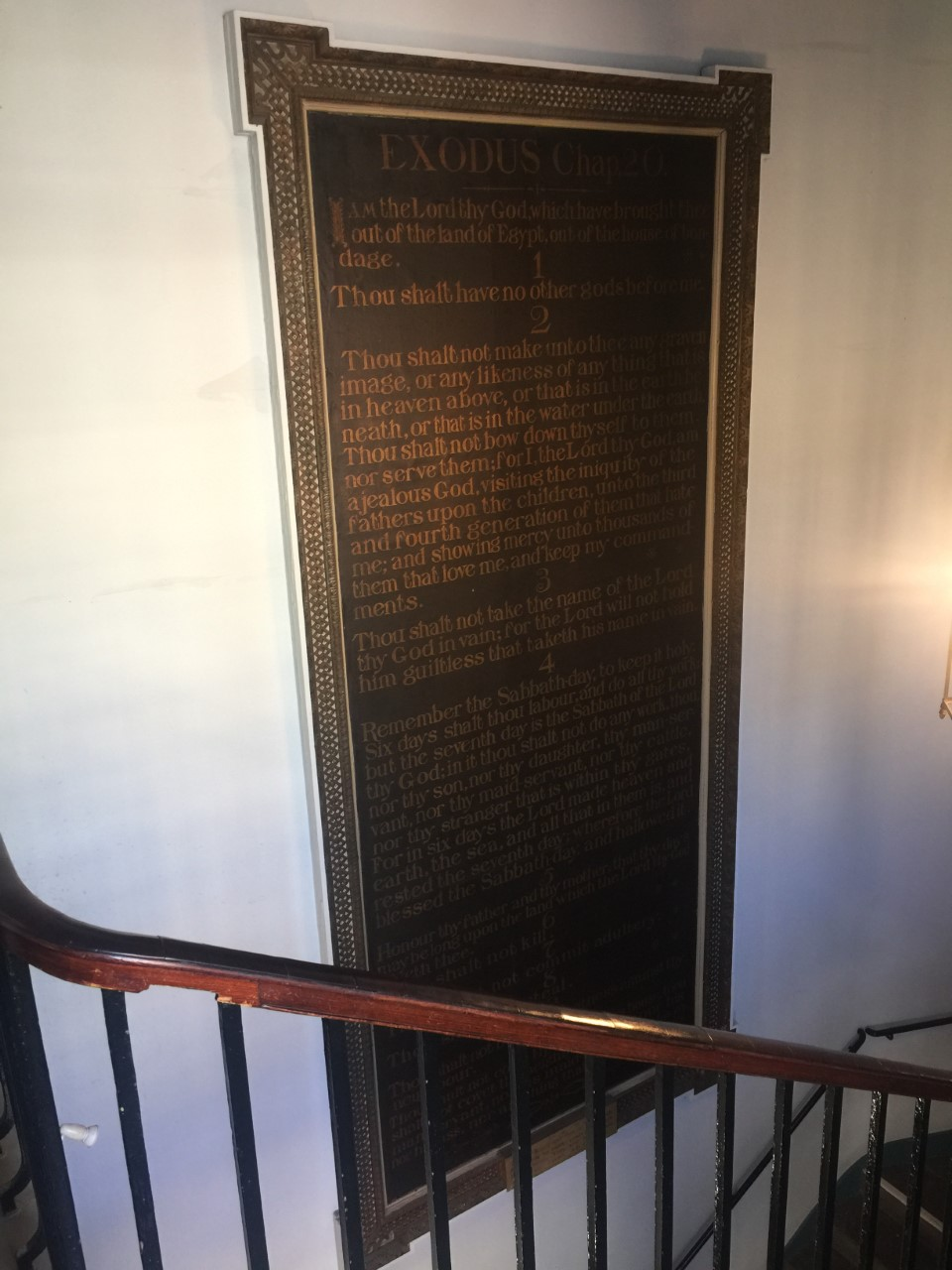
One of the 18th-century boards in the hall's vestibule, moved from Buccleuch Parish Church in 1950

In 1949, the congregation accepted two 14-foot-tall (4.3 m) boards from Buccleuch Parish Church, which display the Lord's Prayer, Creed, and Ten Commandments in gold lettering. Since 1950, these have hung one each in the north and south stair-halls. The boards date to the late 18th century and may have come from St Cuthbert's or from the Court of Session.

Prior to secularisation, the auditorium's focal point had been the original Greek Revival pulpit with domed canopy, which George Hay described as "excellent". At the time of the building's secularisation, this was removed and donated to St Giles' Church, Elgin, while a plaster tondo, created and donated by the architects, was affixed to the wall in its place.

Beneath the tondo stood a small pipe organ, created in 1809 by William Gray of London for a chapel at Costessey, Norfolk. This was moved to St Mary and St Walstan's Roman Catholic Church in Costessey in the early 20th century before being acquired by the Queen's Hall and rebuilt by Christopher Dickens in 1979. In 1992, the organ was acquired by the English Organ School in Milborne Port, Somerset.

The original clock mechanism had failed by 1883 and was replaced. This mechanism was stolen around the time of the building's conversion and replaced by an electric mechanism.
