= Kirk o' Field =

- Collegiate Church of St Mary in the Fields
- Ecclesia Sanctae Mariae in Campis
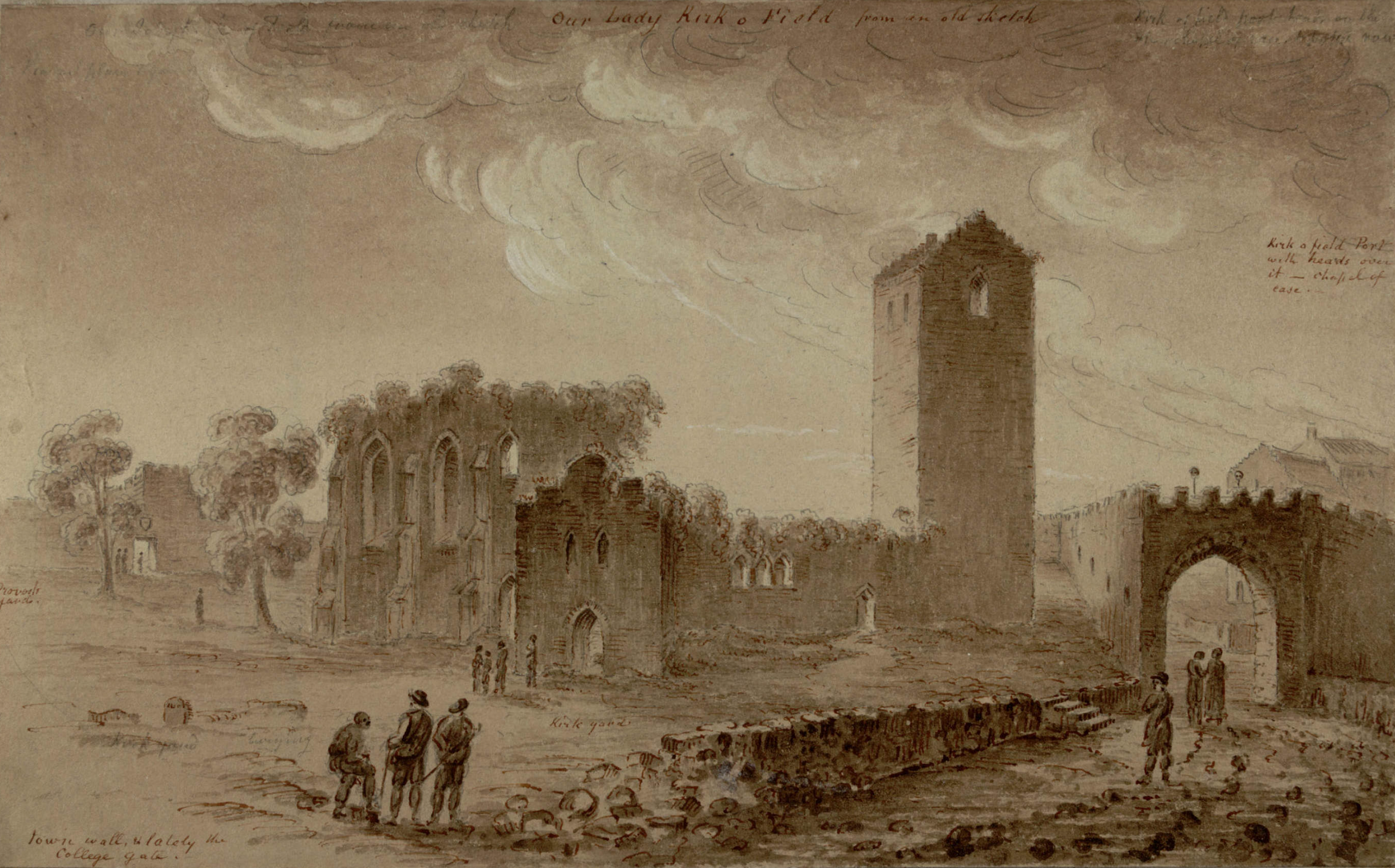
- 19th-century depiction by James Skene
- Kirk o' Field
- 55°56′50.16″N 3°11′14.72″W
- Location: Edinburgh
- Country: Scotland
- Denomination: Roman Catholic Church

History
- Founded: 13th century
- Dedication: Blessed Virgin Mary of Consolation

Architecture
- Functional status: Demolished
- Style: Gothic
- Closed: 1560
- Demolished: 1616–c. 1629

Administration
- Archdiocese: St Andrews
- Archdeaconry: Lothian
- Deanery: Linlithgow

The Collegiate Church of St Mary in the Fields (commonly known as Kirk o' Field) was a pre-Reformation collegiate church in Edinburgh, Scotland. Likely founded in the 13th century and secularised at the Reformation, the church's site is now covered by Old College.

The Augustinian monks of Holyrood Abbey held superiority over the church and likely founded it as a centre of education in the 13th century. The church appears to have been raised to collegiate status in the early 16th century. Around this time, erection of the Flodden Wall brought the church just within the bounds of the city and overlooking the Potterow Port, which was also known as the Kirk o' Field Port. After the church was secularised at the Reformation, the town council acquired its land and provostry. The area became the first site of the town's college: later, the University of Edinburgh. The church is also notable for its association with the murder of Henry Stuart, Lord Darnley, husband of Mary, Queen of Scots, which took place in the vicinity in 1567.

Contemporary illustrations show the church as possessing a saddle-roofed tower. The most detailed illustration, from 1567, also shows a tall choir and lower nave and transept. The church's ruins were removed in the early 17th century. The site is now covered by Old College. Excavations of Old College quadrangle in 2010 found remains that may be associated with the church.

In 1969 a church on the Pleasance, Edinburgh, adopted the name Kirk o' Field Parish Church, it is now the Greyfriars Charteris Centre.

== History ==
=== Early years ===
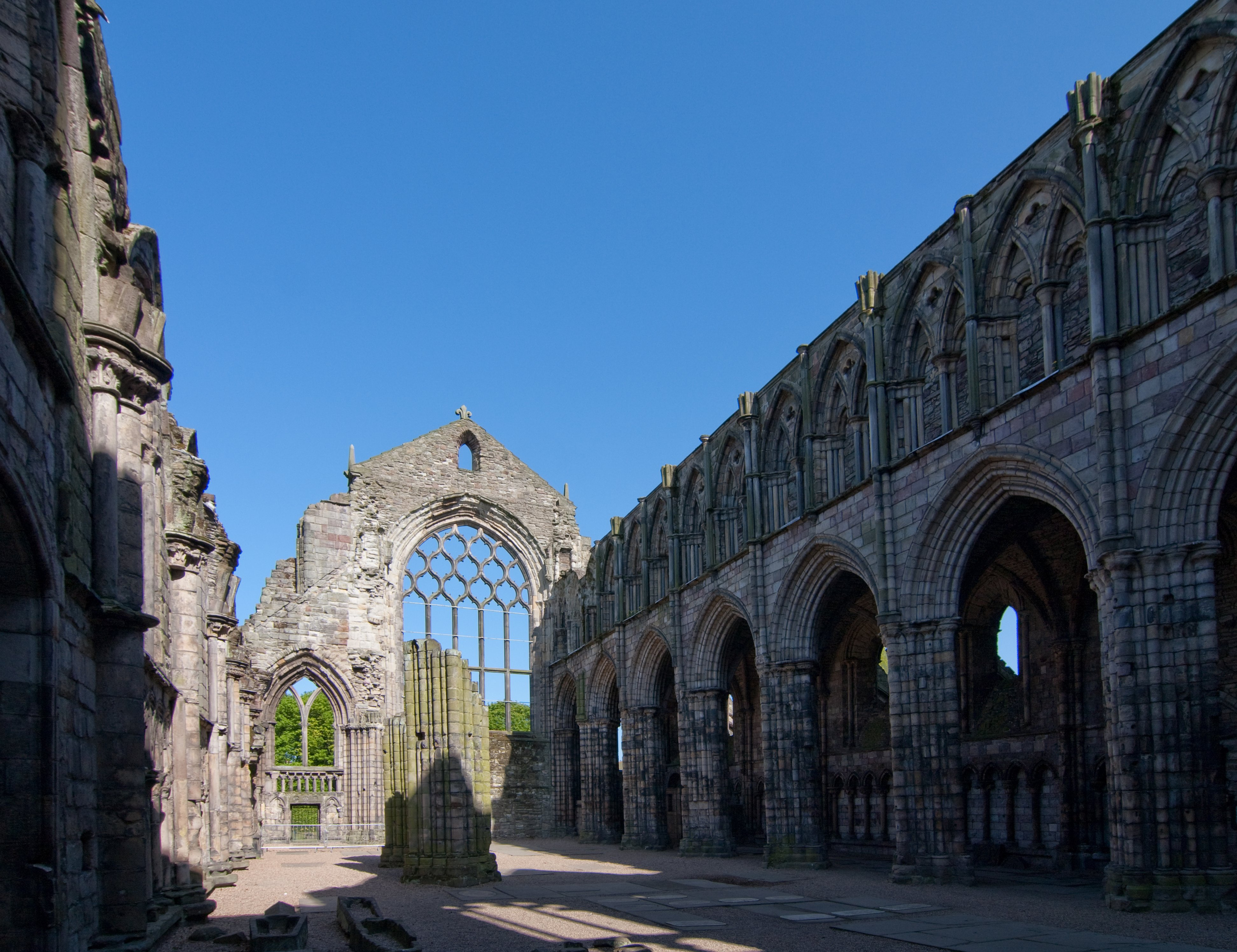
The Augustinian monks of Holyrood Abbey held superiority of Kirk o' Field and may have founded it for educational purposes

The church is first recorded in Bagimond's Roll of around 1275. It was dedicated to the Blessed Virgin Mary of Consolation and may have been established around the same time as the neighbouring church of the Blackfriars, which was founded in 1230. A document of 1428 refers to St Mary's as a chapel but it is described as a church in a document of 1489. The church belonged to the Augustinian monks of Holyrood Abbey and may have been founded by them for educational purposes.

St Mary's appears to have been raised to the status of a collegiate church early in the 16th century. References are made to the prebendaries and the master of the church in separate documents of 1511 with a further mention of the provost and prebendaries in a text of 1512. In litigation between Holyrood Abbey and the church in 1523, it is stated that the abbey had superiority of the church and had raised it to the status of a collegiate church. David Vocat, noted as a chaplain of the church in 1509 and as its provost in 1527 (albeit, the source for the latter is ambiguous), supported the erection of an altar in the church in 1518 and the creation of four prebendaries in 1528. These references may suggest he was also the founder of the collegiate church.

=== Surroundings ===
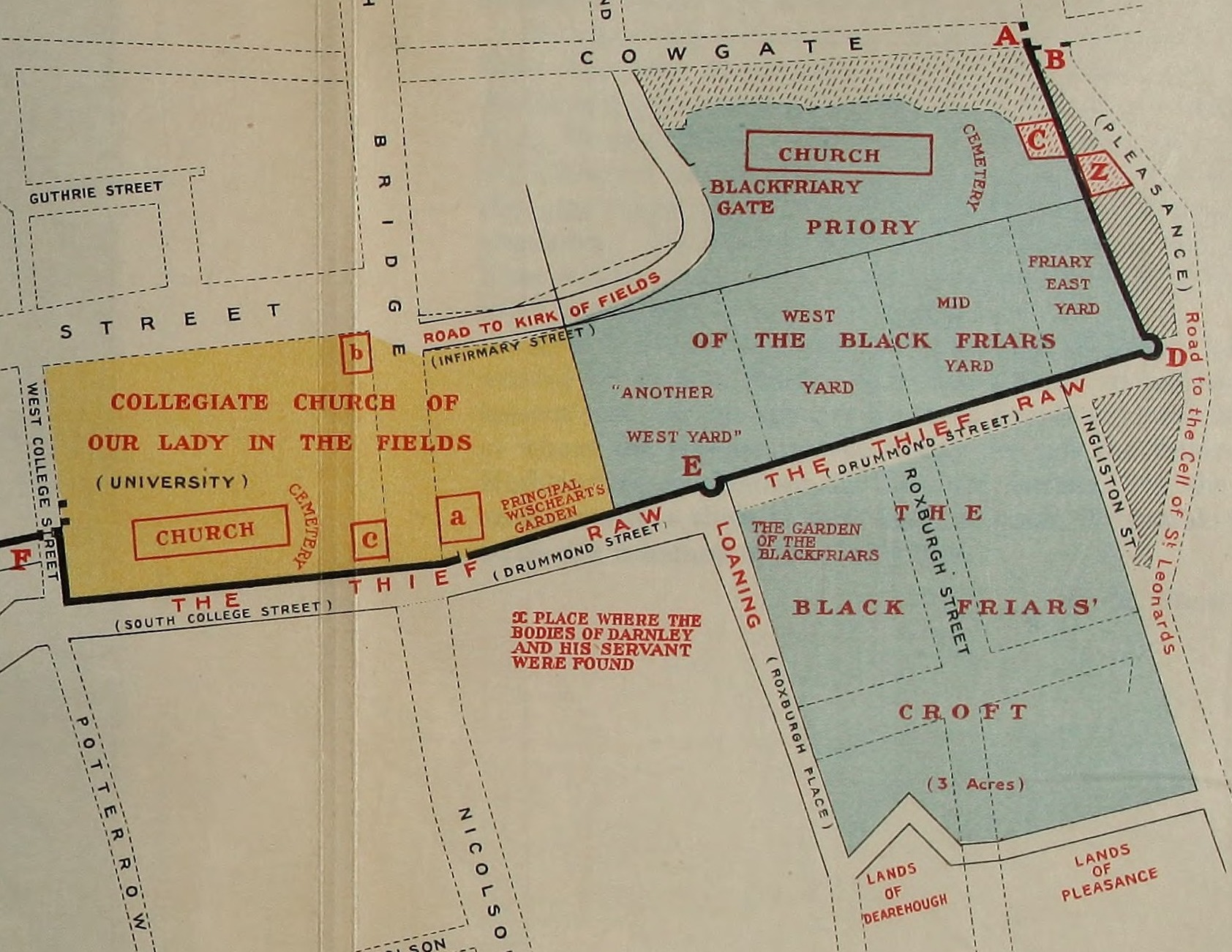
20th century plan of the historic area of Kirk o' Field and the Blackfriars with the Flodden Wall; modern streets are marked in dotted lines

The church's name is recorded in Latin as name as Ecclesia Sanctae Mariae in Campis: "the church of St Mary in the Fields. "The Fields" refers to the fact that the church was initially outside the town wall. The church possessed a successful garden that stretched down to the Cowgate, incorporating the area now represented by Old College, Infirmary Street, High School Yards. From this garden, James IV obtained the seeds to plant his "new garden" at Stirling Castle.

With the construction of the Flodden Wall between 1513 and 1515, the church was brought within the burgh's boundaries. The south wall of the church's grounds was strengthened to create the new wall. The wall at the church was rebuilt in 1567. The church's tower commanded the view over the southern entry to the town at Potterrow Port, which was also known as the Kirk o' Field Port. The church gave its name to the wynd now known as College Wynd. Initially, it was known as the Wynd of the Blessed Virgin Mary in the Field.

With the college's expansion in the 16th century, new houses were constructed around the church for the provost, precentor, and prebendaries. The prebendaries' houses and the hospital attached to them were destroyed by the English during Hertford's raid in 1544. The church also possessed a tenement dedicated to the altar of St Katherine, located in the Cowgate at the foot of what is now Blair Street. The Duke of Châtellerault purchased the remains of the hospital around 1551 and built a mansion noted for its gardens and painted windows. This later served as the University of Edinburgh's library, only being demolished in 1798.

=== Reformation and aftermath ===
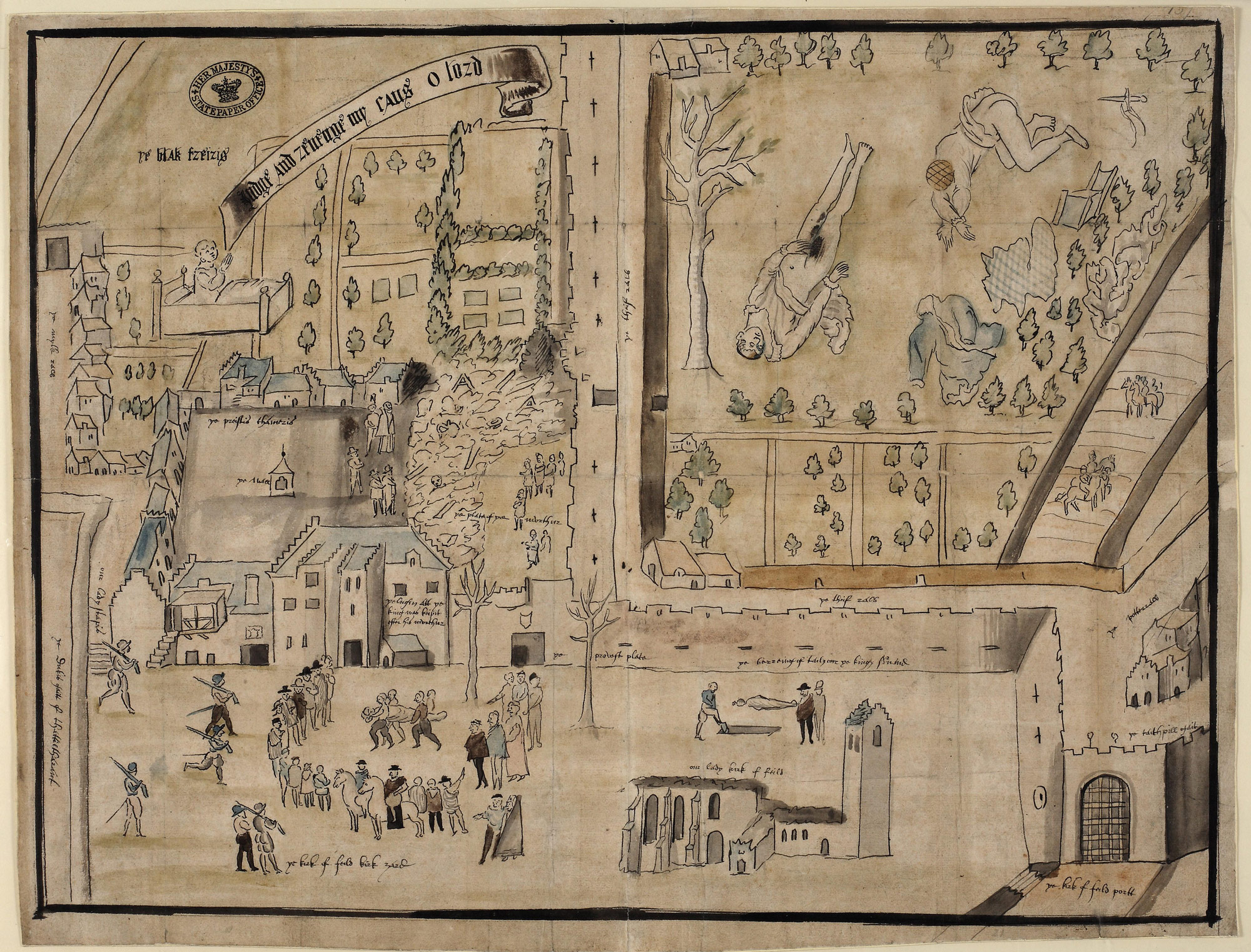
Contemporary sketch of the murder of Henry Stuart, Lord Darnley in 1567

At the time of the Reformation, the college consisted of a provost, ten prebendaries, and two choristers. At the Reformation, the church was secularised. In 1563, the town council purchased the buildings from their titular provost, William Penicuik, for £1,000. The following year, the sale remained unconcluded. To put pressure on the town council, Penicuik began to sell the stonework of the building. The sale was concluded but the plan to establish a college appears to have fallen dormant.

On 10 February, Henry Stuart, Lord Darnley, husband of Mary, Queen of Scots, was found dead in the vicinity of the church. The explosion preceding Darnley's death destroyed the provost's house and several other buildings surrounding the church. By the time of Darnley's murder, the buildings were in possession of a new titular provost, Robert Balfour, who, accused of involvement in Darnley's death, forfeited them in 1579. The provostry was granted to the town council in 1581.

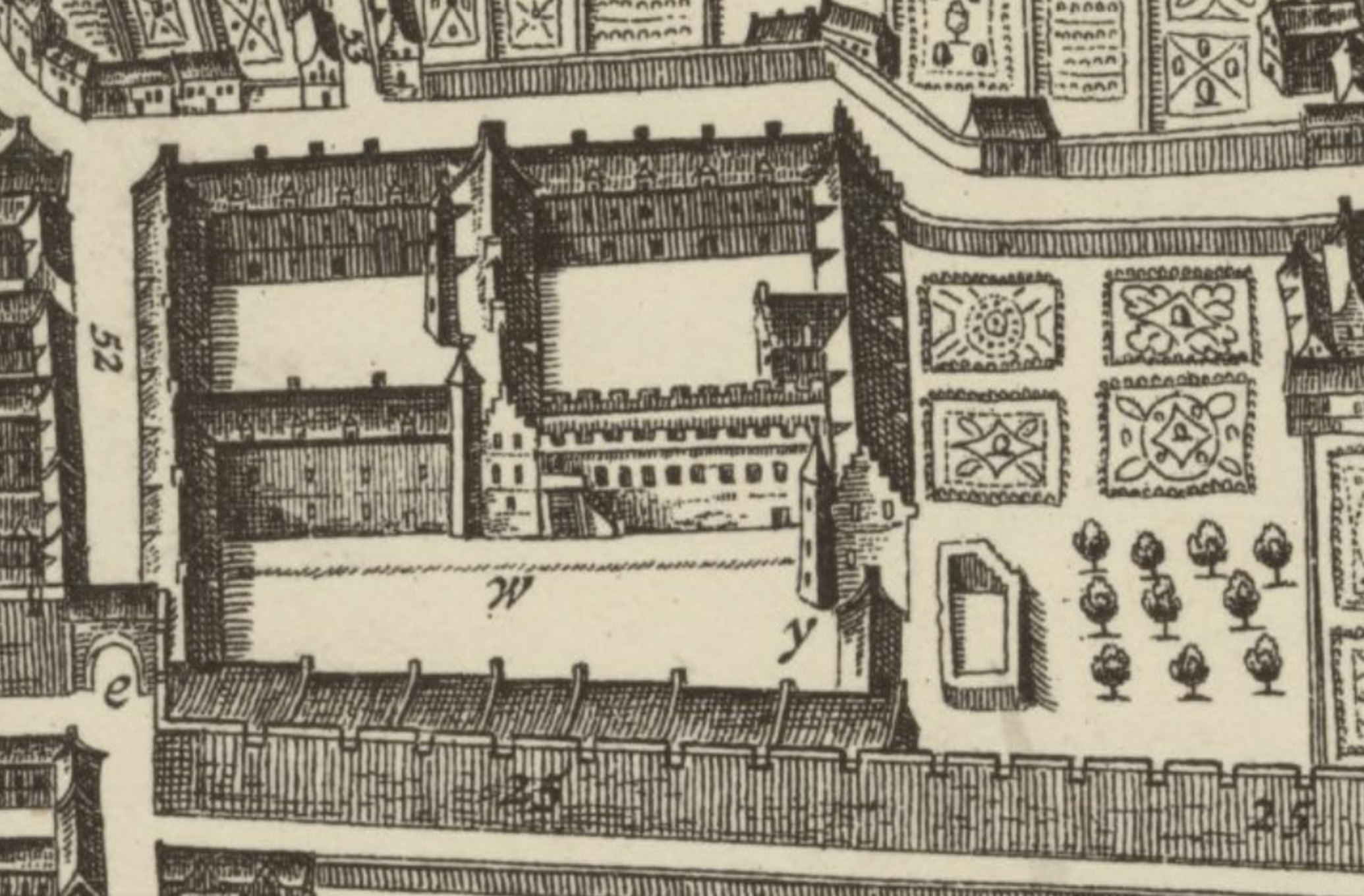
The first college of Edinburgh, built on the site of Kirk o' Field

Plans for a college were again in motion by the late 1570s. Despite the town's having considered Trinity College Kirk as the site for the new institution, Kirk o' Field was again selected as the college's site. The 1582 royal charter which permitted the town council to establish colleges named the Kirk o' Field site as the possession of the council. The college which developed into the University of Edinburgh was built on the site, opening in 1583.

The tower was taken down by Michael Hunter in 1616 and the last remnants of the church were removed around 1629, when the upper court of the college was terraced. In 1969, the name Kirk o' Field was revived for a Church of Scotland parish church on the Pleasance. The church, whose building has housed the Greyfriars Charteris Centre since 2016, had no direct historical connection to the pre-Reformation collegiate church.

== Provosts ==
The following clergy served as provost of the Collegiate Church of St Mary in the Fields, their names are given along with the dates which can be established for their provostries. Richard Bothwell and John Spittal appear in litigation in 1543 over who was rightly provost, as did William Penicuik and Alexander Forrest in 1562–1563. The controversies are the reason for their overlapping dates. The provostry was vested in the town council in 1581.

Matthew Ker: 1511, 1512–1515
Richard Bothwell: 1523–1544
David Vocat: 1527 (ambiguous source)
John Spittal: 1543–1552
William Penicuik: c1550–1563, 1566
Alexander Forrest: 1552–1561
Robert Balfour: 1566–1579
John Gibb: 1579–

== Building ==
Contemporary illustrations

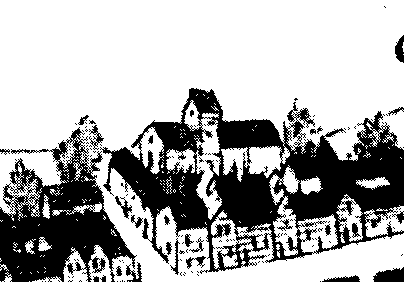
1544

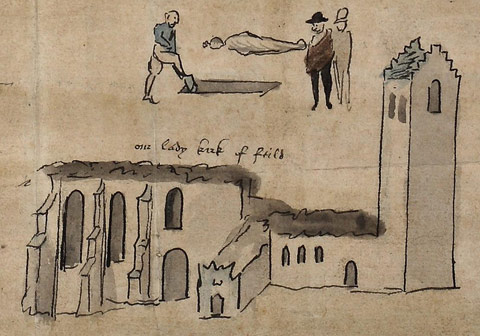
1567

Only two contemporary illustrations of Kirk o' Field exist. One, from a plan of 1544, shows it as a large cross-plan church with central, saddle-roofed tower. The illustration of 1567 also shows a tall, square-based tower with saddle-roof and crow-stepped gables. In contrast to the 1544 illustration, the 1567 illustration depicts the tower at the west end of the church. This tower would have commanded the view over the southern entry to the town at Potterrow Port. As the 1544 depiction is part of a plan, it is likely to be simplified. The 1567 sketch therefore provides the best evidence of the church's appearance.

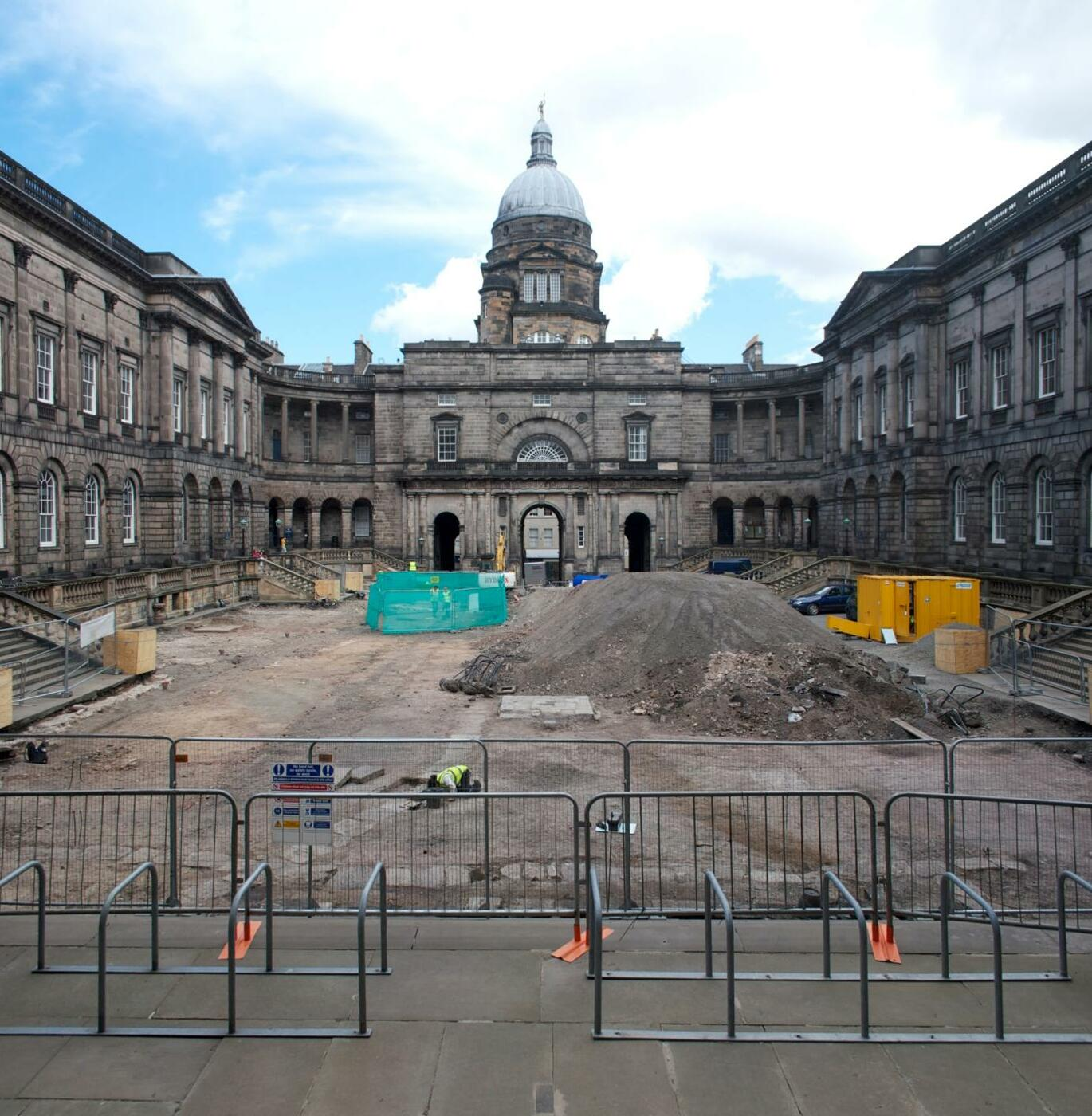
Excavations in the quadrangle of Old College in 2010, which uncovered remnants of the church complex

The 1567 illustration shows a low nave and transept with a taller choir. Henry F. Kerr argued the transept and nave dated to around 1230 while the choir was enlarged at the church's elevation to collegiate status, which Kerr dates to the 15th century. Kerr also believed the upper, crow-stepped stage of the tower was later than the original 13th-century church. The saddle-roofed tower with gables at the east and west ends appear in the 1544 illustration: this is the usual orientation of gables in Scottish medieval churches. R. H. Mahon proposed that the choir also terminated in an apse and that the lower edifice shown between the tower and the nave in the 1567 illustration was the Austin friars' college rather than the nave.

The site of the church is now covered by Old College. In 2010, archaeological excavations of the quadrangle of Old College uncovered human remains believed to have been associated with the church. The excavations found that the last remnants of the church had been removed with the lowering of the ground at the completion of Old College around 1832. Remains of what was believed to be a prebendary's house were, however, discovered at the south-east corner of the quadrangle.
