= Deaconess Hospital, Edinburgh =

Deaconess Hospital
- NHS Lothian
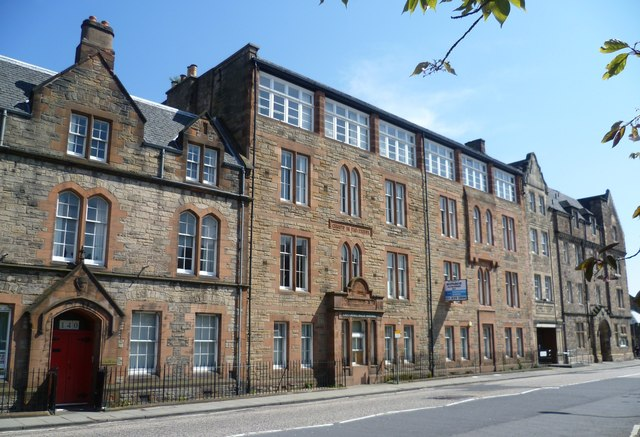
- Deaconess Hospital

- Shown in Edinburgh

Geography
- Location: Edinburgh, Scotland
- Coordinates: 55°56′43″N 3°10′53″W

Organisation
- Care system: NHS Scotland

History
- Founded: 1894
- Closed: 1990

Links
- Other links: List of hospitals in Scotland

The Deaconess Hospital was a health facility in Edinburgh, Scotland.

== History ==
The hospital, which was established as part of an initiative by Professor Archibald Charteris to provide nursing training for deaconesses, was opened in 1894. The site chosen was adjacent to St Ninian's Mission which Charteris had established three years earlier. After being substantially rebuilt in the early 1930s, the hospital was officially re-opened by the Duke and Duchess of York in December 1936.

The hospital joined the National Health Service in 1948 and closed in 1990. It served as the headquarters of NHS Lothian until the health board moved to Waverley Gate in 2010. It was converted into student accommodation for the University of Edinburgh in 2014.
