= Cold shoulder =

Phrase used to disregard someone

"Cold shoulder" is a phrase used to express dismissal or the act of disregarding someone. Its origin is attributed to Sir Walter Scott in a work published in 1816. A commonly repeated folk etymology involves giving a cold serving of meat.

The expression "cold shoulder" has been used in many literary works, and has entered into the vernacular. It has been used as a description of aloofness and disdain, a contemptuous look over one's shoulder, and even in the context of a woman attempting to decline the advances of an aggressive man. Overall, it remains widely popular as a phrase for describing the act of ignoring someone or something, or giving an unfriendly response.

== Etymology ==
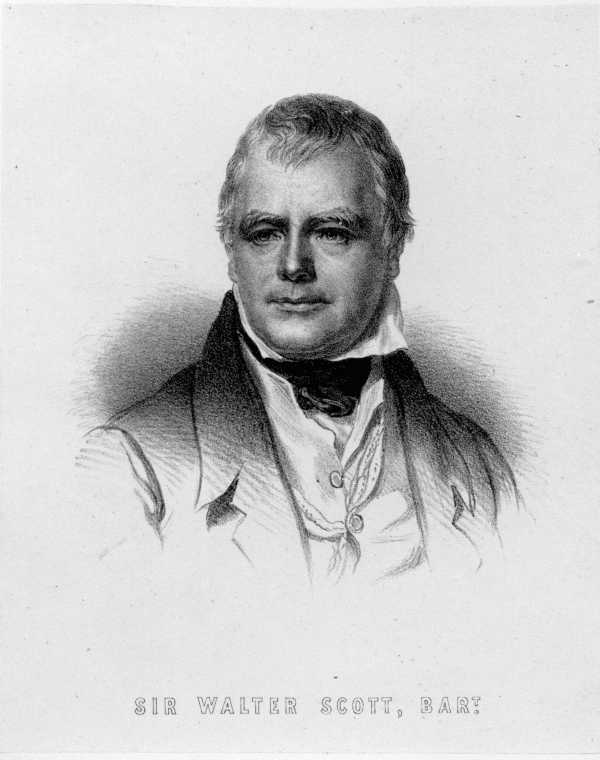
Sir Walter Scott.

The first recorded use of the expression was in 1816 by Sir Walter Scott in the Scots language, in The Antiquary.

Ye may mind that the Countess's dislike did na gang farther at first than just shewing o' the cauld shouther ...

Where "cauld" is the equivalent of cold and "shouther" means shoulder, which is further supported by contextual usage in The Antiquary. The phrase also appears in one of Scott's later works, St. Ronan's Well and after the 1820s it had travelled to the United States. Dated June 1839 in a letter to the editor in the New England newspaper The Bangor Daily Whig and Courier:

... eminent individuals and his cabinet advisers turned "the cold shoulder" to their ambassador, for his independent act upon this occasion.

The common explanation that the phrase stems from serving a cold shoulder of mutton or other meat to an unwanted guest is an incorrect folk etymology according to linguists.

One source claims that the explanation of the expression is literal: keeping one's back towards, or in the least a shoulder between, a person one was trying to avoid.

== See also ==
- Scottish English
- Silent treatment
- Blacklist (employment)

== Sources ==
- Eliot, Sonny; Hill, Draper; Williams, Stanley D. (2007). Sonny Sez!: Legends, Yarns, and Downright Truths. Wayne State University Press. p. 180. ISBN 978-0-8143-3335-8.
- Helterbran, Valeri R. (2008). Exploring Idioms: A Critical-Thinking Resource for Grades 4–8. Maupin House Publishing, Inc. p. 133. ISBN 978-1-934338-14-8.
- Hodgson, Charles (2007). Carnal Knowledge: A Navel Gazer's Dictionary of Anatomy, Etymology, and Trivia. Macmillan. p. 272. ISBN 978-0-312-37121-0.
- Jamieson, John; Johnstone, John; Longmuir, John (1867). Jamieson's Dictionary of the Scottish language. Edinburgh, W. P. Nimmo. p. 635. OCLC 70431433.
- The Nation. Vol. 69. Joseph H. Richards. 1899. ISSN 0027-8378. OCLC 1643268.
- Palmatier, Robert Allen (2000). Food: a dictionary of literal and nonliteral terms. Greenwood Publishing Group. p. 461. ISBN 0-313-31436-5.
- Scott, Sir Walter (1816), The works of Sir Walter Scott. 3, The antiquary, James Ballantyne and Co. for Archibald Constable and Co. Edinburgh; and Longman, Hurst, Rees, Orme, and Brown, London, p. 370, OCLC 310724884
