= John Longmuir =

John Longmuir may refer to:

- John Longmuir (poet) (1803–1883), Scottish minister, antiquary, poet and lexicographer
- John Longmuir (tenor), Scottish-born Australian tenor
