= Bristo Church =

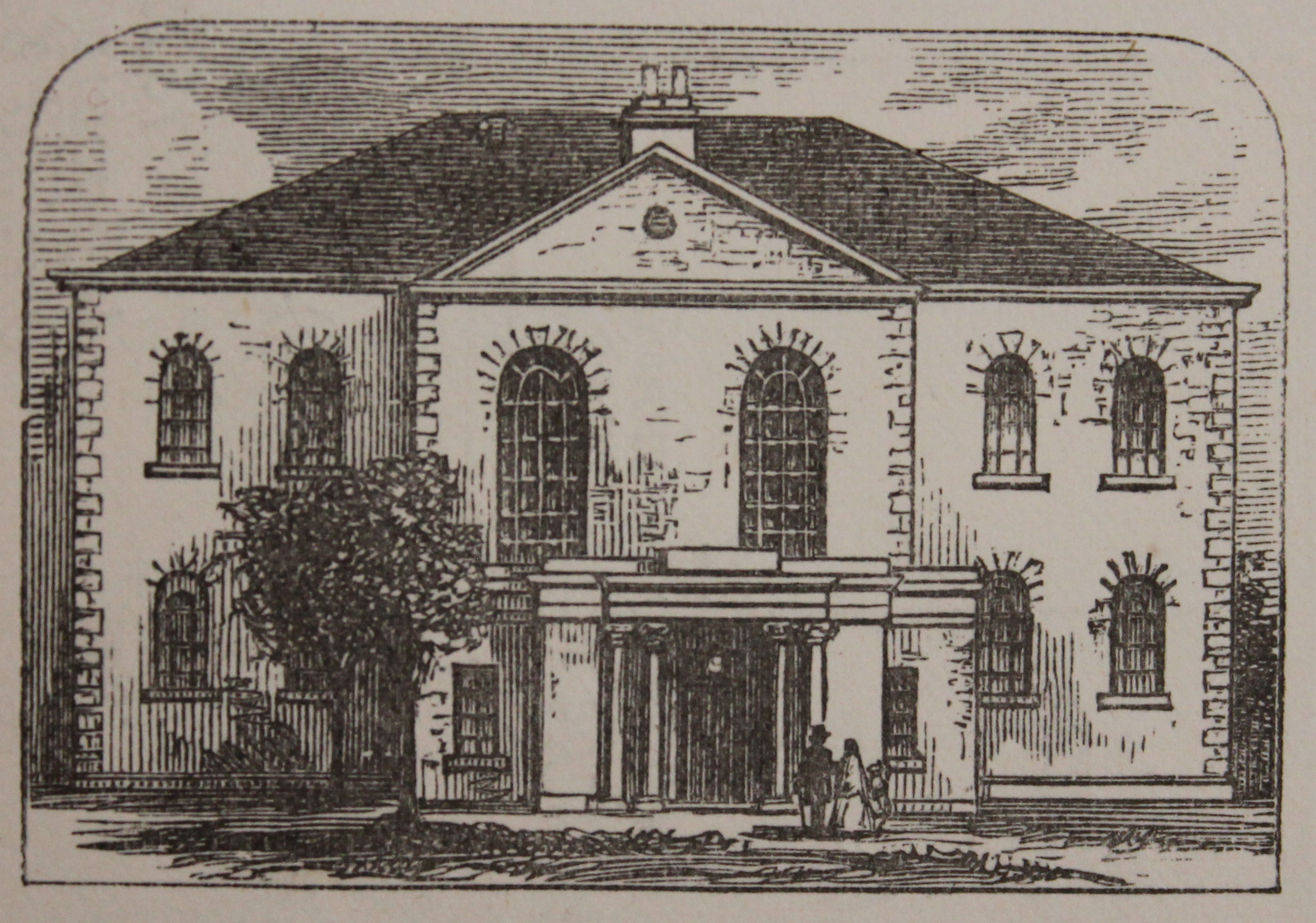
- The second meeting-house, opened 1804
- Bristo Church
- 55°56′45.49″N 3°11′16.68″W
- Location: Edinburgh
- Country: Scotland
- Denomination: Church of Scotland
- Previous denomination: United Free Church of Scotland (1900–1929); United Presbyterian Church of Scotland (1847–1900); United Secession Church (1820–1847); Burgher Secession Church (1753–1820); Secession Church (1741–1753)

History
- Status: Dissolved
- Founded: 1741

Architecture
- Functional status: Demolished
- Style: Neoclassical
- Groundbreaking: 1802
- Completed: 1804
- Closed: 1937
- Demolished: 1967

Specifications
- Capacity: 1,671

Bristo Church was a Presbyterian church located in the Bristo area of Edinburgh, Scotland. Founded in 1741 as a Secession church, it reunited with the Church of Scotland in 1929 before being dissolved in 1937. The University of Edinburgh afterwards used the building as the Pollock Memorial Hall until its demolition in 1967.

A "Praying Society" had seceded from the West Kirk in 1732 over the Crown's right to impose a minister against the congregation's wishes. The seceders joined the Associate Presbytery in 1738 and constructed their own church at Bristo in 1741 with Adam Gib as its first minister. The church played a prominent role in the history of Scotland's seceding churches. It was the site of "The Breach" between the secession's Burgher and Anti-Burgher factions in 1747. In 1820, the factions reunited at Bristo to form the United Secession Church and the first synod of the United Presbyterian Church was held here in 1847. The church was also active in domestic and foreign mission. Prominent missionaries to Africa Mary Slessor and Robert Laws worshipped at Bristo. The congregation rejoined the Church of Scotland in 1929 and was dissolved in 1937. The building was then used by the University of Edinburgh as Pollock Memorial Hall until its demolition along with much of the Bristo neighbourhood from 1967. Since 1940, the congregation's name has been maintained by Bristo Memorial Church in Craigmillar.

The church's first meeting-house was a simple, low, narrow building demolished in 1802. It was replaced by a new, neoclassical meeting-house, opened in 1804. The congregation's buildings also included Seceders' Land: a tall house which stood between the meeting-house and Bristo Street.

== History ==
=== Foundation ===
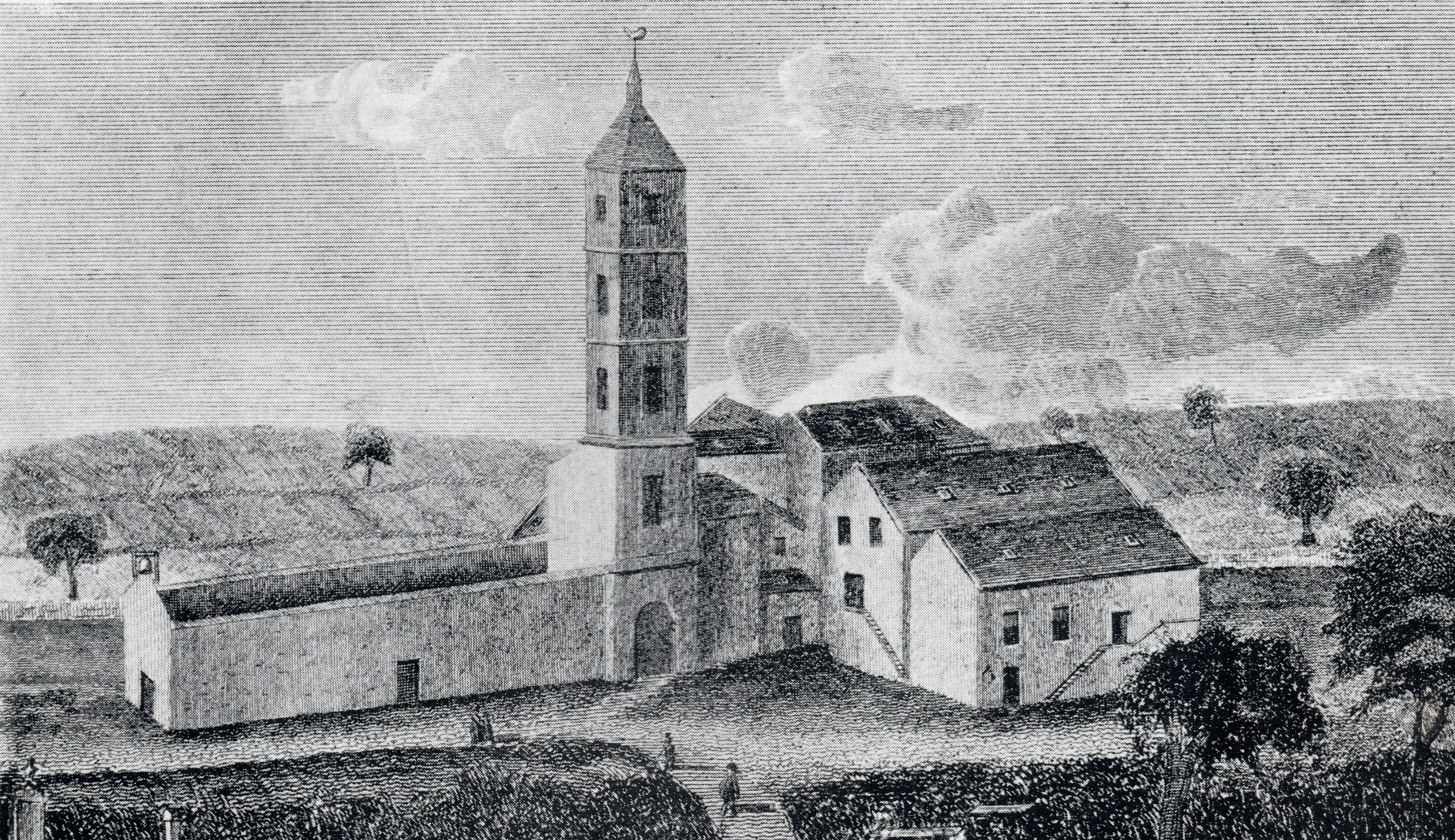
The West Kirk as it appeared around the time a "Praying Society" seceded from the church in 1732.

In 1732, the Crown used its right of patronage to install Patrick Wotherspoon (or Wedderspoon) as minister of the West Kirk against the wishes of that congregation and of its other minister Neil McVicar. The proclamation of Wotherspoon as minister sparked a tumult, which was only dispersed when the town guard fired upon the protestors, injuring several of them. Despite Wotherspoon's death before his installation could be concluded, some members responded by establishing a "Praying Society", meeting in Portsburgh. This was one of many such societies founded across Scotland around the time of the first secession.

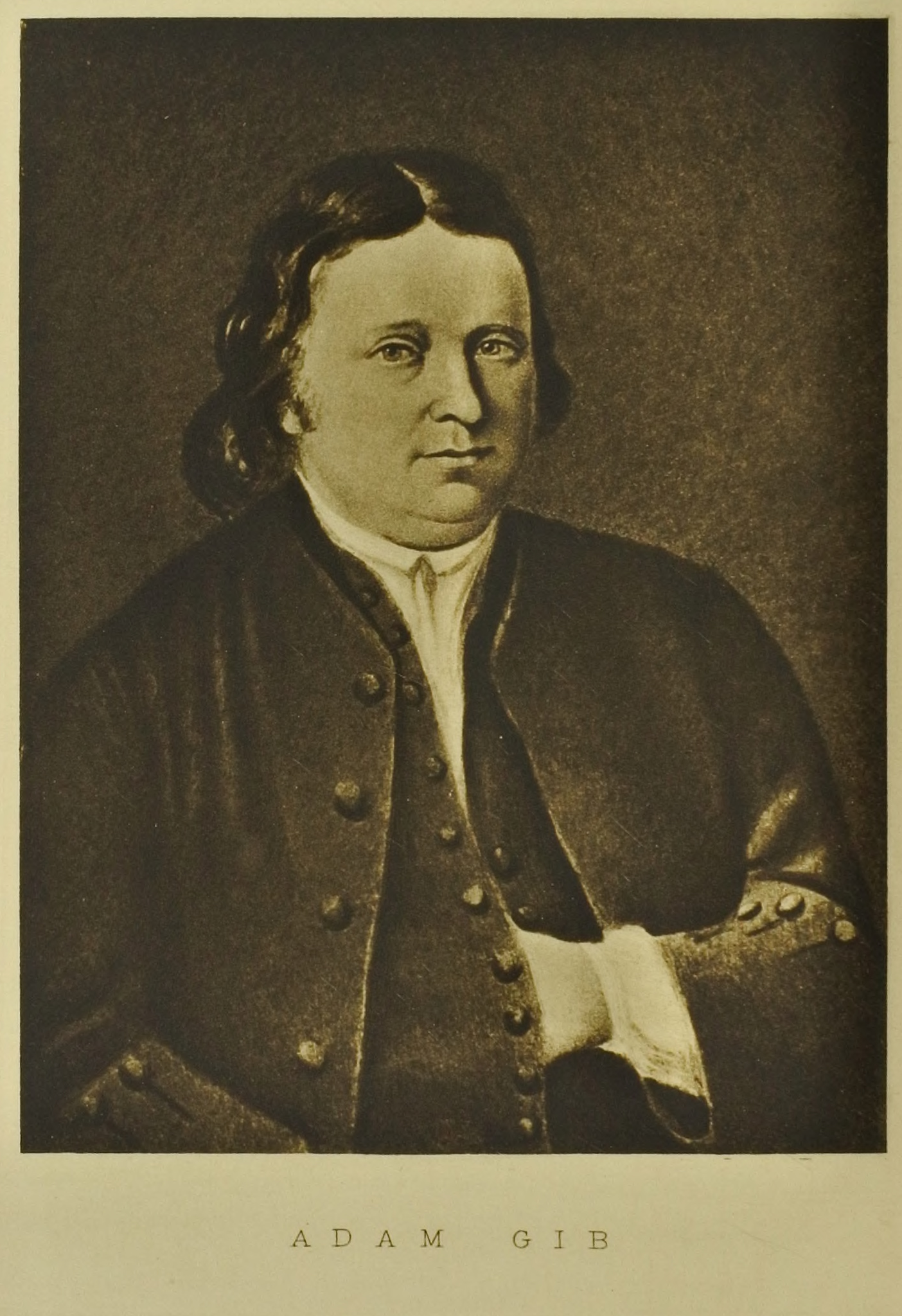
Adam Gib: the church's first minister, who, in 1753, led out an Anti-Burgher faction to form a new church

After the Secession of 1733 members of this praying society petitioned to be recognised by the newly formed Associate Presbytery. Only on 22 March 1738 did the nascent denomination meet the request. On that date, 5,000 seceders attended a convention on the Braid Hills with preachers including Ralph Erskine. On 10 October that year, the praying society was received into the Secession Church as the Associate Congregation at Edinburgh and began to meet at Gardeners' Hall in Fountainbridge. Later the same year, the congregation ordained its first two elders. In 1741, Adam Gib was ordained as the congregation's first minister.

The year of Gib's ordination, the congregation bought from Arthur Straiton an acre and a half of land at Bristo to construct a new church and manse. At the time, the area was a collection of low dwellings outside the Bristo Port at the southern edge of Edinburgh. The Secession church at Bristo was the first church of any denomination to be established in the Southside. The buildings cost over £1,400 and opened on 10 January 1742. By 1744, the congregational roll counted 1,279 people. Of these, 551 came from within the city walls and 269 came from the West Kirk parish, which, at the time, covered a large area around Edinburgh. The remainder came from areas as far as Cramond, Kirknewton, Liberton, and Ratho.

The congregation strongly opposed the Jacobites and, at the Jacobite rebellion of 1745, they raised a company of 300 to defend Edinburgh. During the Jacobite occupation of the city, Gib confronted the occupying forces, removing his congregation to the gates of the rebel camp at Dreghorn, near Colinton.

=== "The Breach" ===
The Secession Church soon faced a division over the Burgher Oath of 1690, which required public officials to "profess and allow with all my heart the true religion presently professed within this realm and authorised by the laws thereof". One faction – the Anti-Burghers – held that subscription to this oath was sinful while another – the Burghers – believed it was not. Adam Gib was a leading Anti-Burgher. At a meeting of the Synod in Bristo on 9 April 1747, members divided in a schism known as "The Breach".

For a year, the two factions worshipped together in Bristo but relations were tense: each used its own collection plate and members of each faction broke into the church to try and change the locks. During periods of expulsion from Bristo, the Burgher faction met at Carrubber's Close in the Old Town and at Bainfield House, West Fountainbridge. The issue had to be settled by the Court of Session, which, finding the congregation had not been a "body corporate" at the time it purchased its lands in Bristo, ruled that the buildings were legally the property of two Burgher trustees. The Anti-Burgher congregation was thus expelled in January 1753. They founded a new church nearby at Quarry's Close off Crosscauseway.

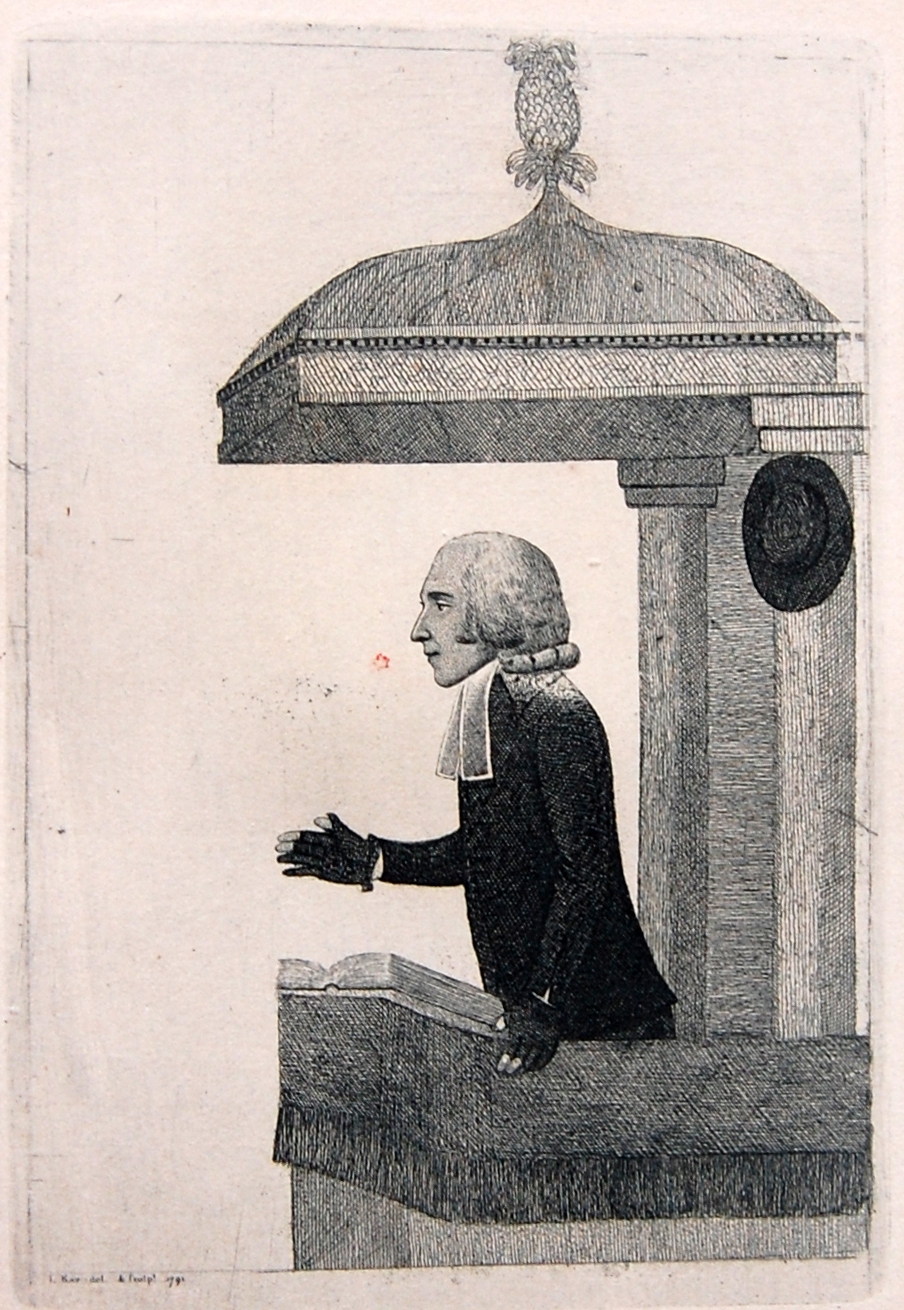
The church's third minister James Peddie, depicted by John Kay

Despite the fact that only one tenth of the congregation remained with the Burghers, these represented its wealthiest elements and counted for a third of the financial contributions to church funds. After the election of the church's third minister, James Peddie, in 1783, supporters of a rival candidate, James Hall, petitioned the Burgher Synod to be dissociated from Bristo. The following year, formed a new congregation at Tolbooth Wynd with 150 members from Bristo.

=== Reunion ===
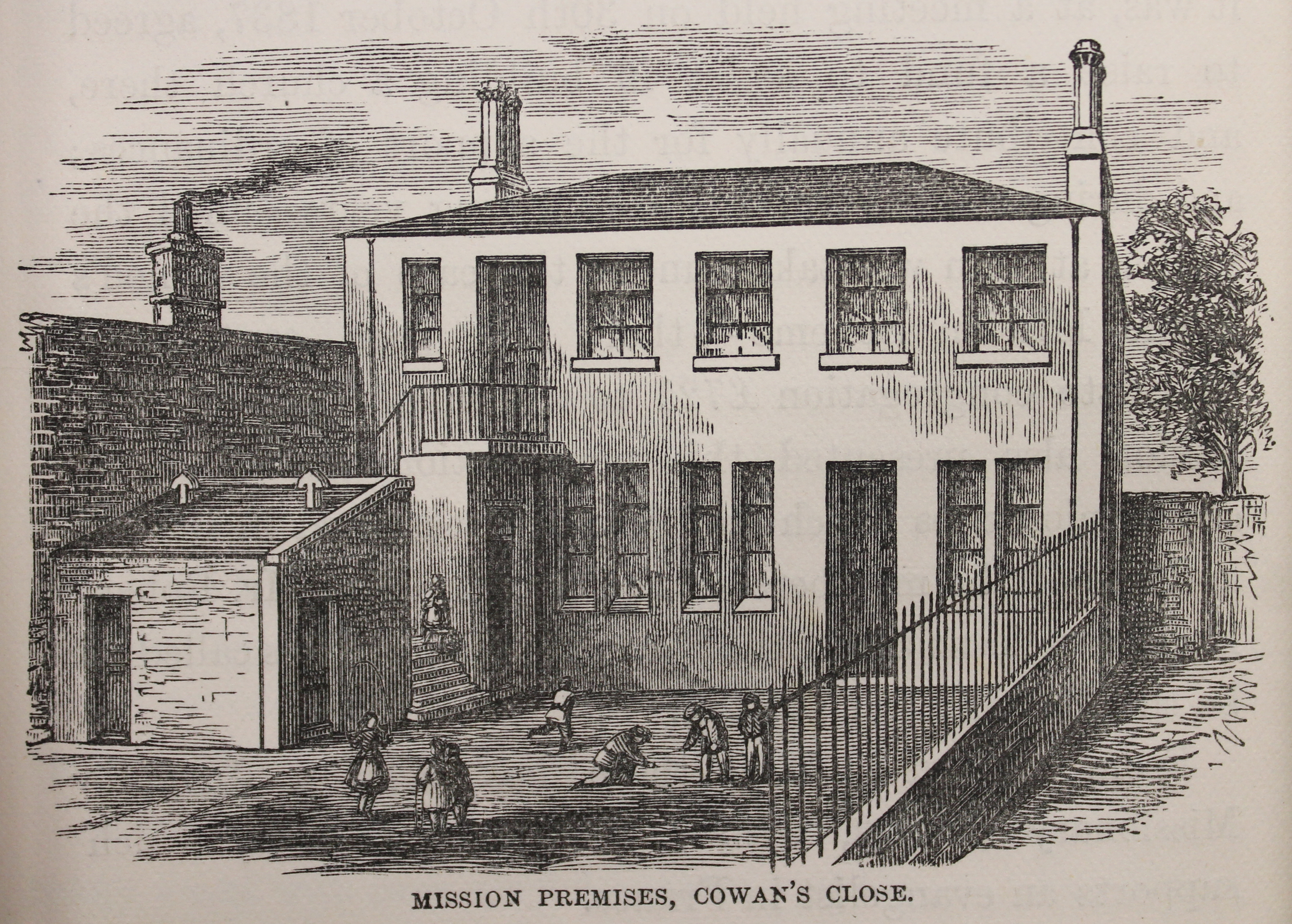
The church's mission at Cowan's Close, founded in 1837

In 1804, the original building was replaced by a new church on the same site with 1,671 sittings. The site for the new church had been expanded by the demolition of part of Seceders' Land. While a student of the University of Edinburgh and lodging in Bristo Street, Thomas Carlyle was an occasional visitor to the new church in its early years.

In 1804, the congregation formed a day school, followed by a congregational library in 1814. The school was brought into the state system with the Education (Scotland) Act 1872 and its buildings disposed of in 1876. From 1830, the congregation supported a missionary society and a juvenile missionary society from 1839. From 1837, the congregation supported a Christian instruction society to minister around Crosscauseway from a mission building at Cowan's Close.

On 8 September 1820, the church was the site of the reunion of the factions of the original secession to form the United Secession Church. By Peddie's 50th anniversary in 1832, the membership of the congregation had been diminished by the establishment of new Secession churches at Dean Street, the Cowgate, and Gardner's Crescent. The first synod of the United Presbyterian Church was held in the building in 1847 after the union of the Relief Church with the United Secession Church.

=== Last years ===
In the last quarter of the 19th century, the congregation suffered due to the declining population of the Old Town and Southside. Membership did, however, remain over 700 in 1899. A notable member in this period was the bookseller James Thin, namesake of the company he founded. Thin, who died in 1915, served as an elder of the church for 61 years and as session clerk for 58. Another notable figure in this period was Mary Slessor, who went out from the church to serve as a missionary in Calabar in 1876. The congregation supported another prominent missionary to Africa, Robert Laws, who, before his death in 1934, spent his final years as a member of the congregation.

In 1900, the congregation joined the United Free Church at the union of the United Presbyterian and Free churches. In 1929, the union of the United Free Church with the Church of Scotland saw the Bristo congregation rejoin the national church. One effect of this union was to create an extraneous number of parish churches in the Old Town and Southside. The Church of Scotland therefore decided to close Bristo. On 7 November 1937, the last service was held and the congregation was dissolved.

In 1940, the Church of Scotland's Home Board moved to raise the missionary church at Craigmillar to the status of a full charge with a new church building. The church at Craigmillar had been founded under the aegis of Liberton Kirk at the end of the 19th century and its building opened in 1904. At the request of members of the dissolved congregation, the Church of Scotland revived the Bristo name for the new charge: Bristo Memorial Church. From 1948, links between the former Bristo congregation and its namesake were maintained through an annual "Traditions Service" at Craigmillar, to which former members of the old Bristo Church were invited.

=== Pollock Memorial Hall ===
The building was purchased by John Donald Pollock, who gifted it to University of Edinburgh as a venue for public lectures, meetings, and religious services. In this capacity, it was named the Pollock Memorial Hall. The first event at the repurposed building, an exhibition of modern art, took place in autumn 1938.

Pollock advocated preserving and adapting older buildings. After purchasing the hall, he began to buy up surrounding buildings in with a view to creating student union and club facilities in them before transferring them to the university. Pollock also proposed tidying up the area around the hall to create a garden. For tax reasons, Pollock transferred the buildings directly to the university in 1943 before the plan could be completed.

As early as 1945, William Oliver opposed further renovation of the building on the grounds it was structurally unsound. When, in 1956, a university chapel designed by Basil Spence was proposed for the site, Pollock objected, arguing the Pollock Memorial Hall already served this function. The plan for a chapel was shelved the following year. Pollock's death in 1962 removed a major obstacle to the university's plans to demolish the hall and its surrounding area. Buildings between Potterrow and Bristo Square, including the hall, were demolished between 1967 and 1971. The site is now covered by the Potterrow Student Centre.

== Ministers ==
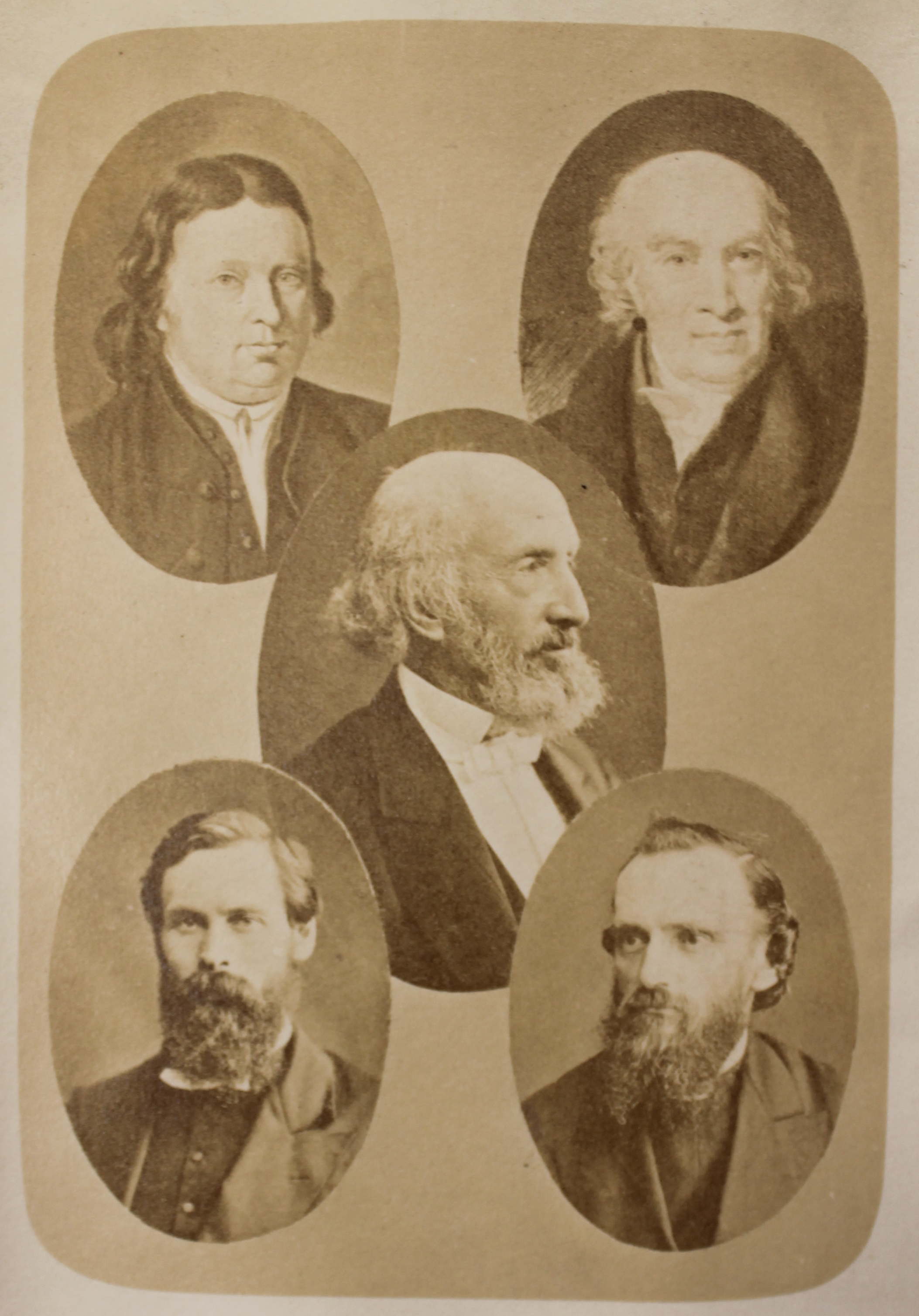
Five of the first six ministers. Top row: Adam Gib (l), James Peddie (r); middle: William Peddie; bottom row: Thomas Dunlop (l); George James (r)

The following ministers served the Associate Congregation at Edinburgh (1741–1753); Bristo Burgher Secession Church (1753–1820); Bristo United Secession Church (1820–1847); Bristo United Presbyterian Church (1847–1900); Bristo United Free Church (1900–1929); and Bristo Church of Scotland (1929–1937):

- 1741–1747 Adam Gib
- 1754–1779 John Patison
- 1783–1845 James Peddie
- 1828–1893 William Peddie
- 1871–1875 Thomas Dunlop
- 1877–1906 George Fitzpatrick James
- 1898–1901 John Alexander Hutton
- 1902–1910 Alexander Gibson Oliver
- 1911–1921 Adam Fyfe Findlay
- 1922–1928 William Pottinger
- 1928–1937 Henry Arnott

== Buildings ==
=== First meeting-house ===
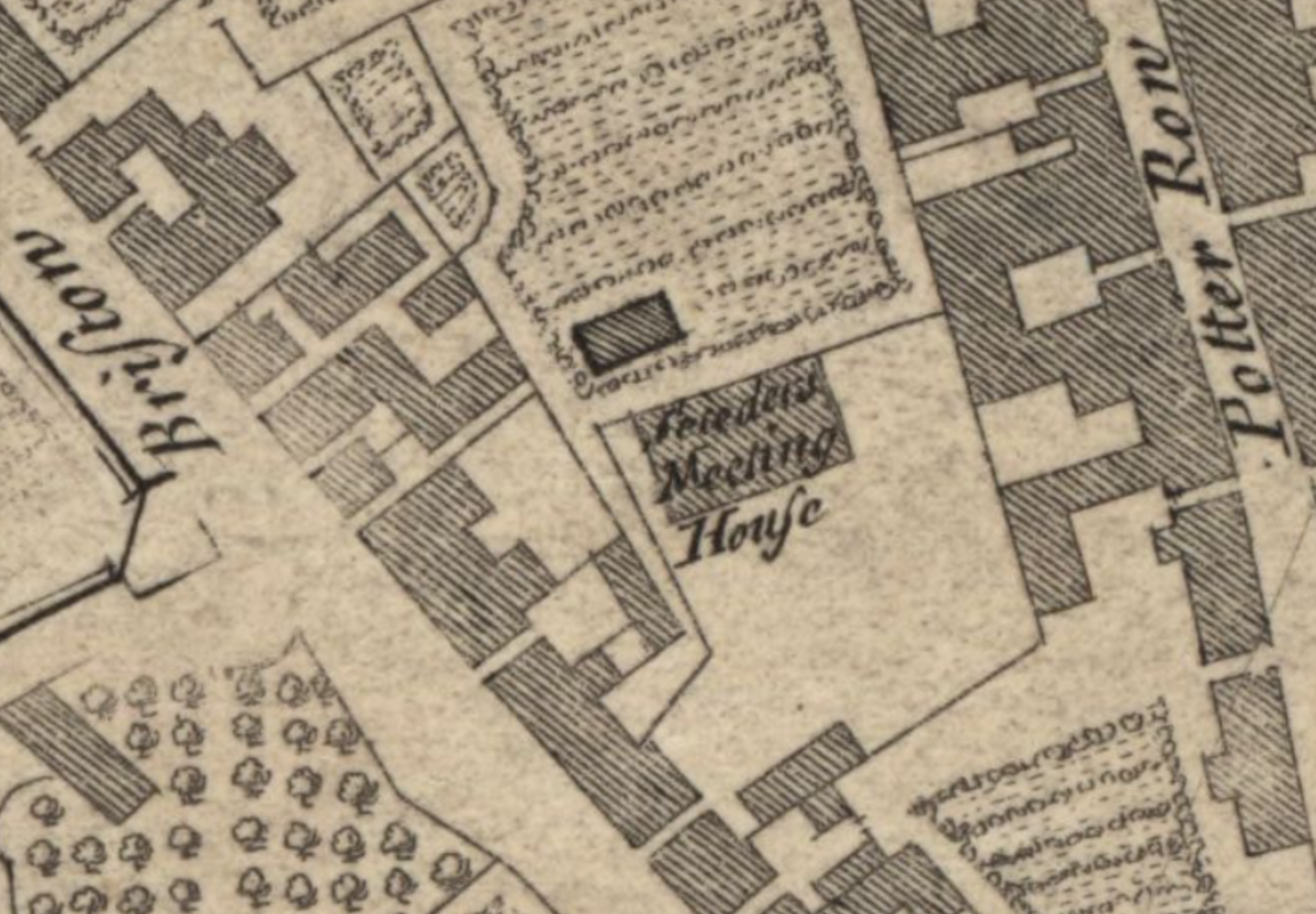
The first meeting-house shown in William Edgar's map of 1742

James Thin wrote of the first meeting-house: "It had no architectural pretensions, was too low, and too narrow for its length, with heavy galleries, abundance of table seats, and a clumsy pulpit with a heavy canopy over it, which might cause one to have some alarm for the safety of the minister".

In front of the pulpit was a tall precentor's desk with a bracket for an hour-glass to time sermons. There were windows in the wall either side of the pulpit. The church building was 90 ft (27 m) long with two rows of windows in the side walls and windows in the back wall. The front door was for the use of the minister while there were additional doors in the side walls as well as external stairs to the galleries.

The grounds of the building were accessed via three gates, one of which incorporated a sentry box in which an elder stood to take collections as the congregation entered. When the church was demolished in 1802, three or four horses' skulls were found within the canopy of the pulpit with around a further twenty found buried below it. It was believed these had been placed there for acoustic effect.

=== Seceders' Land ===
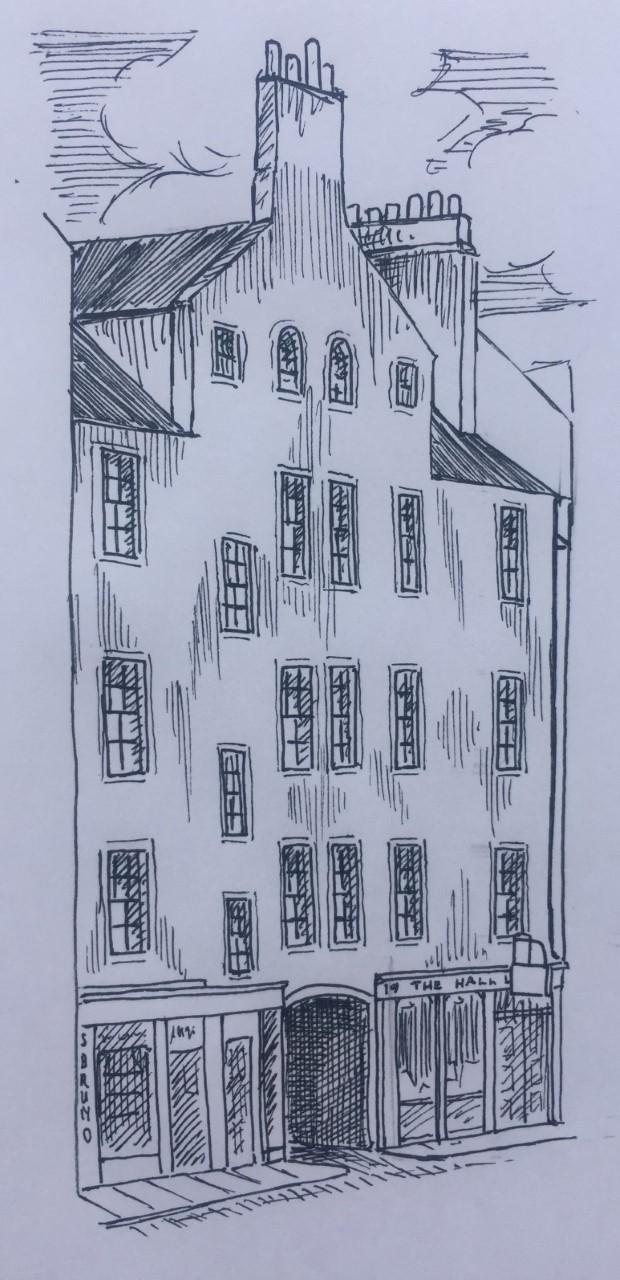
Seceders' Land as it appeared in the early 20th century.

The church was screened from Bristo Street by a house known as Seceders' Land, constructed at the same time as the first meeting-house and serving as its manse. Like the second meeting-house, this survived until the demolition of Bristo Street from 1967. It was a prominent building of four storeys with a central gablet, which had a large chimneystack at the apex. At ground level, beneath this gable was a pend, which allowed access to the meeting-house from Bristo Street.

=== Second meeting-house ===
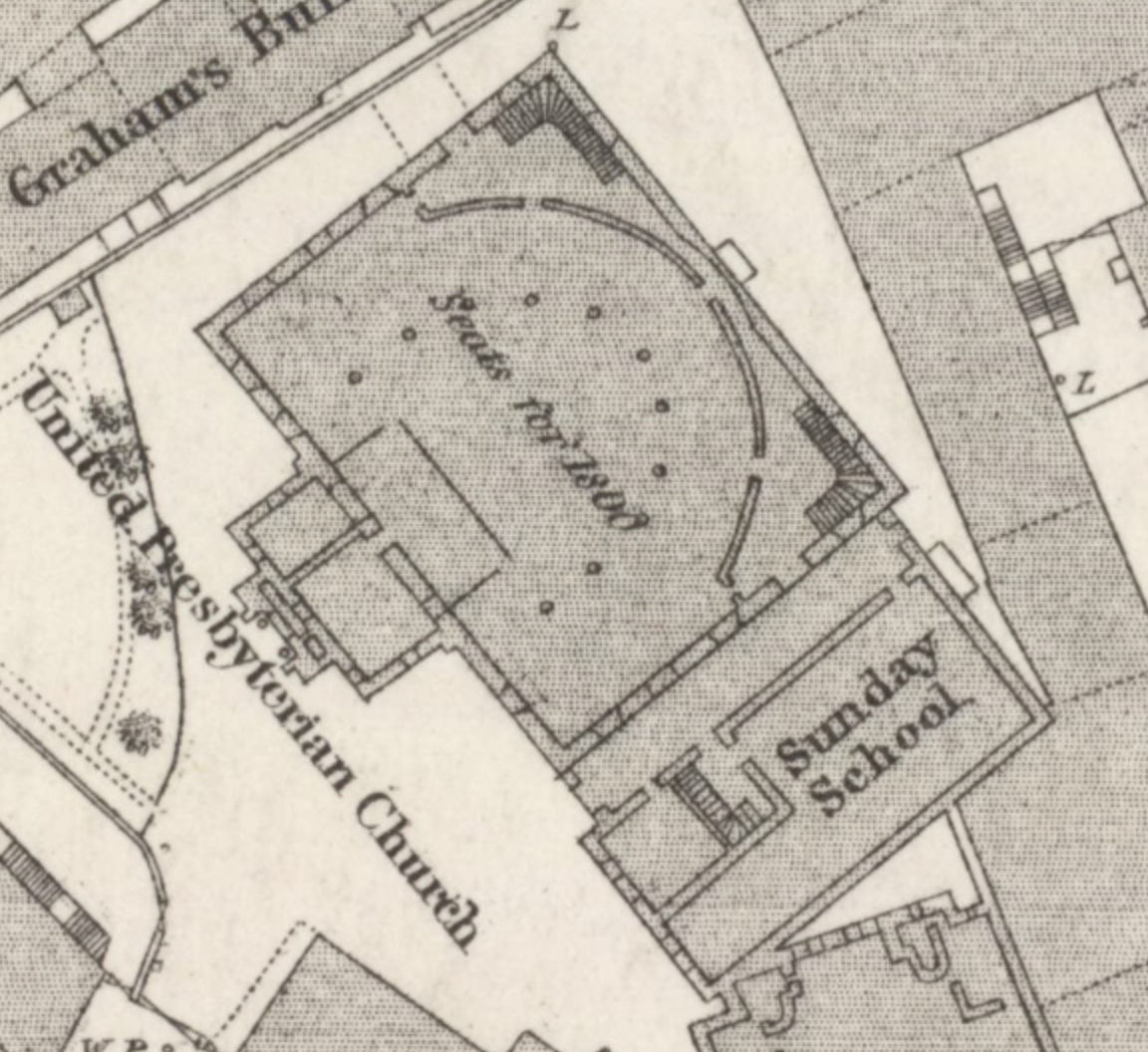
Plan of the second meeting-house, from the Ordnance Survey of 1880

By the beginning of the 19th century, the old meeting-house was becoming dilapidated and unsafe. Beginning in September 1802, work began to replace it with a new building on the same site. This opened on 8 July 1804. In 1820, a new session house and vestry were constructed at the front of the church. Soon after, a programme of repairs strengthened the church's interior. Further works were carried out in 1834, including the replacement of the pulpit and the alteration of the platform and seating. Renovation of the seating took place in 1846 and the windows were replaced in 1864. A further renovation took place in 1872. In 1905, a two-manual organ by Forster and Andrews was installed. After James Peddie's death in 1845, the congregation erected a memorial to him, designed by his grandson John Dick Peddie.

An illustration in James Thin's history of the congregation shows the church as a neoclassical building with round-headed windows and a façade centred on a pedimented gable containing an oculus and surmounted by a chimney stack. Beneath the pediment are two large windows. On the ground floor is the extension of 1820: an advanced porch including an attic storey and Ionic pillars in antis. Either side of the central bay are bays of two storeys with two windows on each storey.
