= Adam Gib =

Scottish Presbyterian minister (1714–1788)

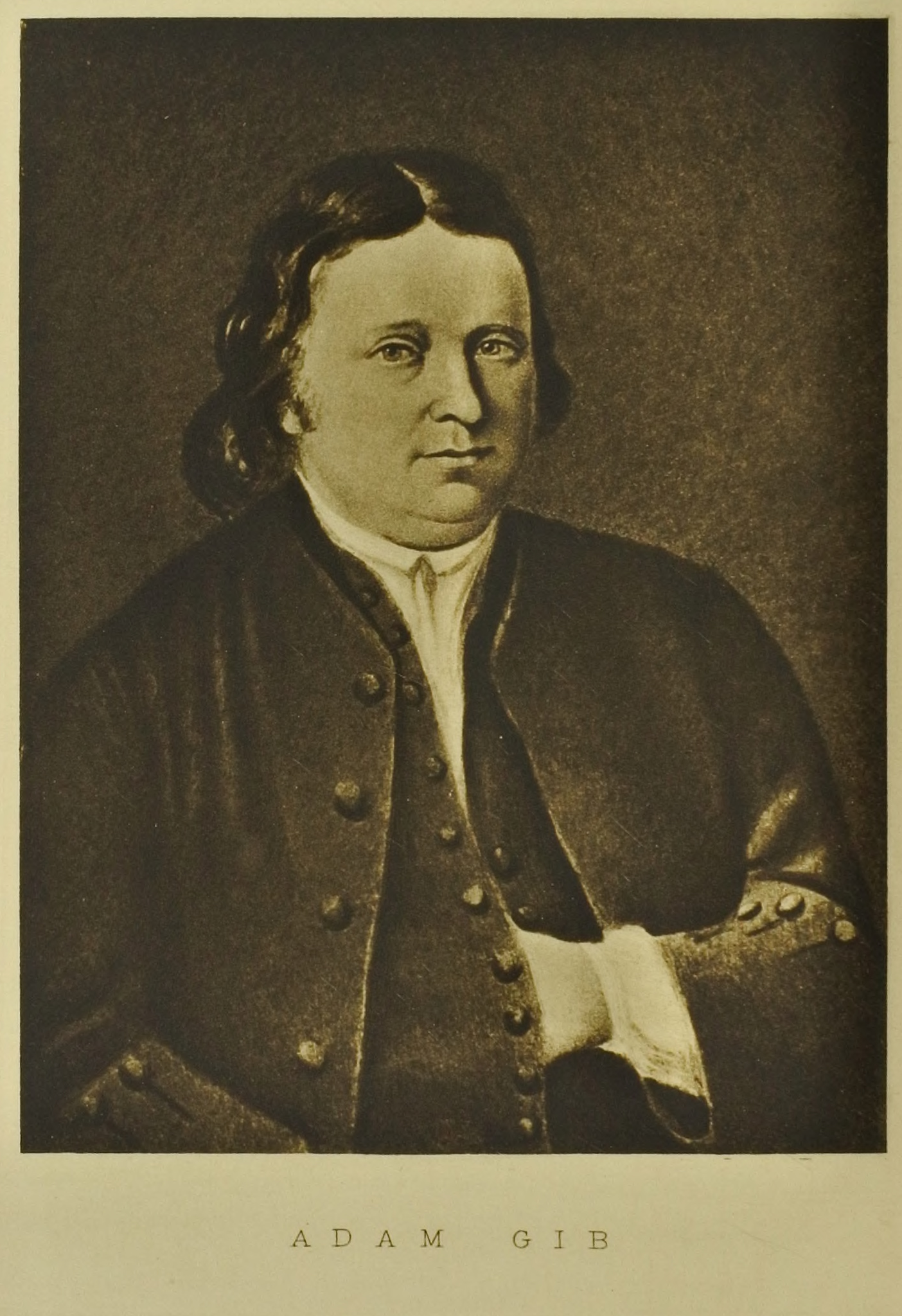

Personal details
- Born: 15 April 1714 Scotland
- Died: 14 June 1788 (aged 74)
- Denomination: (1) Secession Church (2) Anti-Burgher

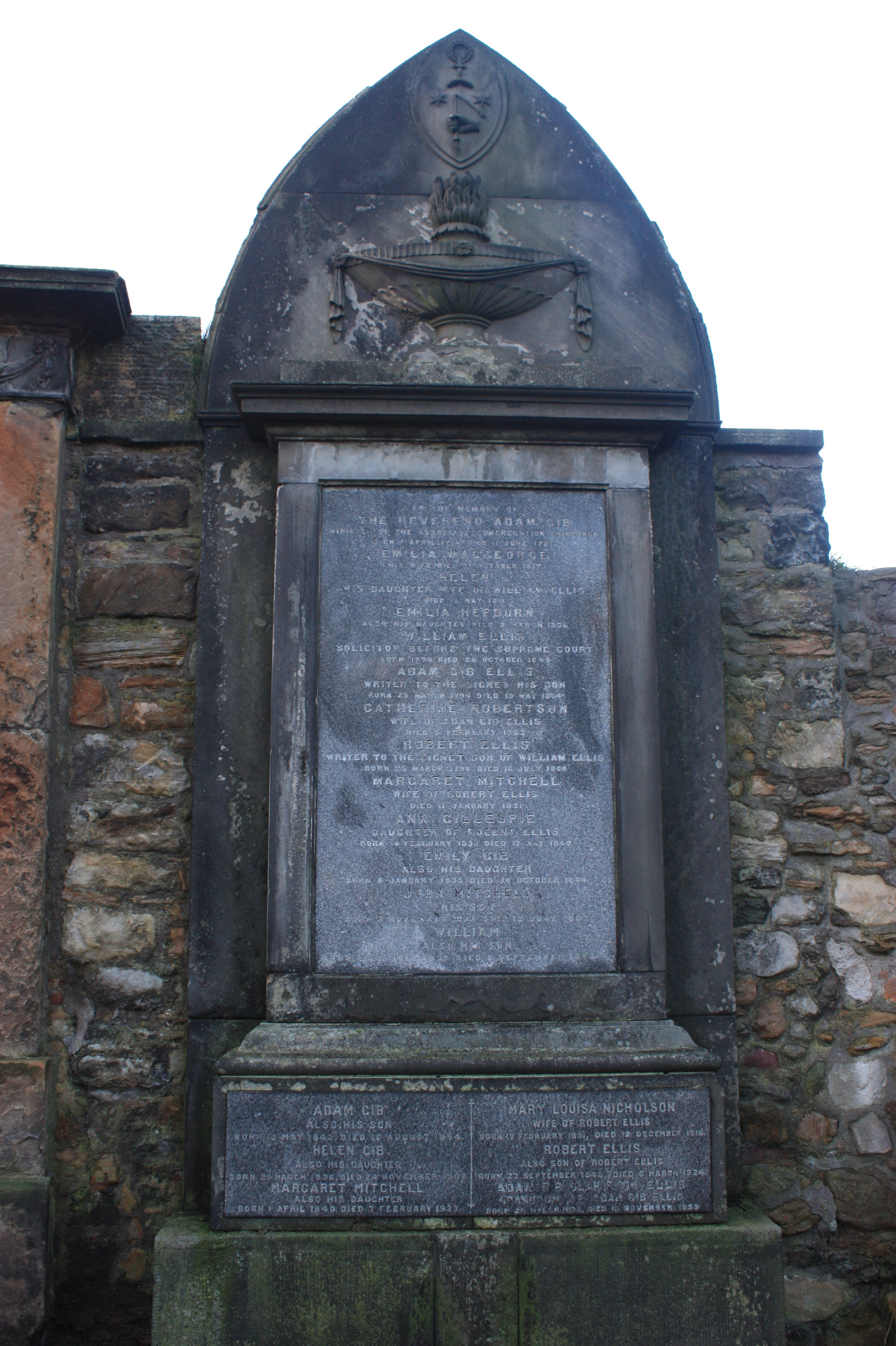
The grave of Adam Gib, Greyfriars Kirkyard

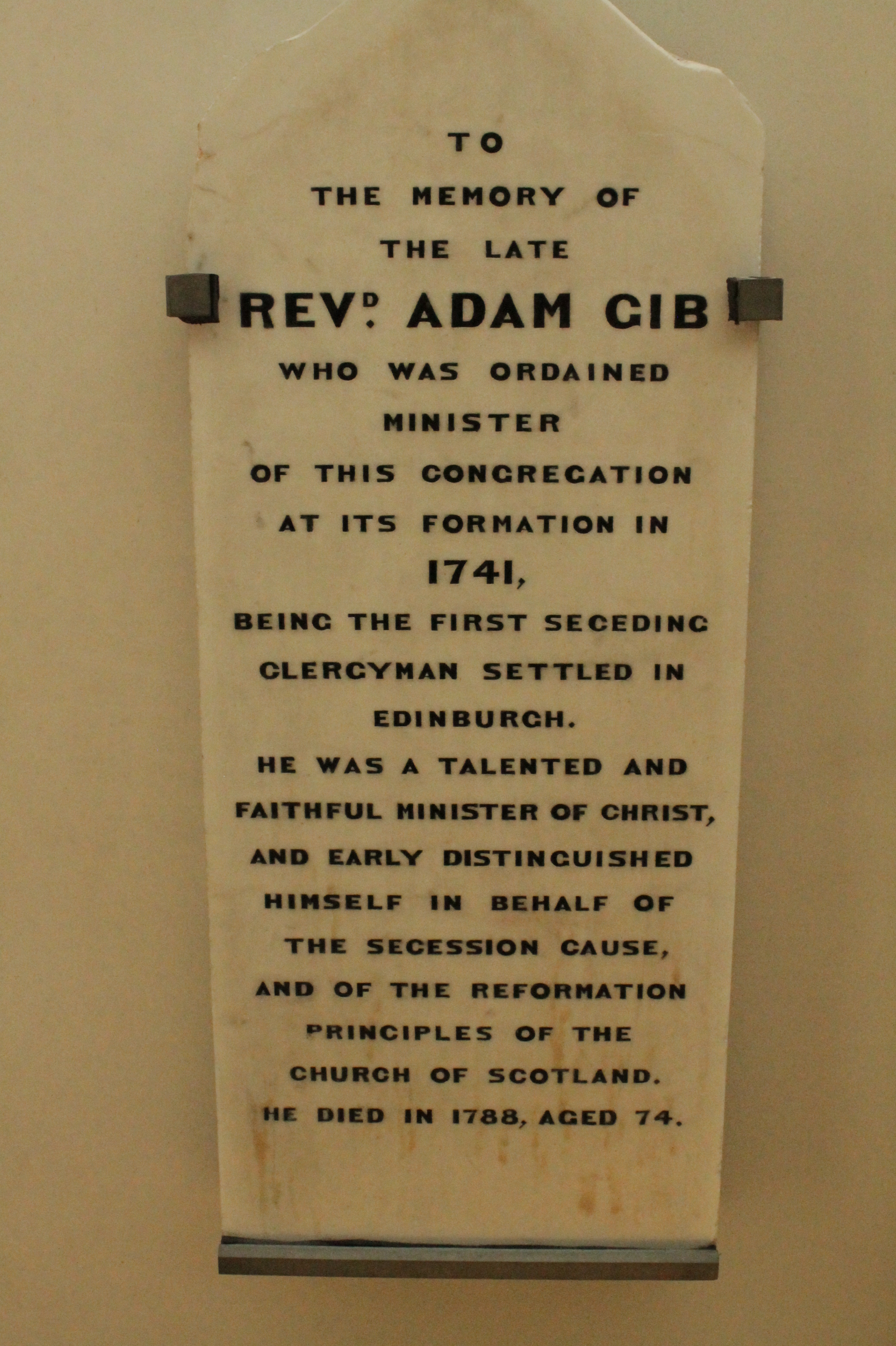
Memorial to Rev Adam Gib, from Nicolson Street Church, National Museum of Scotland

Adam Gib (15 April 1714 – 14 June 1788) was a Scottish religious leader, head of the Antiburgher section of the Scottish Secession Church. He reportedly wrote his first covenant with God in the blood of his own veins. Gib was born in the parish of Muckhart, in southern Perthshire on 15 April 1714.

He studied literature and theology at the University of Edinburgh and at Perth, and was licensed as a preacher in 1740. His eldest brother being a prodigal son, Adam succeeded to the paternal estate, but burned the will when his brother promised to reform. In 1741 he was ordained minister of the large Secession congregation of Bristo Street, Edinburgh. In 1745 he was almost the only Edinburgh minister who continued to preach against rebellion while the troops of Bonnie Prince Charlie were occupying the town. When, in 1747, the Associate Synod, by a narrow majority, decided not to give full immediate effect to a judgment which had been passed in the previous year against the lawfulness of the Burgess Oath, Gib led the protesting minority, who broke off and formed the Antiburgher Synod (10 April) in his own house in Edinburgh.

It was chiefly through Gib's influence that the Antiburghers decided, at subsequent meetings, to summon to the bar their Burgher brethren, and to depose and excommunicate them for contumacy. Gib's action in forming the Antiburgher Synod led, after prolonged litigation, to his exclusion from the building in Bristo Street where his congregation had met. In 1765 he made his response to the General Assembly of the Church of Scotland, which had stigmatized the Secession as threatening the peace of the country. From 1753 till within a short period of his death, he preached regularly in Nicolson Street Church, which was constantly filled with an audience of two thousand persons. His dogmatic and fearless attitude in controversy earned for him the nickname Pope Gib.

He died on 14 June 1788 and was buried in Greyfriars Kirkyard in Edinburgh on 18 June. The grave lies on the south-facing section of the western wall within the original graveyard. He is buried with his wife Emilia MacGeorge and his daughters.

== Life ==
Adam Gib was a Scottish Antiburgher divine, the ninth son of John Gib. He was born at Cowden Castle, his father's property, in the parish of Muckhart, Perthshire, on 7 April 1714. His mother's name was Helen Bogie.

Adam was educated at the University of Edinburgh. His first serious impressions were caused by his unexpectedly witnessing the execution of a criminal in the Grassmarket. While he was attending the undergraduate classes the controversy was going on in the general assembly which led to the formation of the secession church under Ebenezer Erskine and others, and Gib was so impressed with the harsh treatment of the seceders, that he threw in his lot with them. His father was at first extremely displeased with him, but was afterwards reconciled; and as his eldest son was a prodigal he settled on Adam the succession to the estate. When the will was read Adam asked his brother if he would reform, and on his promising to do so put the will into the fire. Gib joined the ‘Associate Presbytery’ founded by Erskine and others in 1735, and was licensed to the West Kirk of Stirling on 5 March 1740. In 1741 he was ordained to the charge of the Secession congregation in Bristo Street, Edinburgh. In 1745, when Edinburgh fell into the hands of the Pretender, Gib displayed courage. Most of the presbyterian ministers had fled from the city. Gib, however, withdrew with his flock only to the suburbs, and for five Sundays at Dreghorn, near Colinton, three miles from Edinburgh, where the insurgents had a guard, he spoke voice against the "popish pretender" and his cause. He prayed for George II, for the preservation of the Protestant succession, and for the suppression of the rebellion. The services were conducted in the open air, and among the audience were sometimes some of the Pretender's soldiers. Gib took prisoner a rebel spy a few hours before the Battle of Falkirk; but when searched for he could not be found.

About 1747, among the Seceders a dispute arose about the lawfulness of an oath to be taken by burgesses or burghers. Gib took the side of those who deemed the oath unlawful, and ultimately became the leader of the Antiburgher section of the Secession Church. The antiburgher synod was constituted in his house at Edinburgh 10 April 1747. This involved him and his flock in litigation over Bristo Church. Gib stuck to the building for years, after decisions had been given against him. His congregation built a meeting-place for him in Nicolson Street, where he ministered till near his death, which took place at Edinburgh on 18 June 1788. He was succeeded as minister by John Jamieson.

All his life Gib was an active controversialist. Rude, scornful, and despotic, he earned for himself the nickname "Pope Gib".

== Publications ==
- 1. ‘A Warning against Countenancing the Ministrations of George Whitefield,’ Edinburgh, 1742. This he afterwards regretted that he had written.
- 2. ‘The Proceedings of the Associate Synod at Edinburgh, concerning some Ministers who have Separated from them,’ Edinburgh, 1748.
- 3. ‘A Solemn Warning by the Associate Synod,’ Edinburgh, 1758.
- 4. ‘Address to the Associate Synod met at Edinburgh,’ Edinburgh, 1763.
- 5. ‘An Exposure of a False and Abusive Libel entitled “The Procedure of the Associate Synod in Mr. Pirie's Case Represented,”’ Edinburgh, 1764.
- 6. ‘A Refuge of Lies scooped away, in Answer to a most False and Abusive Libel,’ Edinburgh, 1768.
- 7. ‘Tables for the Four Evangelists’ [anon., 1770]; 2nd edit., with author's name, 1800.
- 8. ‘The Present Truth, a Display of the Secession Testimony,’ 2 vols., Edinburgh, 1774.
- 9. ‘An Antidote against a New Heresy concerning the True Sonship of Jesus Christ,’ a sermon against William Dalgliesh of Peebles [q. v.], Edinburgh, 1777.
- 10. ‘Vindiciæ Dominicæ, a Defence of the Reformation-standards of the Church of Scotland concerning the Administration of the Lord's Supper and the One Sonship of Jesus Christ’ [anon.], Edinburgh, 1780.
- 11. ‘A Display of the Fraudulent and Gross Abuses committed upon the Secession-testimony’ [anon.], Edinburgh, 1780.
- 12. ‘Kαινἀ καὶ Παlαιά: Sacred Contemplation in three parts: I. A View of the Covenant of Works; II. A View of the Covenant of Grace; III. A View of the Absolute and Immediate Dependence of all things on God,’ Edinburgh, 1786.
- Tables for the Four Evangelists (1770, and with author's name, 1800)
- Concerning the Gospel Call And The Warrant Of Faith
- The Present Truth, a Display of the Secession Testimony (2 vols., 1774)
- Vindiciae dominicae (Edin., 1780).
- A display of the fraudulent and gross abuses committed upon the Secession-testimony, in a late publication, entitled The re-exhibition of the testimony : containing some strictures upon persecution and toleration

== Bibliography ==
- M'Kerrow's Hist. Secession Church
- M'Kelvie's Annals and Statistics of the United Presbyterian Church
- Chambers's Eminent Scotsmen
- Anderson's Scottish Nation
- Scots Mag. vol. xxvii.
- Walker's Theology and Theologians of Scotland.

== Memorials ==
A memorial plaque taken from the Nicolson Street Church is now on display in the National Museum of Scotland.

== External sources ==
- Works by or about Adam Gib at the Internet Archive
