= Southside Community Centre =

Former church in Edinburgh, Scotland

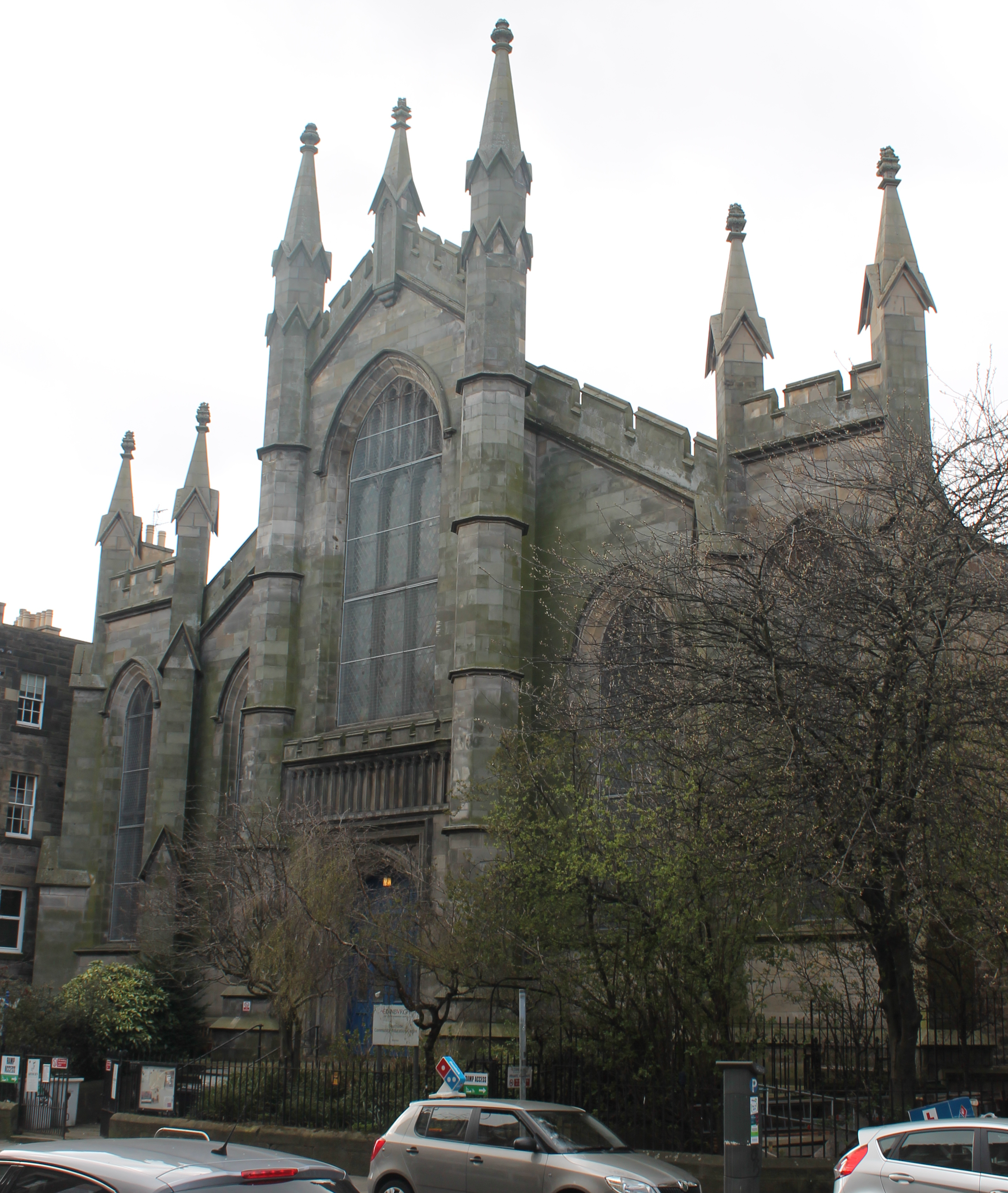
- Interactive map of the Southside Community Centre area
- Former names: Nicolson Street Church of Scotland (1929–1969); Nicolson Street United Free Church (1900–1929); Nicolson Street United Presbyterian Church (1847–1900); Nicolson Street United Secession Church (1820–1847); Dr Jamieson's Meeting-House
- Alternative names: Southside Community Education Centre; Zoo Southside

General information
- Status: Active
- Architectural style: Perpendicular Gothic; Gothic Revival
- Location: 117 Nicolson Street; Edinburgh; EH8 9ER, Edinburgh, Scotland
- Coordinates: 55°56′39.5″N 3°11′2.47″W
- Completed: 1820
- Renovated: 1932–1934; 1986
- Cost: £6,000
- Operator: City of Edinburgh Council

Height
- Height: 27.4 m (90 ft)

Design and construction
- Architect: James Gillespie Graham

Renovating team
- Architect: John Ross McKay
- Renovating firm: Richardson & McKay

Listed Building – Category B
- Official name: 117 Nicolson Street,
- Designated: 8 September 2003
- Reference no.: LB27176

The Southside Community Centre is a community centre in the Southside, Edinburgh, Scotland. The centre opened in 1986 and occupies the former Nicolson Street Church, which was completed in 1820.

Nicolson Street Church originated in 1747 when Adam Gib led the majority of his congregation out of the Secession Church at Bristo in opposition to the Burgher Oath. For this reason, Robert Small called the congregation "the mother Secession Church in Edinburgh". Their first permanent meeting place was a simple building off Crosscauseway. This was replaced by the current building on the same site during the ministry of lexicographer John Jamieson. A succession of denominational unions saw the congregation join the United Secession Church in 1820, the United Presbyterian Church in 1847, the United Free Church in 1900, and the Church of Scotland in 1929. Once a fashionable society church, the congregation faced decline in the post-war years and merged with Buccleuch and Charteris-Pleasance in 1969 to form Kirk o' Field Parish Church. The building was sold to the corporation and, after a period as a furniture saleroom, reopened as the Southside Community Centre in 1986. Managed jointly by the city council and the South Side Association, the centre continues to house a range of community facilities and groups. During the Edinburgh Fringe, it is used as a venue under the name Zoo Southside.

The building was constructed in 1820 to a perpendicular Gothic design by James Gillespie Graham. It was gutted by fire and reconstructed by John Ross McKay in 1932. The building was gutted and partitioned internally ahead of its reopening as the Southside Community Centre in 1986. It has been a Category B listed building since 8 September 2003.

== Nicolson Street Church ==
=== Foundation ===
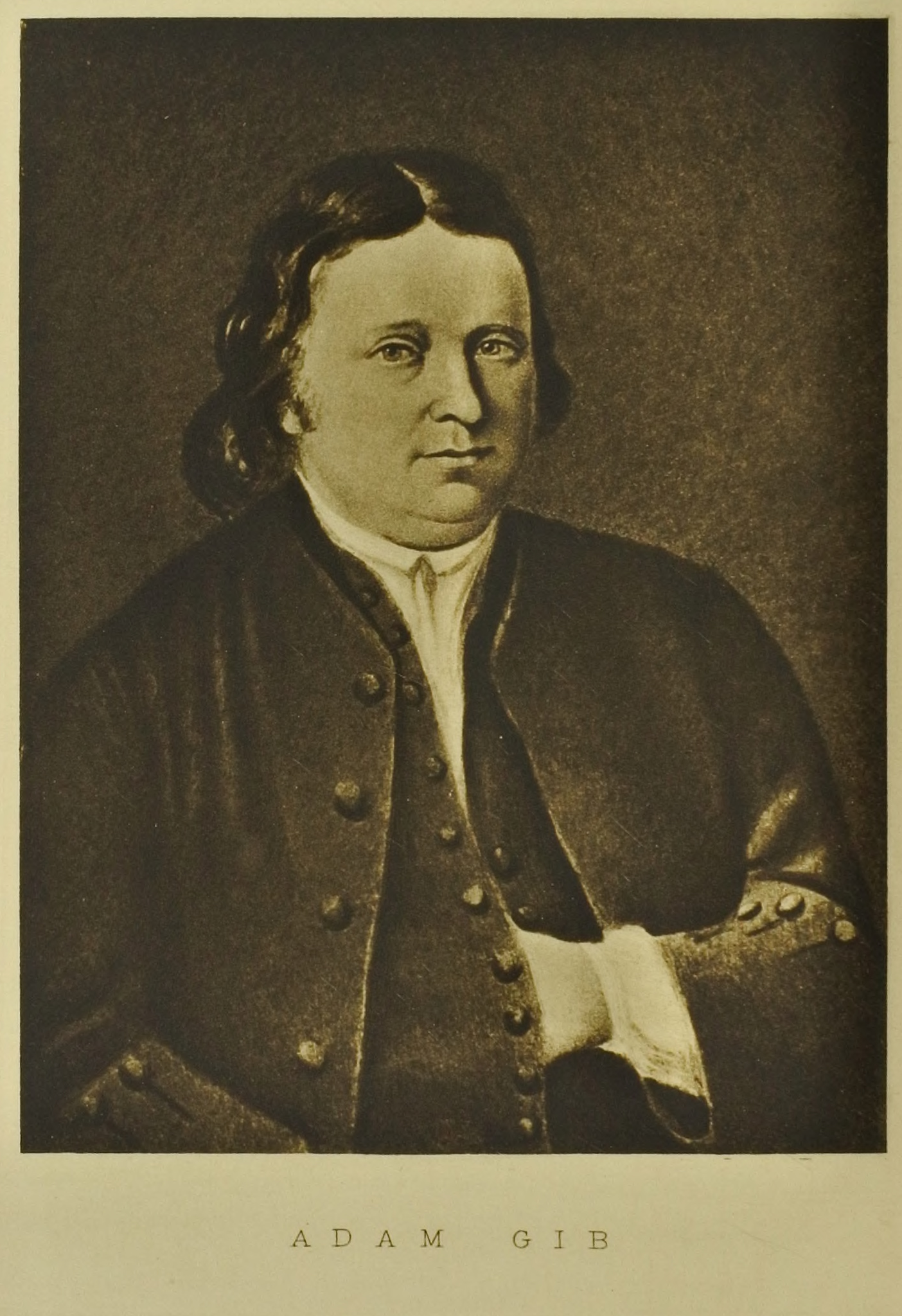
Adam Gib; a leading Anti-Burgher and the congregation's founding minister

Nicolson Street originated in the Secession congregation founded at Bristo in 1741 with Adam Gib as its minister. The Secession Church soon faced a division over the Burgher Oath of 1690, which required public officials to "profess and allow with all my heart the true religion presently professed within this realm and authorised by the laws thereof". One faction – the Anti-Burghers – held that subscription to this oath was sinful while another – the Burghers – believed it was not. At a meeting in Bristo of the Synod on 9 April 1747, members divided in a schism known as "The Breach". During the meeting, Gib led out a faction opposed to the oath out of the meeting-house and into the adjoining manse.

For a year, the two factions worshipped together in Bristo but relations were tense: each used its own collection plate and members of each faction broke into the church to try and change the locks. The issue had to be settled by the Court of Session, which, finding the congregation had not been a body corporate at the time it purchased its lands at Bristo, ruled that the buildings were legally the property of two Burgher trustees. The Anti-Burgher congregation was thus expelled in January 1753. Despite the fact that only one tenth of the congregation remained with the Burghers, these represented its wealthiest elements and counted for a third of the financial contributions to church funds. The fact that the majority joined the Anti-Burghers led Robert Small, historian of the United Presbyterian Church, to call Nicolson Street "the mother Secession Church in Edinburgh".

After their expulsion from the Bristo buildings, the congregation first met in a tent nearby on Windmill Close on 7 January 1753 and afterwards at the Skinners' Hall in the city. A new site off at Quarry Close, off Crosscauseway, was leased in July that year and a new church was opened on 4 November 1753. The building was, in John Wishart's words, "plain, square, and barn-like". It had no seats apart from in the galleries, which were accessed by external stairs. A manse was built at what is now Gib's Entry: a passage named for its first resident. The church remained in place at the construction of Nicolson Street in the 1760s; however, its primary entrance having been via Crosscauseway, the building now presented its rear to the new street.

=== Early years: 1766–1817 ===
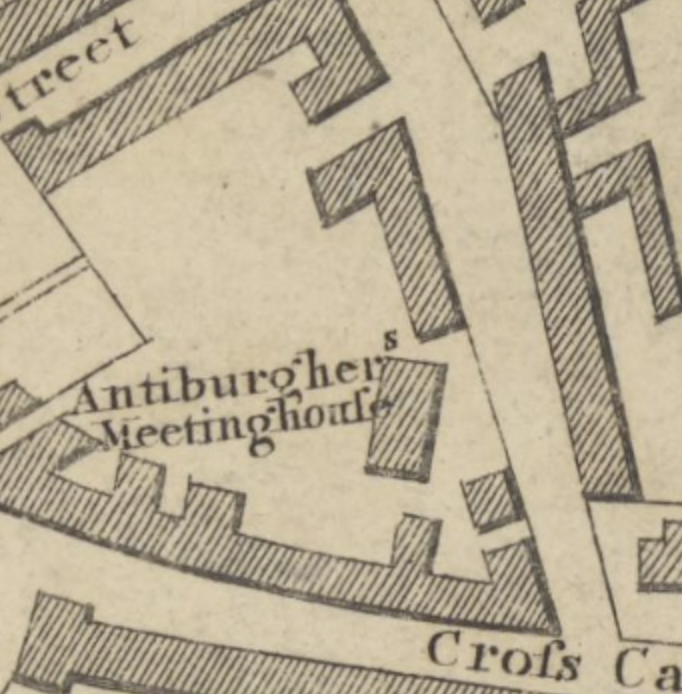
The first meeting-house on a map of 1793, showing its position relative to Nicolson Street (right)

In 1766, some members of the congregation founded an Anti-Burgher congregation in Leith despite opposition from Gib. Gib's refusal to lift the bread to break it during communion services led to some other members of the congregation to depart and set up the Second Secession Church nearby in Potterrow. Gib nevertheless maintained one of the strongest congregations of any denomination in the city. Over 2,000 would regularly come to hear him preach.

Following Gib's death in 1788, the congregation went seven years without a permanent minister. In 1791, a controversy over whether the session or the congregation could manage seat rents led the Anti-Burgher Synod to rule that, in all cases, sessions had authority in their congregation's management. The following year, the synod also allowed for the creation of a new congregation in Edinburgh. Yet, when that congregation was barred from calling Frederick McFarlane as its minister, McFarlane briefly set up as an independent preacher in the Bristo. These factors had much diminished the congregation by the time it appointed a full-time minister, John Banks, in 1794.

During John Jamieson's ministry from 1797 to 1829, the church constructed halls for dual use by the congregation and by the Anti-Burgher Synod. The buildings were also used as the Synod's theological college. While divisions between Burghers and Anti-Burghers were dying down in this period, the controversy within the Anti-Burghers between conservative Auld Lichts and progressive New Lichts was growing. In 1806, some Auld Licht members left to join the Old Secession Church on Infirmary Street.

=== New meeting-house and reunion ===
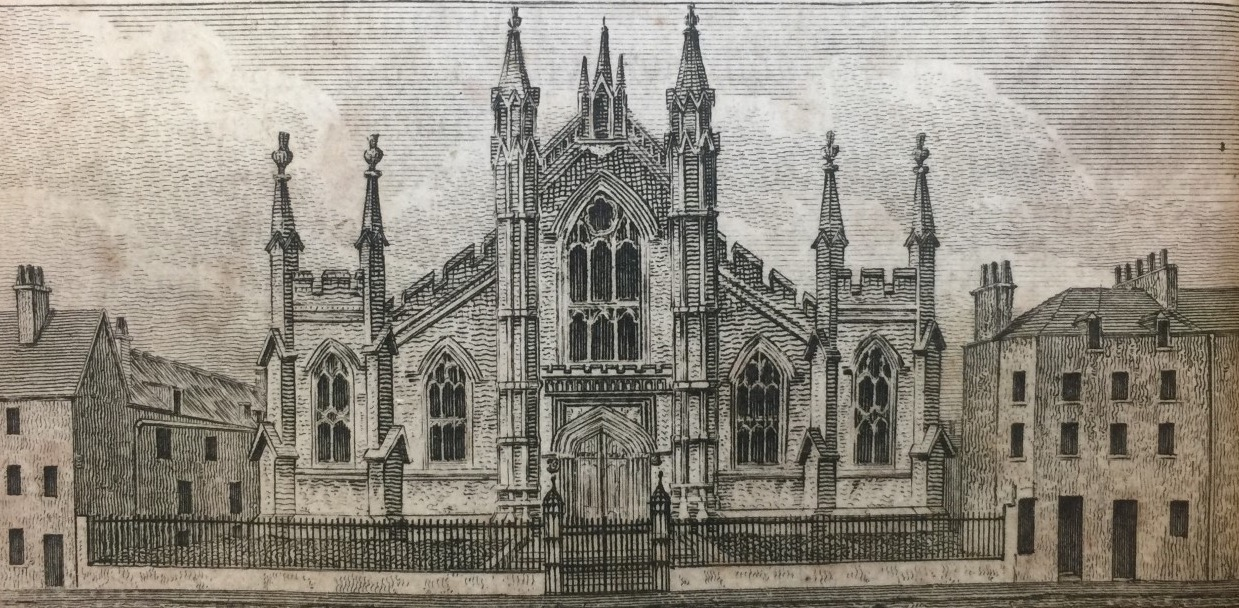
Nicolson Street United Secession Meeting-House shortly after its opening

In September 1817, part of the cornice collapsed during a service and the meeting-house was condemned as unsafe. The congregation had already been raising funds for repairs since 1815. While a new church was being constructed, the Second Secession Church on Potterrow offered its buildings for afternoon services while the Bristo Burgher Meeting-House was used for evening services.

A Gothic Revival design by James Gillespie Graham was chosen and a plot of land was purchased so the new building could face onto Nicolson Street. The new church opened for worship on 19 March 1820. The building cost £6,000 and could accommodate 1,170 worshippers. During this period, the church was known as Dr Jamieson's Meeting-House.

The same year, the Burgher and Anti-Burgher factions united to form the United Secession Church. Nicolson Street's minister, John Jamieson, had been instrumental in the reunion negotiations and was honoured by being elected moderator of the last Anti-Burgher Synod. Dissatisfaction with the Gothic form of the new church led some members to leave; as did the union, which saw some members join an Anti-Union congregation at Castle Wynd then at Infirmary Street. In 1827, they joined Thomas McCrie's congregation at Davie Street.

=== 1820–1900 ===
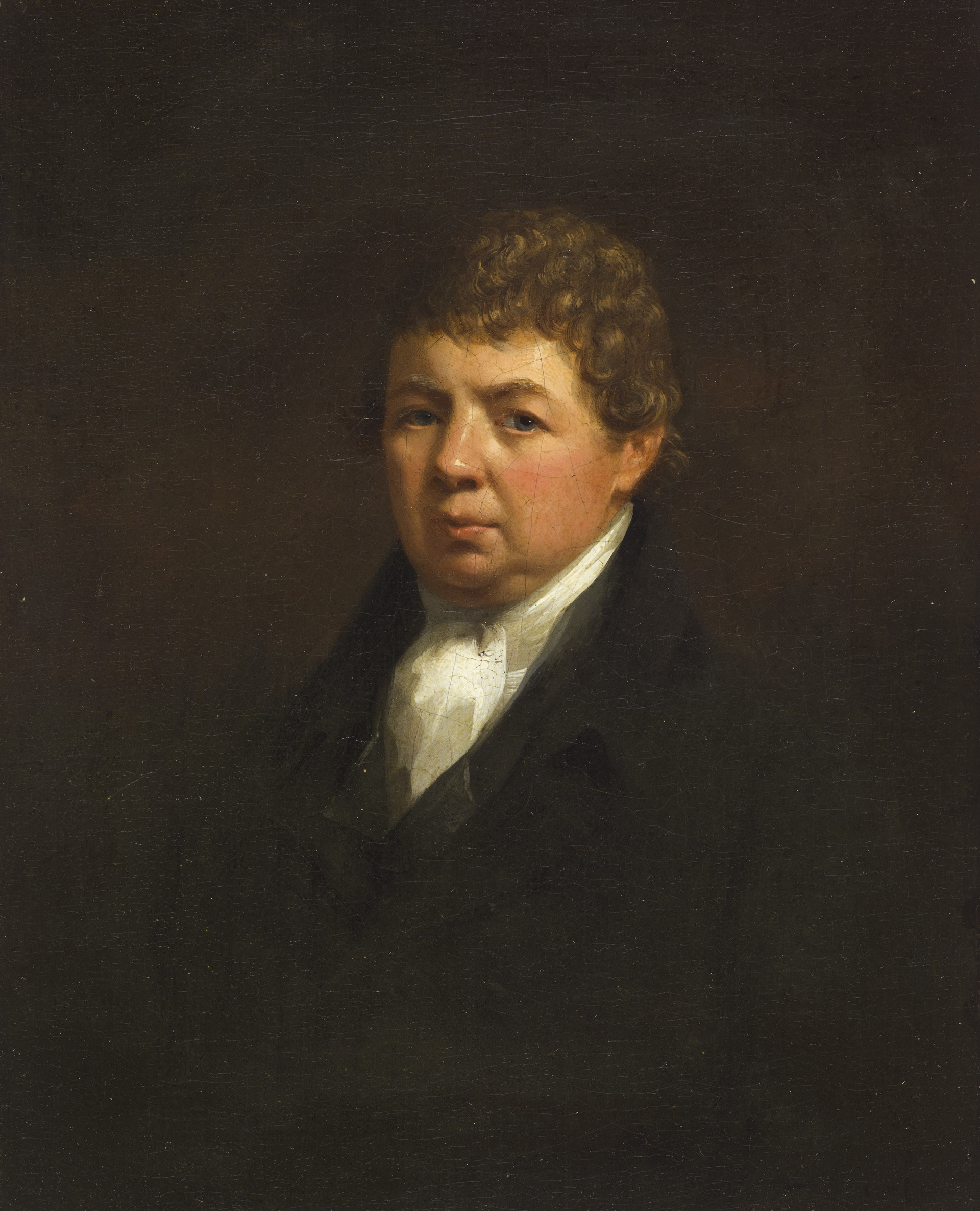
John Jamieson: the congregation's minister between 1797 and 1829 and lexicographer of the Scots language

With the union, the church became one of several Secession congregations in Edinburgh and many members left to join congregations nearer their homes. This loss was compounded by Jamieson's frequent absences for lexicographic work and by difficulties in appointing an assistant minister. With the appointment of George Johnston in 1831, the situation improved: the congregation's roll, which had declined to about 500, doubled in the first year alone.

During Johnston's ministry the church established a school in its halls, which continued until 1858. The congregation also supported foreign and domestic missions, including a mission on Potterrow; raised collections for the abolition of slavery; and founded a savings bank and two friendly societies. In 1833, the congregation founded a missionary society, which continued until the early 20th century. In 1834 alone, the congregation raised a Sunday school and a congregational library, which house 2,000 volumes by 1850. In 1858, Nicolson Street appointed David Kennedy as precentor; though the congregation did not adopt the practice of singing hymns until 1862.

Johnston had been instrumental in the negotiations to unite the United Secession Church with the Relief Church to form the United Presbyterian Church in 1847. In 1852, Johnston was elected moderator of the denomination's general assembly. In the year of the union, some members of Nicolson Street established a new mission at Duncan Street in Newington.

By the end of Johnston's ministry, the Southside was becoming an increasingly working class and industrial neighbourhood and Nicolson Street was losing status as a society church. After Johnston's death in 1871, many members left for suburban churches. David Christie was elected minister in 1897 and proved a popular preacher and lecturer. During his ministry, the church's membership and financial position improved, standing at 754 in 1900.

=== 20th century ===
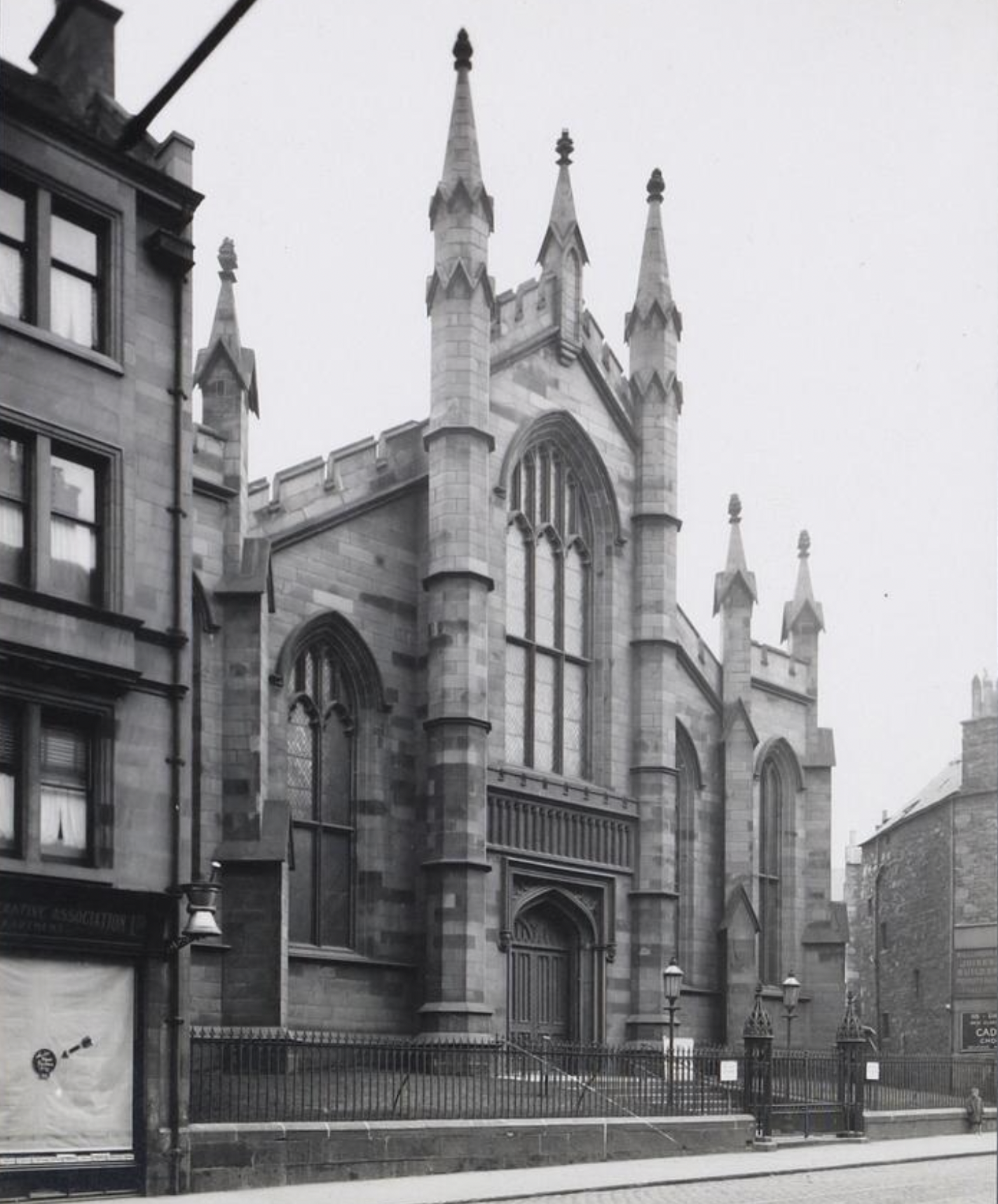
Nicolson Street United Free Church in 1914

In 1900, the United Presbyterian Church united with the Free Church and Nicolson Street joined the newly formed United Free Church. Some members left with the departure of Christie's successor Campbell Macleroy in 1909. Under Macleroy's successor George Wyllie Howie, however, the congregation tripled. Howie also oversaw the establishment of a women's guild of friendship, a men's club, and Scout and Guide troops. The halls were also extended and a pipe organ installed during his ministry.

In 1929, the United Free Church united with the Church of Scotland and the congregation rejoined the denomination from which it had split almost two centuries prior. In 1932, fire gutted the church, necessitating the complete reconstruction of its interior. The interwar years would prove a high point for the congregation's membership, which stood at 1,041 in 1930, declining to 617 by 1960.

With the departure of John Nelson Hall as minister in 1956, union was proposed between Nicolson Street and College on South College Street. Nicolson Street was supportive but College blocked the move. Nicolson Street received around a hundred members from College when that congregation was transported to Muirhouse in 1960. Nicolson Street also took up College's social club. This supplemented a strong roster of church groups, which included a women's guild, a Boys' Brigade troop, missionary societies, and rambling and bowling clubs.

By the 1960s, population decline in the Southside had depleted Nicolson Street and its neighbouring congregations. The church also stood within an area planned for intensive redevelopment by both the corporation and the university. When the ministry of Buccleuch fell vacant in 1964, that congregation sought union with Nicolson Street but this was blocked by the presbytery. Another attempt at union between the two congregations in 1967 failed, as did ambitious plans the same year for a six-way union between Nicolson Street, Buccleuch, Charteris-Pleasance, Newington and St Leonard's, St Paul's Newington, and St Margaret's, Dumbiedykes. The following year, a five-way union, excluding St Paul's Newington, also fell through. Eventually, a three-way union with Buccleuch and Charteris-Pleasance was agreed and a service of union was held on 7 September 1969. The united congregation adopted the name Kirk o' Field and met in the Charteris-Pleasance buildings on the Pleasance.

=== Ministers ===
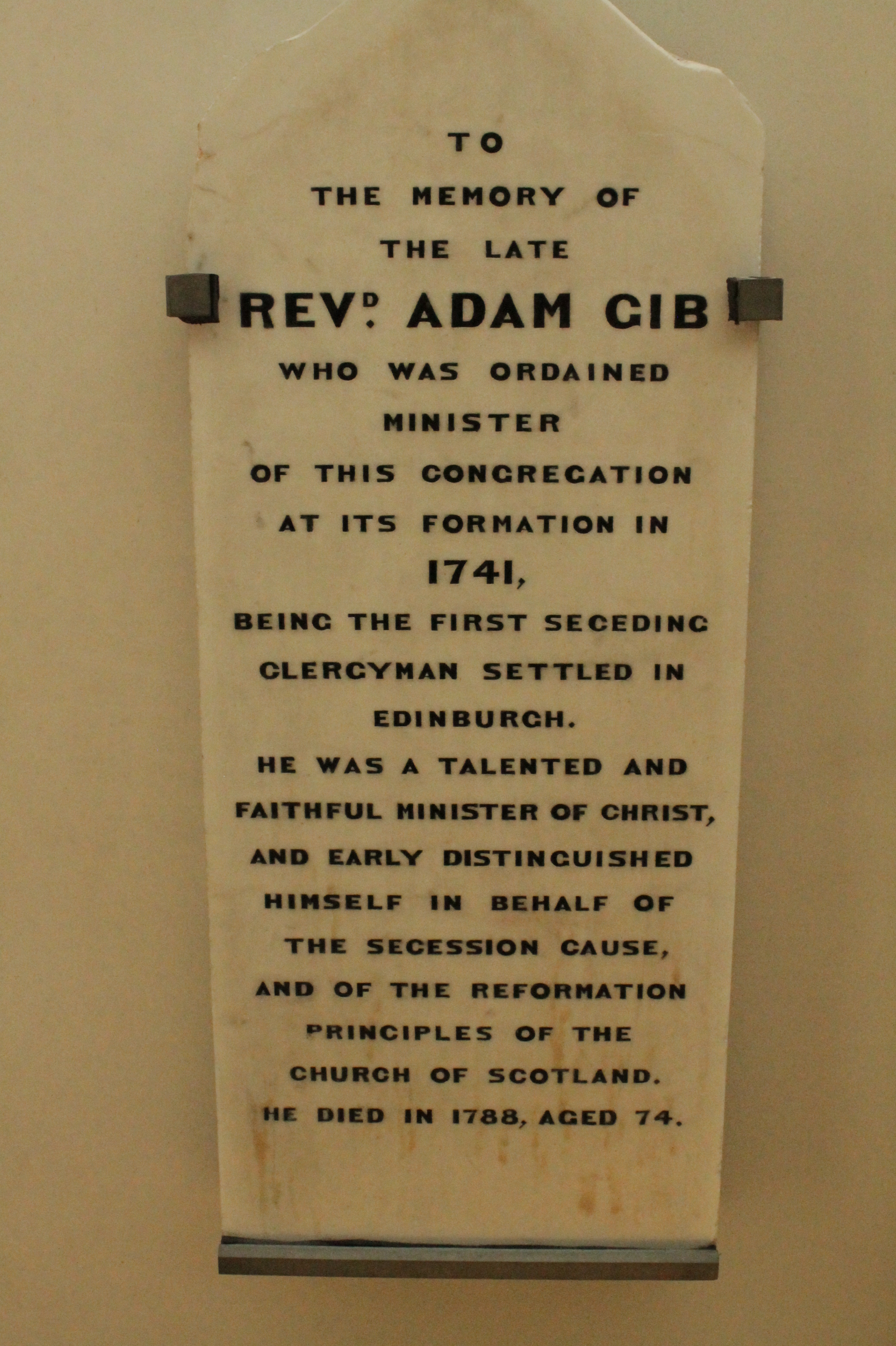
A memorial to Adam Gib, the congregation's first minister: originally housed in Nicolson Street, it now resides in the National Museum of Scotland

The following ministers served Bristo Secession Church (1741–1753); Quarry's Close Anti-Burgher Secession Church (1753–1820); Nicolson Street United Secession Church (1820–1847); Nicolson Street United Presbyterian Church (1847–1900); Nicolson Street United Free Church (1900–1929); and Nicolson Street Church of Scotland (1929–1969).

- 1741–1794 Adam Gib
- 1794–1796 John Banks
- 1797–1829 John Jamieson
- 1831–1871 George Johnston
- 1869–1883 Peter B. Gloag
- 1885–1896 John T. Burton
- 1897–1903 David Christie
- 1904–1909 Campbell MacQueen Macleroy
- 1909–1924 George Wyllie Howie
- 1925–1938 William Galbraith Taylor
- 1939–1943 George Omond MacKenzie
- 1944–1948 Arthur Henry Manson Johnston
- 1949–1956 John Nelson Hall
- 1957–1966 Robert Alexander Robertson

== Southside Community Centre ==
=== History ===
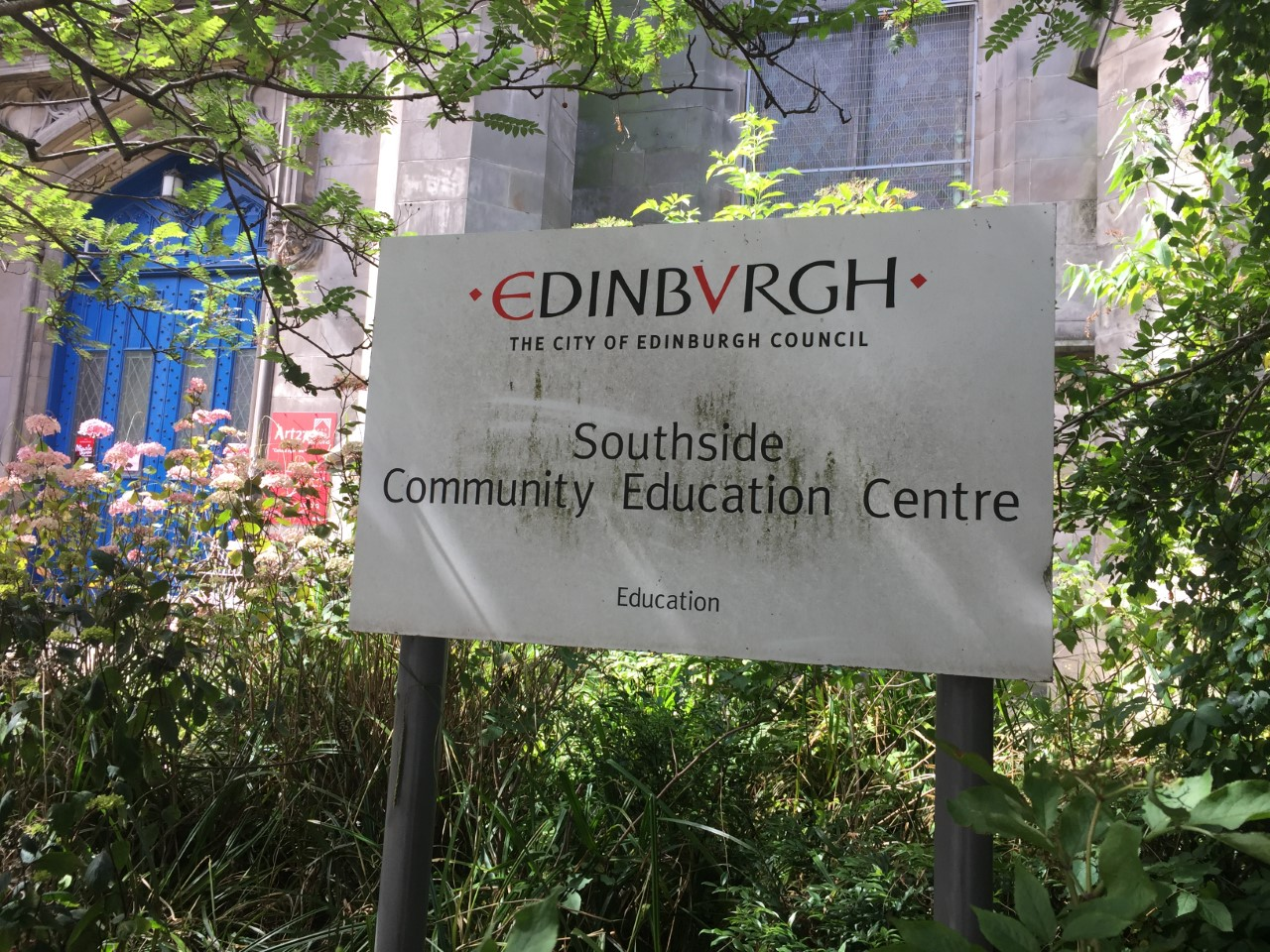
A sign for the "Southside Community Education Centre", evincing an ongoing difference between the city council and the South Side Association over the centre's name

At its closure, Nicolson Street Church was sold to the corporation for use as a community centre; though it was initially used as a furniture saleroom. The community centre is the result of a long campaign by the South Side Association for a permanent meeting place. Prior to the centre's opening, the association had worked across a variety of venues in the Southside. The centre was opened in December 1986 by George Foulkes MP, who, as chair of Lothian Regional Council's Education Committee had supported the procurement process necessary for the centre.

Edinburgh City Council insisted the new venue be named the Southside Community Education Centre while the South Side Association preferred Southside Community Centre. The difference was overcome by having two separate signs, one on either side of the entry, each with the different name. This situation continues to the present.

In its early years, the centre was the site of local political activity, hosting meetings of the Anti-Poll Tax Alliance and as a distribution base for surplus dairy products. The centre also became the site of a children's play-scheme, which used the Meadows for games. The initial plans for the building included a sports centre. This proved impossible; however, the centre supported the creation of the Crags Sports Centre as an alternative.

=== Today ===
The building is owned and staffed by Edinburgh City Council. It is leased to the South Side Community Association and run by a management committee. The building consists of two general purpose rooms, a café, a large hall, and an office. Rooms are available for hire and the centre is used as a venue during the Edinburgh Fringe. Artist who have performed here include Bill Bailey. As a Fringe venue, the centre is presently managed by Zoo Venues as Zoo Southside.

== Building ==
The current buildings was completed in 1820 to a perpendicular design by James Gillespie Graham. The façade consists of five bays with traceried windows beneath a crenellated parapet. The central door is covered by a hood mould on headstops. The bays are divided by pinnacles, which at the outer bays, rise on buttresses. The central two pinnacles rise on shafts to around 90 ft (27.4m). The pinnacles were removed in 1980 but have since been replaced.

The Southside Community Centre has been a Category B listed building since 8 September 2003.

=== Assessment ===
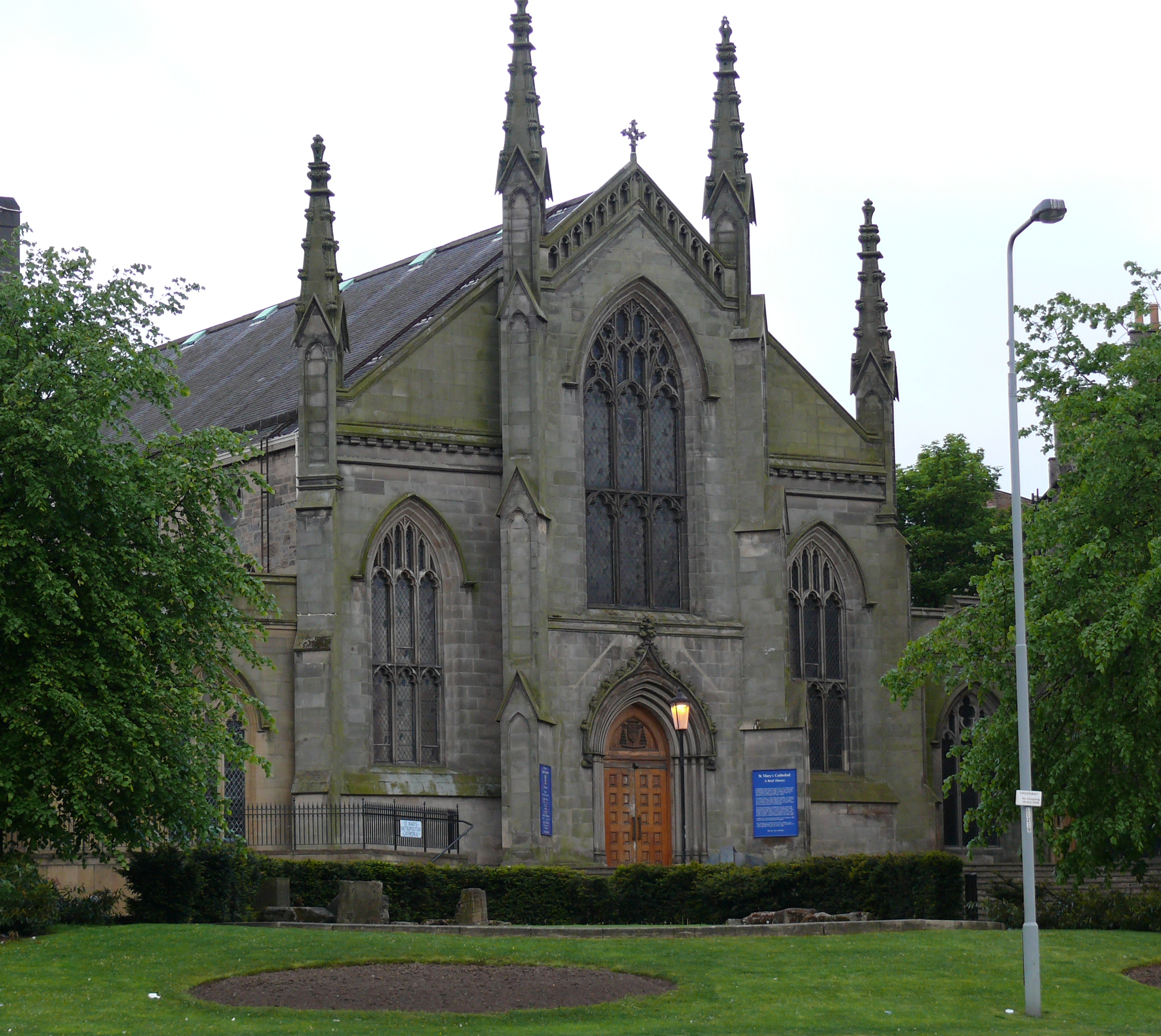
St Mary's Roman Catholic Chapel: an earlier design by James Gillespie Graham with a similar perpendicular façade

Secession churches had tended to be plain and the use of Gothic architecture at Nicolson Street was the subject of controversy even before construction began. The Scotsman commented: "so great is the Gothic rage got that it is even proposed to rebuild the meeting-house of Adam Gib with a Babylonish and Prelatical front of Gothic architecture". John Stark, writing in 1825, identified the headstops of the main door as saints and commented: "This simple circumstance of itself bespeaks a wonderful change in the tone of thinking of the present and last age". Stark also quotes an elderly disciple of Gib, who, when asked what the congregation's founder would have made of the heads, replied: "that he would not believe his ain een". Dissatisafaction with the Gothich form of the new church was among the reasons that some members left Nicolson Street to join a new congregation at Castle Wynd.

Despite this controversy, George Hay cited Nicolson Street as a "typical example" of Secession churches' tendencies to be "a gaunt galleried rectangle with such architectural treatment as funds would permit confined to the street façade". He noted that, in this approach, it is similar to James Gillespie Graham's earlier design for St Mary's Roman Catholic Chapel. Andrew Landale Drummond, writing in 1934, described the church as "a square meeting-house masked by a pretentious Gothic façade".

=== Alterations and fittings ===
After fire gutted the church in 1932, the interior was reconstructed under John Ross McKay. McKay removed the side galleries while reconstructing a larger gallery over the entry. The interior now centred on a central niche. The organ, which had formerly stood over the pulpit, was recessed in this niche over the vestries and behind a carved wooden screen. In front of this stood pulpit, which incorporated a niche for a font, and the communion table, which incorporated two plaques from the church's First World War memorial. This arrangement stood on a raised platform, which incorporated a sunken pit for the organ console. The whole arrangement, as well as the flat ceiling and the gallery front, incorporated detailed wood carving and took inspiration from Robert Lorimer's designs for the Scottish National War Memorial. The communion table was moved to Kirk o' Field after Nicolson Street's closure. At the church's conversion to a community centre, the interior was gutted and partitioned.

The church's first pipe organ was a two-manual instrument of 1912 by Eustace Ingram. Ingram rebuilt the organ after the 1932 fire. The organ was removed in 1973 and parts of it reused at Carrick Knowe Parish Church.

== Notes ==
=== Bibliography ===
- Drummond, Andrew Landale (1934). The Church Architecture of Protestantism. T. & T. Clark.
- Dunlop, Ian G. (1988). The Kirks of Edinburgh: 1560–1984. Scottish Record Society. ISBN 0902054104.
- Gray, William Forbes (1940). Historic Churches of Edinburgh. Moray Press.
- Hay, George (1957). The Architecture of Scottish Post-Reformation Churches: 1560 to 1843. Oxford University Press.
- Lamb, John Alexander
  - The Fasti of the United Free Church of Scotland: 1900–1929. Oliver and Boyd. 1956.
  - Fasti Ecclesiae Scoticanae: The Succession of Ministers in the Church of Scotland from the Reformation: Volume IX: Ministers of the Church from the Union of the Churches, 2nd October 1929, to 31 December 1954. Oliver and Boyd. 1961.
- MacDonald, Donald Farquhar MacLeod (1981). Fasti Ecclesiae Scoticanae: The Succession of Ministers in the Church of Scotland from the Reformation: Volume X: Ministers of the Church from 1 January 1955 to 31 December 1975. The Saint Andrew Press. ISBN 0715204955.
- MacKelvie, William (1873). Annals and Statistics of the United Presbyterian Church. Oliphant and Company.
- McKerrow, John (1839). History of the Secession Church. Edinburgh: William Oliphant and Son.
- Palmer, Neil (2007). Memories of Nicolson Street Church, the Community Centre & the South Side. South Side Community Centre.
- Pinkerton, Roy M.
  - Kirk o' Field and the Churches of Edinburgh's South Side. J Thomson Colour Printers. 2012.
  - Threads in a Tapestry: The Greyfriars Congregations. ClaroPrint. 2020.
- Wishart, John (1953). The Story of Nicolson Street Church of Scotland. William Ritchie & Sons.
- Scott, Hew
  - Fasti Ecclesiae Scoticanae: The Succession of Ministers in the Church of Scotland from the Reformation (New Edition): Volume I: Synod of Lothian and Tweeddale. Oliver and Boyd. 1915.
  - Fasti Ecclesiae Scoticanae: The Succession of Ministers in the Church of Scotland from the Reformation: Volume VIII: Ministers of the Church from the Date of Publication of Volumes I-VII, 1914–1928, to the Union of the Churches, 2nd October 1929, and Addenda and Corrigenda 1960-1949. Oliver and Boyd. 1950.
- Small, Robert (1904). History of the Congregations of the United Presbyterian Church from 1733 to 1900. David M Small.
- Stark, John (1825). Picture of Edinburgh: Containing a Description of the City and its Environs (4th ed.). John Fairbairn.
- Thin, James (1879). Memorials of Bristo United Presbyterian Church. Morrison & Gibb.
