= John Jamieson =

Scottish lexicographer (1759–1838)

John Jamieson FRSE FSA Scot FRSL
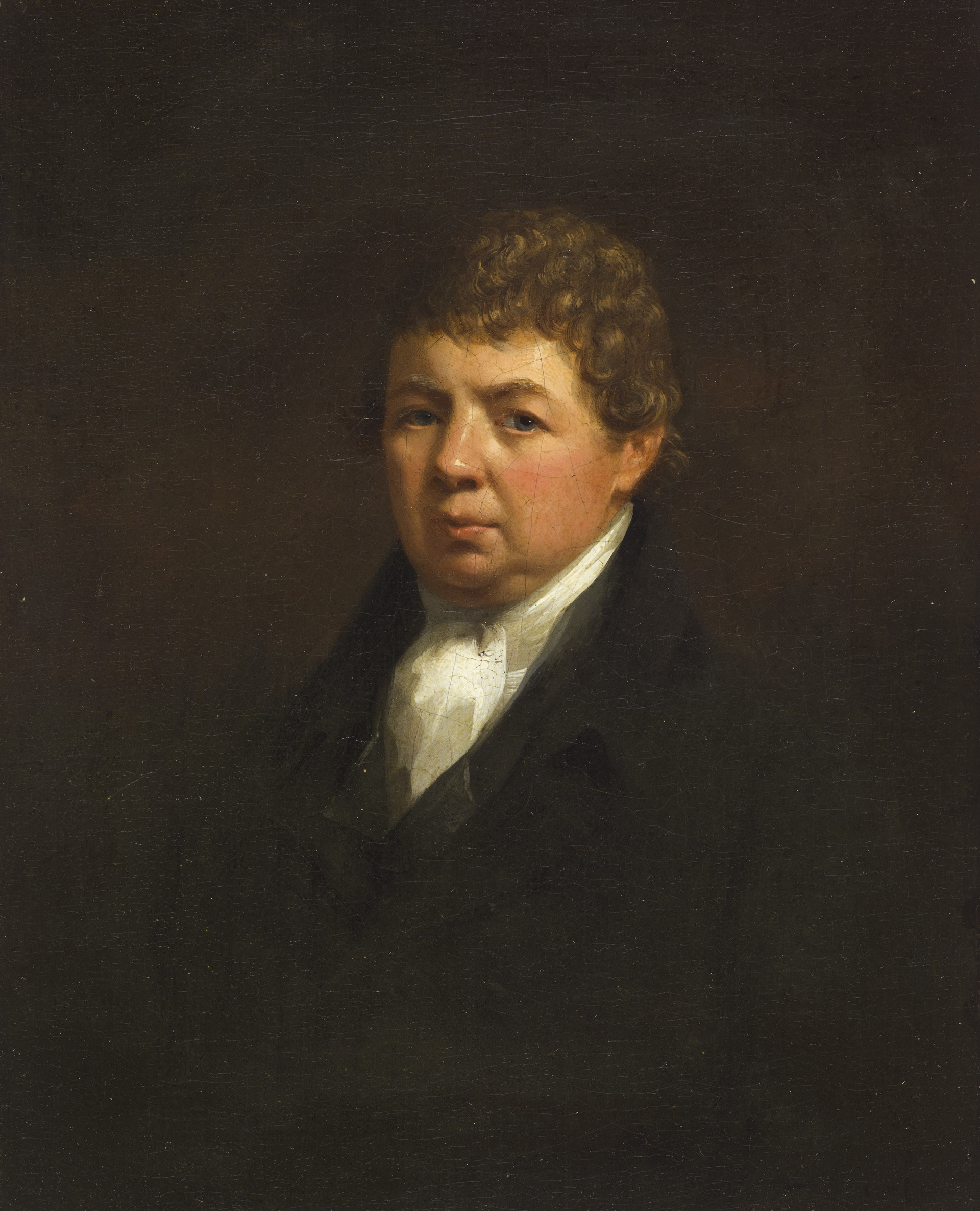
- John Jamieson by William Yellowlees
- Born: 3 March 1759; Glasgow
- Died: 12 July 1838 (aged 79); George Square, Edinburgh
- Resting place: St. Cuthbert's Cemetery, Edinburgh
- Citizenship: Great Britain
- Education: Glasgow Grammar School
- Alma mater: Glasgow University (1768-71); Edinburgh University (1775-6); College of New Jersey (DD 1795)
- Occupations: Licensed minister (1781); Minister of secessionist congregation Forfar, Angus; Minister of the Nicolson Street Antiburgher Church, Edinburgh (1797–1830)
- Notable work: "Etymological Dictionary of The Scottish Language" (1808) "History of the Culdees" (1811) "Views of the Royal Palaces of Scotland" (1828)
- Spouse: Charlotte Watson (died 1837)

Notes
- Fellow of the Royal Society of Edinburgh (1803); Fellow of the Society of Antiquaries of Scotland (1815); Fellow of the American Antiquarian Society; Fellow of the Royal Literary Society; Member of the Highland Society

John Jamieson (3 March 1759 – 12 July 1838) was a Scottish minister of religion, lexicographer, philologist and antiquary. His most important work is the Etymological Dictionary of the Scottish Language.

== Life ==
He was born in Glasgow in March 1759 the son of Rev John Jamieson, minister of the Associate Congregation on Duke Street. He was educated at Glasgow Grammar School.

He studied at the University of Glasgow 1768 to 1771, and subsequently attended classes in Divinity at the University of Edinburgh, 1775–6. After six years' theological study, Jamieson was licensed to preach in 1781 and became pastor of the Secessionist (Anti-burgher) congregation in Forfar, Angus. He was 23 years old at the time and was ordained on 23 August 1780 and the following August being involved in a "romantic, moonlit marriage".

In 1788 he was asked to replace Rev Adam Gib at the Anti-burgher church in Nicolson Street, Edinburgh, but did not accept this until its next vacancy, being inducted on 30 May 1797. The union of the Burgher and Anti-Burgher "New Licht" churches to form the United Secession Church in 1820 was largely due to his exertions.

He retired from the ministry in 1830, spending the rest of his life in Edinburgh. In the 1830s he is listed as living at 4 George Square on the south side of the city.

Jamieson was elected a Fellow of the Royal Society of Edinburgh in 1803. His proposers were James Bonar, Alexander Fraser Tytler, and William Moodie. He was also a Fellow of the Society of Antiquaries of Scotland. He was elected a member of the American Antiquarian Society in 1816.

In 1827 he was elected a member of the Bannatyne Club.

He retired due to ill health in 1830 and died at home, 4 George Square, Edinburgh on 12 July 1838 and is buried in St Cuthbert's churchyard. He was buried with his son Robert (who pre-deceased him) in a large and elaborate grave in the southern section. His inscription is on the rear of the monument.

== Works ==
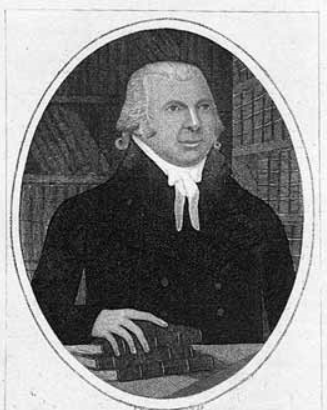
John Jamieson by John Kay

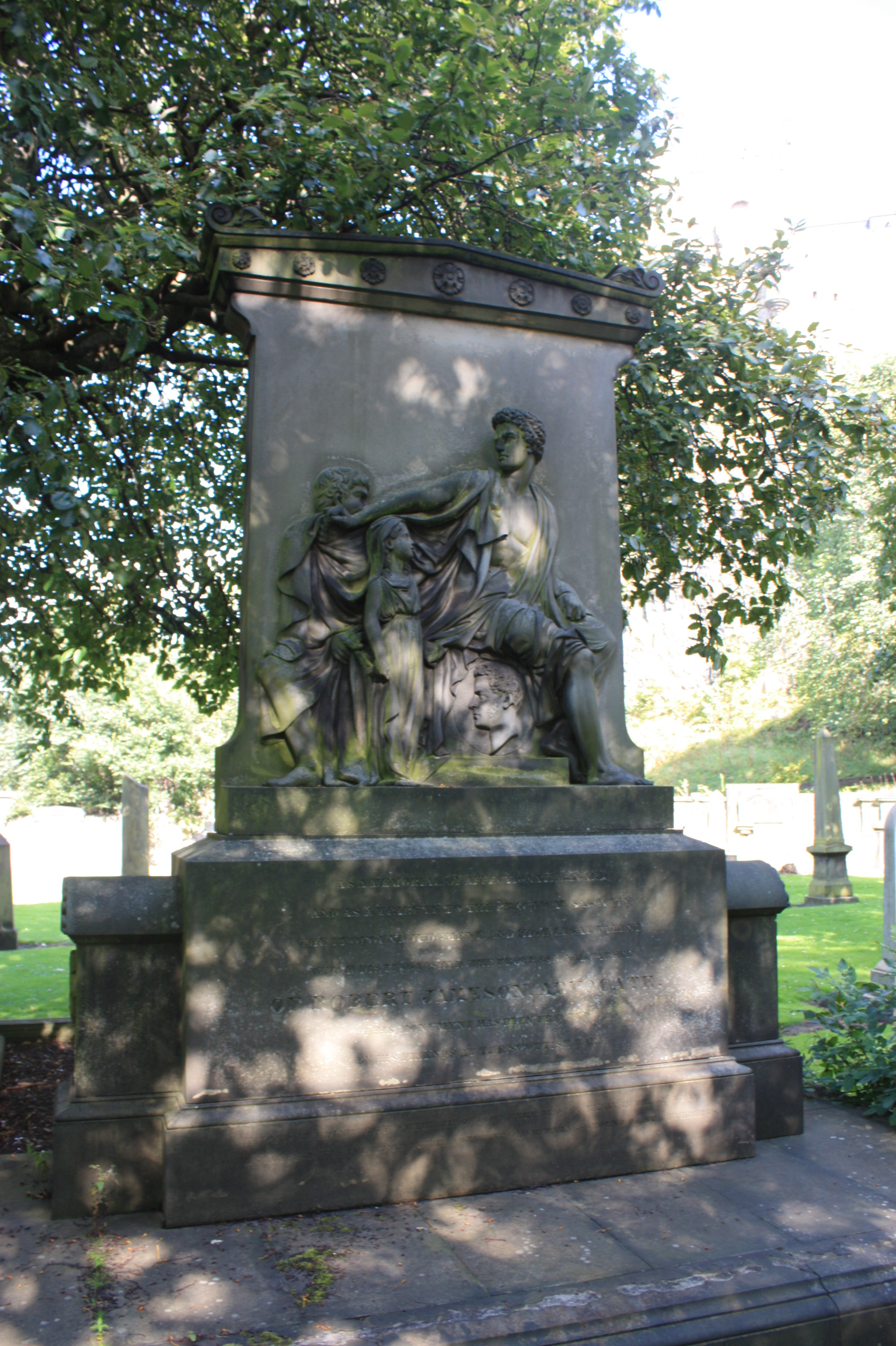
The grave of Rev John Jamieson, St Cuthberts Churchyard, Edinburgh

Jamieson's major work, the Etymological Dictionary of the Scottish Language appeared in 2 vols. in 1808. A meeting the Danish scholar Grim Thorkelin had suggested this work, and, working with Thomas Ruddiman's glossary to Gavin Douglas's version of the Aeneid, Jamieson completed the work almost alone. He prepared an abridgment in 1818 (reissued in 1846 with a memoir by John Johnstone), and aided by numerous others, he added two supplementary volumes in 1825. The work drew on folklore and provincialisms. The introductory antiquarian dissertation supported a theory on the Pictish influence on the Scots language. A revised edition by John Longmuir and David Donaldson was issued in 1879–87. These volumes remained the standard reference work for the Scots language until the publication of the Scottish National Dictionary in 1931.

Jamieson's other works included:

- Socinianism Unmasked, 1786.
- The Sorrows of Slavery, 1789, a pamphlet on the African slave trade
- Sermons on the Heart, 2 vols., 1791. Around the same time as The Sorrows of Slavery.
- Congal and Fenella, a Metrical Tale, 1791.
- Vindication of the Doctrine of Scripture, in reply to Joseph Priestley's History of Early Opinions, 2 vols., 1795.
- A Poem on Eternity, 1798.
- Remarks on Rowland Hill's Journal, 1799.
- The Use of Sacred History, 1802, vol.1, vol.2
- Important Trial in the Court of Conscience, 1806.
- Etymological Dictionary of the Scottish Language, 2 vols 1808.
- A Treatise on the Ancient Culdees of Iona also retitled A History of the Culdees, 1811, published, through Walter Scott's support, by Ballantyne.
- Hermes Scythicus, 1814, expounding affinities between the Gothic and the classical tongues.
- Supplement to the Etymological Dictionary of the Scottish Language, 2 vols 1825.
- Views of the Royal Palaces of Scotland (1828) published posthumously

Jamieson wrote on other themes: rhetoric, cremation, and the royal palaces of Scotland, besides publishing occasional sermons. In 1820 he issued edited versions of John Barbour's Bruce and Blind Harry's Wallace. Posthumous was Dissertations on the Reality of the Spirit's Influence (1844).

== Family ==
In 1781, Jamieson married Charlotte Watson (died 1837), daughter of Robert Watson, Esq., of Easter Rhind, Perthshire, and had seventeen children, of whom only two daughters and one son survived. His son, Robert Jameson (died 1834) advocate, became a distinguished member of the Faculty of Advocates. His daughter Margaret Robina married Donald Mackenzie of the 21st Fusiliers and was mother of Donald Mackenzie, Lord Mackenzie.
