= William Oliver (businessman) =

Scottish business advisor

Sir William Oliver FRSE (1885–1962) was a 20th-century Scottish business advisor and the first Professor of Organisation of Industry and Commerce.

== Life ==
Oliver was born in Edinburgh in 1885. He was educated at George Watson's College. He then studied engineering at the University of Edinburgh (specialising in electrical engineering) before joining Parsons Peebles Ltd. working on power plant design and creation.

In 1919 he began lecturing in the Organisation of Business and Commerce, the cost being underwritten by Edinburgh Chamber of Commerce and other city business interests. In 1925 the University of Edinburgh made him their first Professor of Organisation of Business and Commerce. He held this role until 1953 when he was replaced by Professor Norman Charles Hunt. It was then under the umbrella of the Faculty of Arts.

Hee left Pasons Peebles Ltd around 1920 and joined Mitchell Graham & Co Ltd where he eventually became Managing Director. In 1938 he founded the company Turbulayr Products Ltd, specialists in sheet metal products. In 1939 he patented the Aeratone therapeutic bath which sold well to spas and clubs.

In 1930 he was elected a Fellow of the Royal Society of Edinburgh. His proposers were Sir Edward Albert Sharpey-Schafer, James Watt, Frederick Wolff Ogilvie and James Hartley Ashworth.

He died suddenly in Edinburgh on 19 November 1962.
