= John Longmuir (poet) =

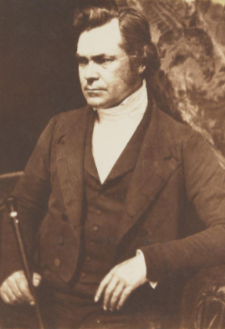
Rev John Longmuir of Aberdeen

John Longmuir MA LLD (1803–1883) was a Scottish minister of first the Church of Scotland then the Free Church of Scotland. He is mainly remembered as a poet and antiquary.

== Life ==
He was born on 13 November 1803 at Fetteresso near Stonehaven, Kincardineshire, the son of John Longmuir, a sailor, and his wife, Christian Paterson. He was christened on 17 November 1803.

John Longmuir was Keeper of the Ruins of Dunnottar Castle and at one time butler at Ury House, Stonehaven.

In 1814 the family moved to Aberdeen. He was educated at Aberdeen Grammar School and then studied at Marischal College graduating M.A. in 1825. In 1824 he was teaching in Aberdeen, living at 62 Loch Street; he taught for some years in schools at both Stonehaven and Forres. The presbytery of Forres licensed him to preach in July 1833.

In 1837, Longmuir was appointed evening lecturer in Trinity Chapel, Aberdeen, and in September 1840 was ordained by the Church of Scotland as minister of the Mariners' Chapel in Aberdeen. At the Disruption of 1843 he went over with most of his congregation to the Free Church of Scotland. A new Free Mariners Church was built on Commerce Street in 1844. This was renamed Commerce Street Free Church in 1881 when Longmuir retired and was replaced by Rev A. Murray Scott.

Longmuir was for some years lecturer on geology at King's College, Aberdeen, and in 1859 was granted the honorary doctorate of LL.D.

He retired in 1881 and died at Hawthorn Cottage, 5 Dee Place in Aberdeen on 7 May 1883.

== Family ==
He was twice married, firstly to Lillias Milne in 1835, and secondly to Dorothy Hawthorn Dixon in 1857.

His son Alexander Davidson Longmuir (1843-1891) was an artist of note.

== Works ==
Longmuir's first publication was The College and other Poems (anon., Aberdeen, 1825). The leading poem dealt with the defects of the academic system of the time. Three later volumes of verse were Bible Lays, a collection of original poems (1st. edit. Aberdeen, 1838; 2nd edit. Edinburgh, 1877); Ocean Lays, a compilation, with twenty-five original poems (Edinburgh, 1854); and Lays for the Lambs, forty-two pieces written for the children of his church (Aberdeen, 1860).

He produced two guidebooks, one to Dunnottar Castle (Aberdeen, 1835), many editions; the other to Speyside (Aberdeen, 1860). His Maiden Stone of Bennachie (Aberdeen, 1869), on the Maiden Stone monolith, put a tradition connected with it into verse. In A Run through the Land of Burns and the Covenanters (Aberdeen, 1872) he attacked Mark Napier's attempt to disprove that two female covenanters were drowned at Wigtown, and celebrated the "two Margarets" in verse. His edition of Alexander Ross of Lochlee's Helenore (Edinburgh, 1866) appeared with a life of the author.

Longmuir was also a lexicographer. He edited a combined version of John Walker's and Noah Webster's Dictionaries (London, 1864), and Walker's Rhyming Dictionary (London, 1865), with an introduction on English versification. A revision of John Jamieson's etymological Scottish Dictionary provided his major work. His abridged edition was issued at Aberdeen in 1867, and a complete edition in 4 vols. (Paisley, 1879–82). On the title-page he appears as joint-editor with David Donaldson.

Several of Longmuir's sermons were published separately, generally with an original hymn attached. He was popular as a platform speaker, and successful as a temperance advocate.
