= William Laughton =

Scottish minister

William Laughton (1812–7 November 1897) was a Scottish minister of the Free Church of Scotland who served as Moderator of the General Assembly to the Free Church 1881/82.

== Life ==
Laughton was born in London in 1812, the eldest son of Captain William Laughton from Orkney in Scotland. His father died of yellow fever in the West Indies in 1813, while he was an infant. His mother then moved to stay with relatives in Fife before moving to lodgings at 10 Carnegie Street in Edinburgh in 1825. From around 1826 William lived at lodgings with a Secession minister, the Rev Mr Jamieson of East Linton. Mrs Laughton died in 1837.

He studied divinity at the University of Edinburgh from around 1830 to 1833. He worked as a missionary in St Mary's parish in Edinburgh under Rev Henry Grey from 1835 to 1837, and assisted Rev Mr Sieveright from 1837 to 1839 in Markinch in Fife.

He was ordained by the Church of Scotland at the newly built St Thomas's Church in Greenock in 1839. From 1841 he campaigned against the patronage system in the Scottish church. In the Disruption of 1843 he left the established church and joined the Free Church of Scotland. The building and congregation also transferred to the Free Church. In 1857 a new St Thomas's Free Church was opened by Rev Robert Candlish on Blackhall Street in Greenock and William Laughton took charge of this new church. In the winter of 1860 Laughton spent the winter in Rome holding services covertly in the fledgling congregation.

In 1845 he is listed as Chaplain of the Greenock Gaelic School Society. He was also for many years chaplain of the Female Benevolent Society, a director of Greenock Academy, and a member of the first Burgh School Board.

In 1881 he succeeded Rev Thomas Main as Moderator of the General Assembly, the highest position in the Free Church. The University of Edinburgh awarded him an honorary doctorate (DD) during his year in office.

He retired in 1886 having become deaf and blind (retirement being referred to in the Free Church as becoming a "senior minister"). When the Presbytery met to decide the matter of his retirement, so much was he looked up to, that one of their number said that he never had known a minister who stood in the same relation to his brethren as did Dr. Laughton. "Every co-presbyter, regards him with an affection and veneration that is quite singular." He moved to Edinburgh to live with friends. He had a ground-breaking operation which restored his eyesight in 1895 and moved to a house at 28 Greenhill Gardens. He fell ill on 1 November 1897 and was tended by Dr Patrick Heron Watson. He died at home in Edinburgh on 7 November 1897 aged 85.

== Family ==
His sister was Jane Laughton (1809–1887), who lived with him as his housekeeper. He died unmarried.
