= Free Church of Scotland (1843–1900) =

Calvinist church split from the Church of Scotland in 1843; itself split in 1900

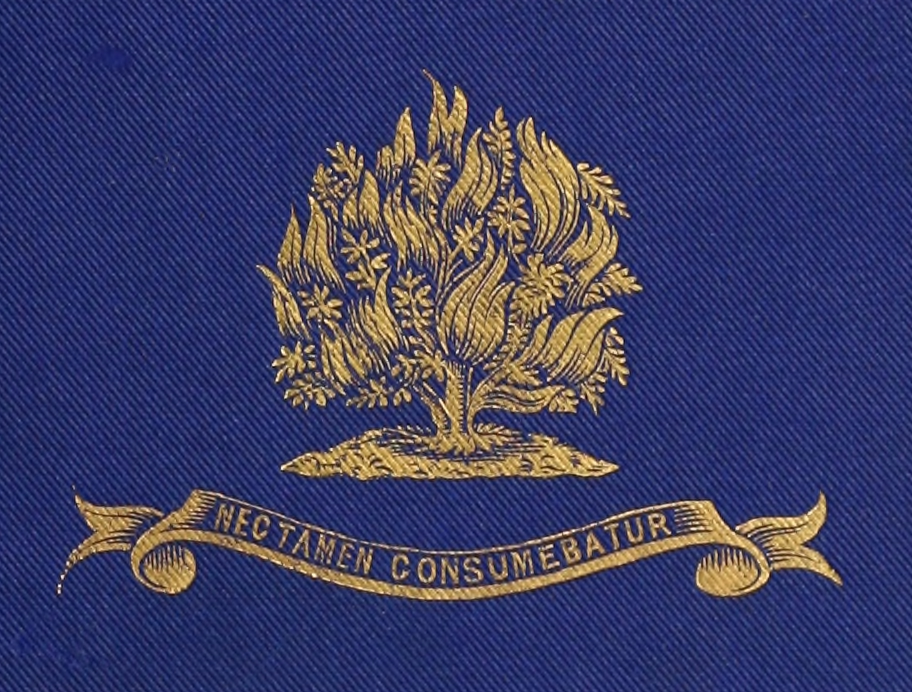
- Classification: Protestant
- Orientation: Calvinist
- Polity: Presbyterian
- Founder: Thomas Chalmers
- Origin: 18 May 1843; Church of St. Andrew, Edinburgh
- Separated from: Church of Scotland
- Separations: Free Presbyterian Church of Scotland (separated 1893)

The Free Church of Scotland (Scottish Gaelic: Eaglais Shaor na h-Alba) was a Scottish denomination which was formed in 1843 by a large withdrawal from the established Church of Scotland in a schism known as the Disruption of 1843. In 1900, the vast majority of the Free Church of Scotland joined with the United Presbyterian Church of Scotland to form the United Free Church of Scotland (which itself mostly re-united with the Church of Scotland in 1929). In 1904, the House of Lords judged that the constitutional minority that did not enter the 1900 union were entitled to the whole of the church's patrimony (see Bannatyne v. Overtoun); the residual Free Church of Scotland acquiesced in the division of those assets, between itself and those who had entered the union, by a Royal Commission in 1905. Despite the late founding date, the leadership held a doctrine of unbroken succession of leaders going back to the Apostles.

== Origins ==
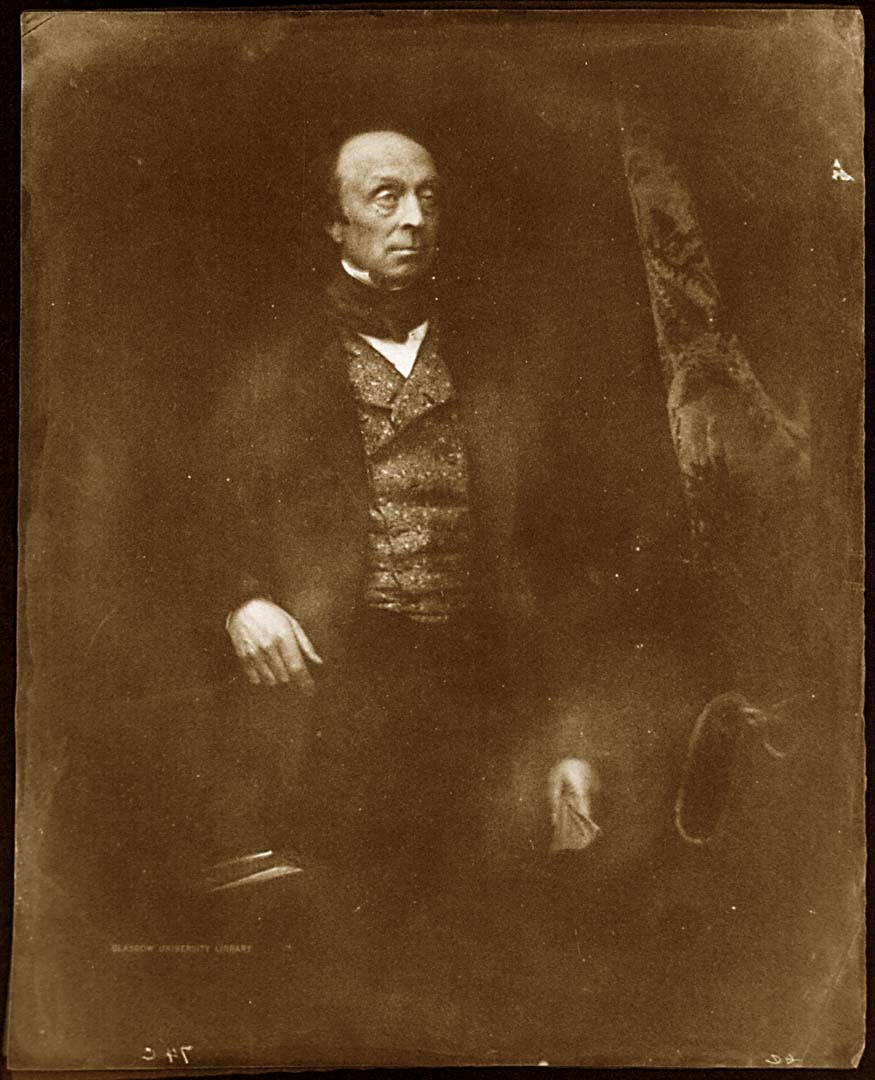
Alexander Colquhoun-Stirling-Murray-Dunlop by Hill & Adamson

The Free Church was formed by Evangelicals who broke from the establishment of the Church of Scotland in 1843 in protest against what they regarded as the state's encroachment on the spiritual independence of the Church. Leading up to the Disruption, many of the issues were discussed from an evangelical position in Hugh Miller's widely circulating newspaper The Witness. Of the driving personalities behind the Disruption, Thomas Chalmers was probably the most influential, with Robert Smith Candlish perhaps second. Alexander Murray Dunlop, the church lawyer, was also very involved.

The Disruption of 1843 was a bitter, nationwide division which split the established Church of Scotland. It was larger than the previous historical secessions of 1733 or 1761. The evangelical element had been demanding the purification of the Church, and it attacked the patronage system, which allowed rich landowners to select the local ministers. It became a political battle between evangelicals on one side and the "Moderates" and gentry on the other. The evangelicals secured passage by the church's General Assembly in 1834, of the "Veto Act", asserting that, as a fundamental law of the Church, no pastor should be forced by the gentry upon a congregation contrary to the popular will, and that any nominee could be rejected by majority of the heads of families. This direct blow at the right of private patrons was challenged in the civil courts, and was decided (1838) against the evangelicals. In 1843, 450 evangelical ministers (out of 1,200 ministers in all) broke away, and formed the Free Church of Scotland.

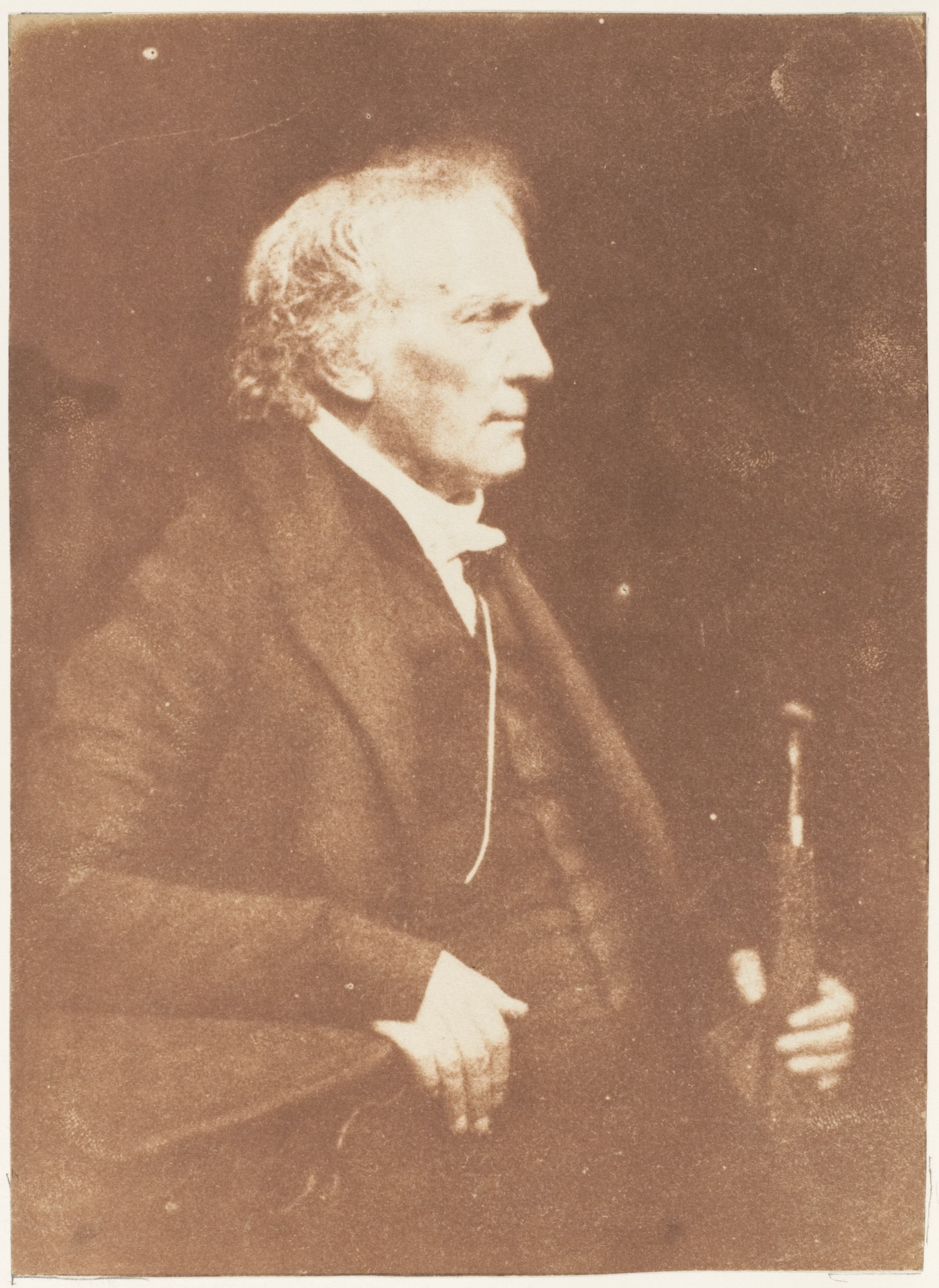
Thomas Chalmers, the Free Church's first Moderator

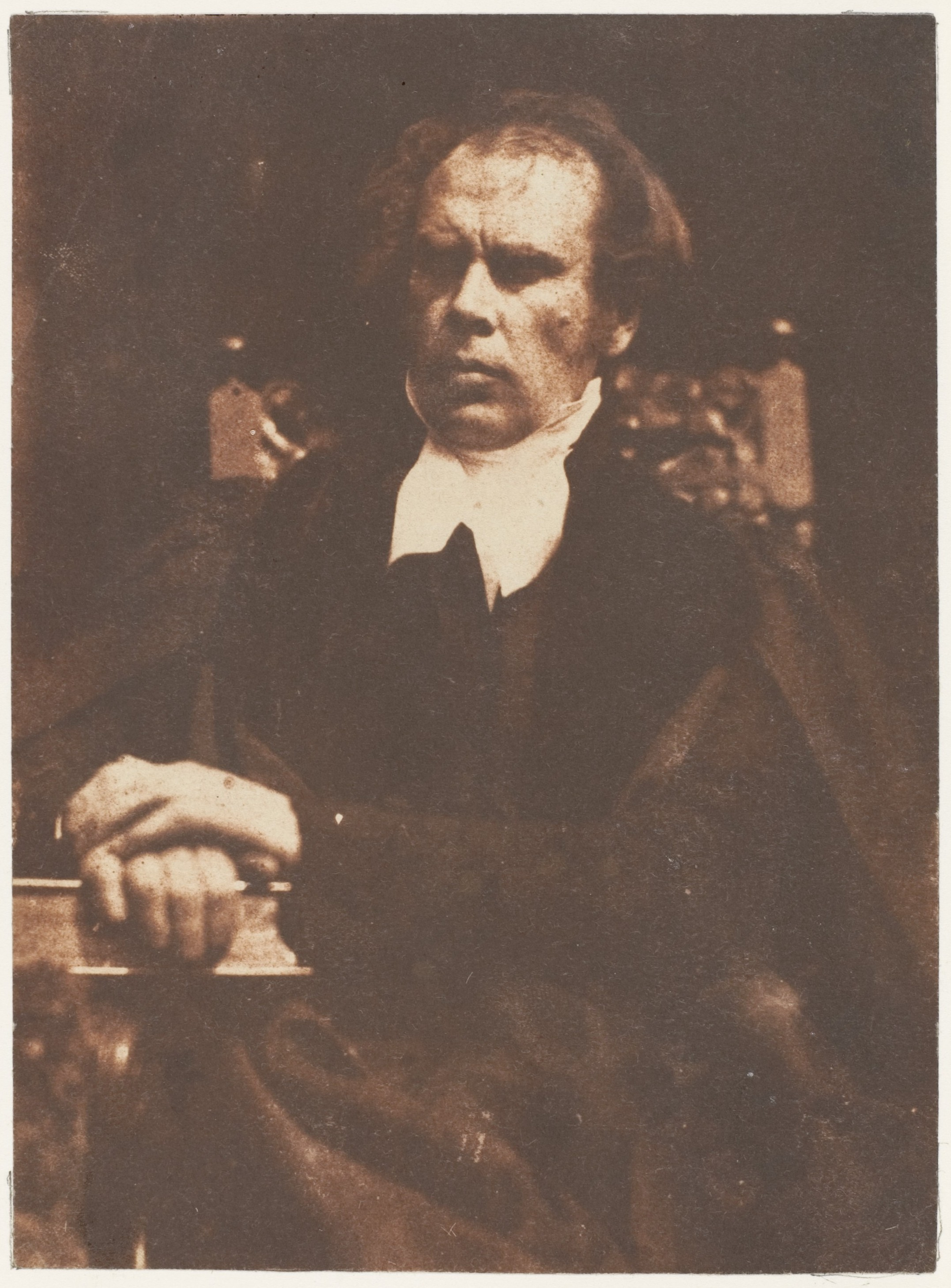
Dr. Welsh, the Church of Scotland's Moderator, who preached, read a Protest and walked out.

Led by Dr Thomas Chalmers (1780–1847), a third of the membership walked out, including nearly all the Gaelic-speakers and the missionaries, and most of the Highlanders. The established Church kept all the properties, buildings and endowments. The seceders created a voluntary fund of over £400,000 to build 700 new churches; 400 manses (residences for the ministers) were erected at a cost of £250,000; and an equal or larger amount was expended on the building of 500 parochial schools, as well as a college in Edinburgh. After the passing of the Education (Scotland) Act 1872, most of these schools were voluntarily transferred to the newly established public school-boards.

Chalmers' ideas shaped the breakaway group. He stressed a social vision that revived and preserved Scotland's communal traditions at a time of strain on the social fabric of the country. Chalmers's idealised small equalitarian, kirk-based, self-contained communities that recognised the individuality of their members and the need for co-operation. That vision also affected the mainstream Presbyterian churches, and by the 1870s it had been assimilated by the established Church of Scotland. Chalmers's ideals demonstrated that the church was concerned with the problems of urban society, and they represented a real attempt to overcome the social fragmentation that took place in industrial towns and cities.

== Nature ==
=== Finances ===
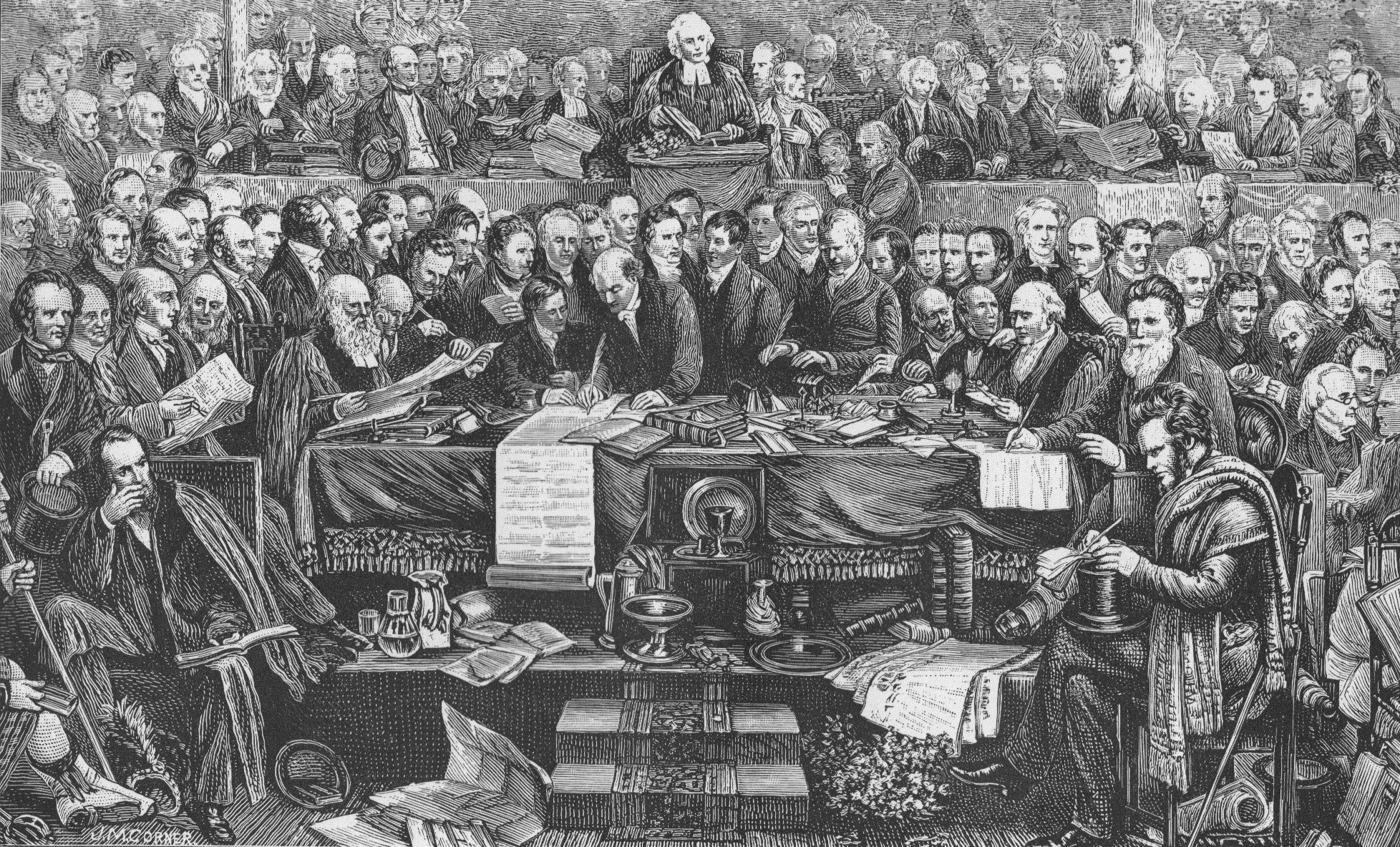
Signing The Deed of Demission Hugh Miller is at the end of the table taking notes leaning on his top hat. The central figure is Patrick MacFarlan with Chalmers in the chair behind.

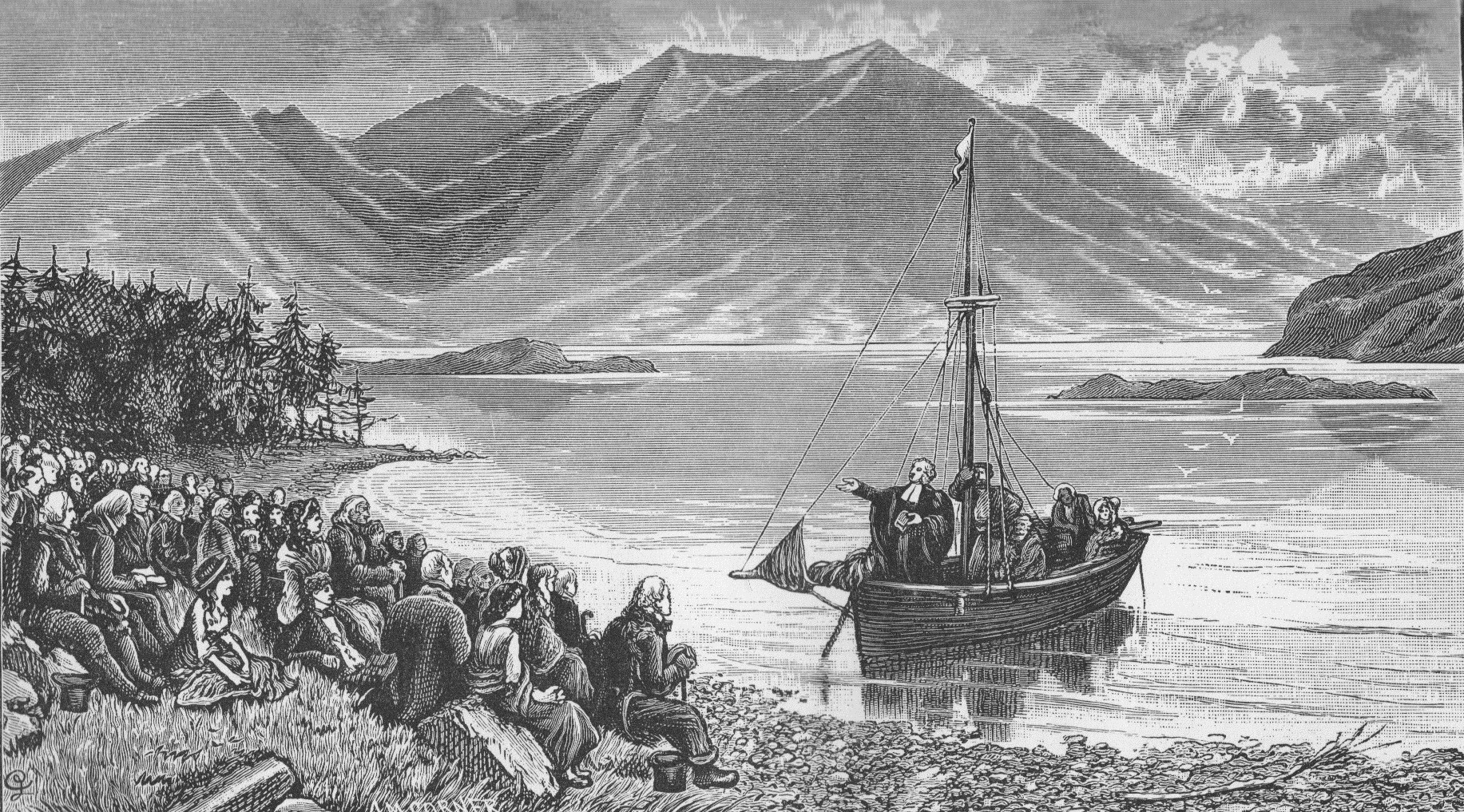
A minister of the Free Church preaching the Gospel in the 1840s.

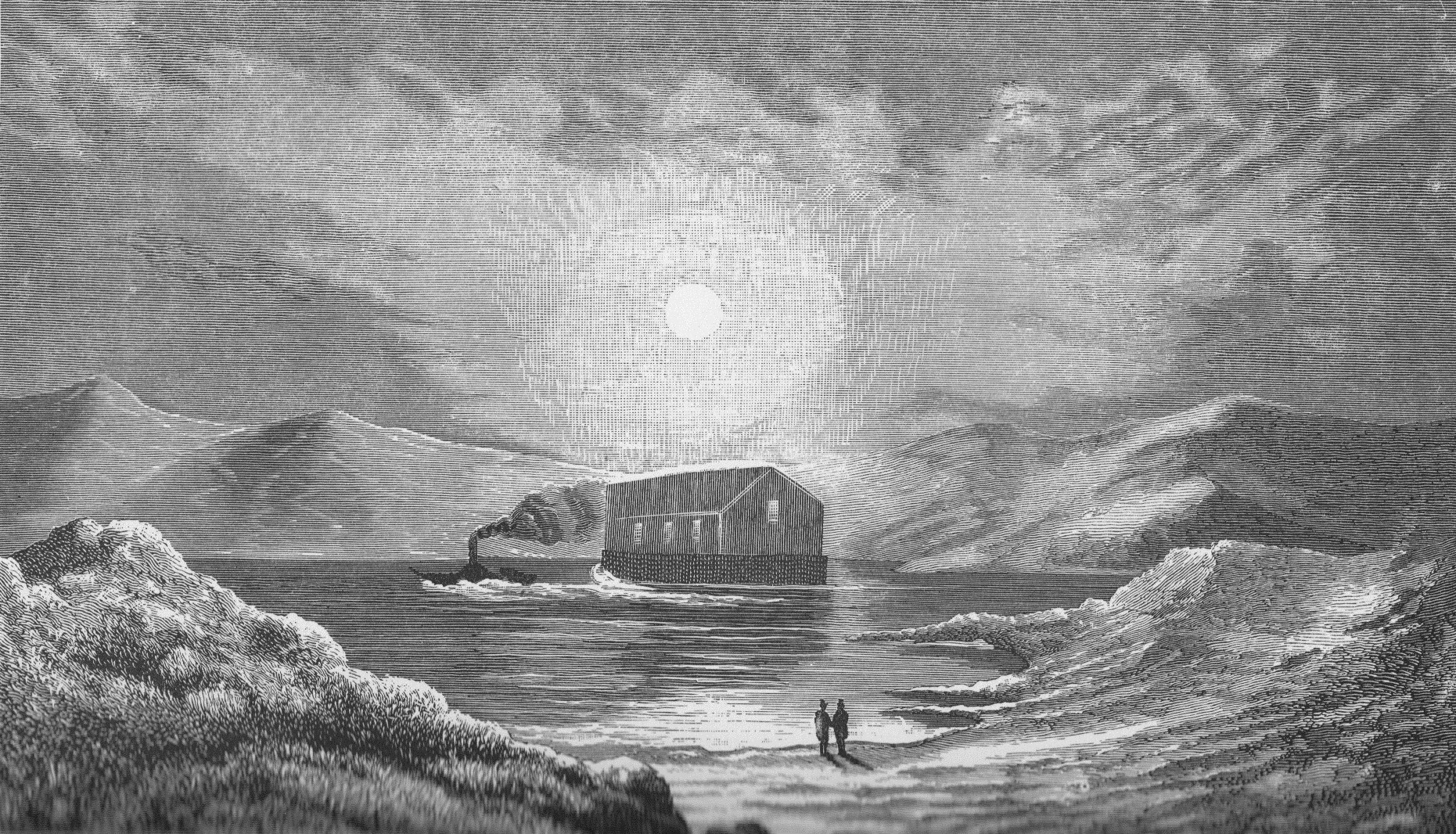
Towing Graham Speirs's Iron Church into Loch Sunart

The first task of the new church was to provide income for her initial 500 ministers and places of worship for her people. As she aspired to be the national church of the Scottish people, she set herself the ambitious task of establishing a presence in every parish in Scotland (except in the Highlands, where FC ministers were initially in short supply.) Sometimes land owners were less than helpful such as at Strontian, where the church took to a boat.

The building programme produced 470 new churches within a year and over 700 by 1847. Manses and over 700 schools soon followed. This programme was made possible by extraordinary financial generosity, which came from the Evangelical awakening and the wealth of the emerging middle class.

The church created a Sustentation Fund, the brainchild of Thomas Chalmers, to which congregations contributed according to their means, and from which all ministers received an 'equal dividend'. This fund provided a modest income for 583 ministers in 1843/4, and by 1900 was able to provide an income for nearly 1200. This centralising and sharing of resources was previously unknown within the Protestant churches in Scotland, but later became the norm.

=== "Send back the money" campaign ===
In their original fundraising activities the Free Church sent missionaries to the United States, where they found some slave-owners particularly supportive. However, the church having accepted £3,000 in donations from this source, they were later denounced as unchristian by some abolitionists. Some Free Churchmen like George Buchan, William Collins, John Wilson, and Henry Duncan themselves campaigned for the ultimate abolition of slavery. When Frederick Douglass arrived in Scotland he became a vocal proponent of a "send back the money" campaign which urged the Free Church to return the £3,000 in donations. In his autobiography, My Bondage and My Freedom, Douglass (p. 386) writes:

The Free Church held on to the blood-stained money, and continued to justify itself in its position – and of course to apologize for slavery – and does so till this day. She lost a glorious opportunity for giving her voice, her vote, and her example to the cause of humanity; and to-day she is staggering under the curse of the enslaved, whose blood is in her skirts.

Douglass spoke at three meetings in Dundee in 1846. In 1844, long before Douglass's arrival, Robert Smith Candlish had spoken against slavery in a debate about a man named John Brown. In 1847, he is quoted as saying, from the floor of the Free Church Assembly:

Never, never, let this church, or this country, cease to testify that slavery is sin, and that it must bring down on the sinners, whether they be in Congress assembled, or as individuals throughout the land, the just judgement of Almighty God.

Not all American Presbyterians shared his anti-slavery view, although some did both in the north and the south. Presbyterian thinker B. B. Warfield regarded the integration of freed slaves as one of the largest problems America had ever faced. An official letter from the Free Church did reach the Assembly of the Southern Presbyterian Church in May 1847. The official Free Church position was described as being "very strongly against slavery".

=== Theology ===
New College, Edinburgh from Princes Street Gardens

Great importance was attached to maintaining an educated ministry within the Free Church. Because the established Church of Scotland controlled the divinity faculties of the universities, the Free Church set up its own colleges. New College was opened in 1850 with five chairs: Systematic Theology, Apologetics and Practical Theology, Church History, Hebrew and Old Testament, and New Testament Exegesis. The Free Church also set up Christ's College in Aberdeen in 1856 and Trinity College in Glasgow followed later. The first generation of teachers were enthusiastic proponents of Westminster Calvinism.

For example, David Welsh was an early professor. James Buchanan followed Thomas Chalmers as professor of Systematic Theology when he died in 1847. James Bannerman was appointed to the chair of Apologetics and Pastoral Theology and his The Church of Christ volumes 1 and 2 were widely read. William Cunningham was one of the early Church History professors. John "Rabbi" Duncan was an early professor of Hebrew. Other chairs were added such as the Missionary Chair of Duff.

This position was subsequently abandoned, as theologians such as A. B. Bruce, Marcus Dods and George Adam Smith began to teach a more liberal understanding of the faith. 'Believing criticism' of the Bible was a central approach taught by such as William Robertson Smith and he was dismissed from his chair by the Assembly in 1881. Attempts were made between 1890 and 1895 to bring many of these professors to the bar of the Assembly on charges of heresy, but these moves failed, with only minor warnings being issued.

In 1892 the Free Church, following the example of the United Presbyterian Church and the Church of Scotland, and with union with those denominations as the goal, passed a Declaratory Act relaxing the standard of subscription to the confession. This had the result that a small number of congregations and even fewer ministers, mostly in the Highlands, severed their connection with the church and formed the Free Presbyterian Church of Scotland. Others with similar theological views waited for imminent union but chose to continue with the Free Church.

=== Activity ===
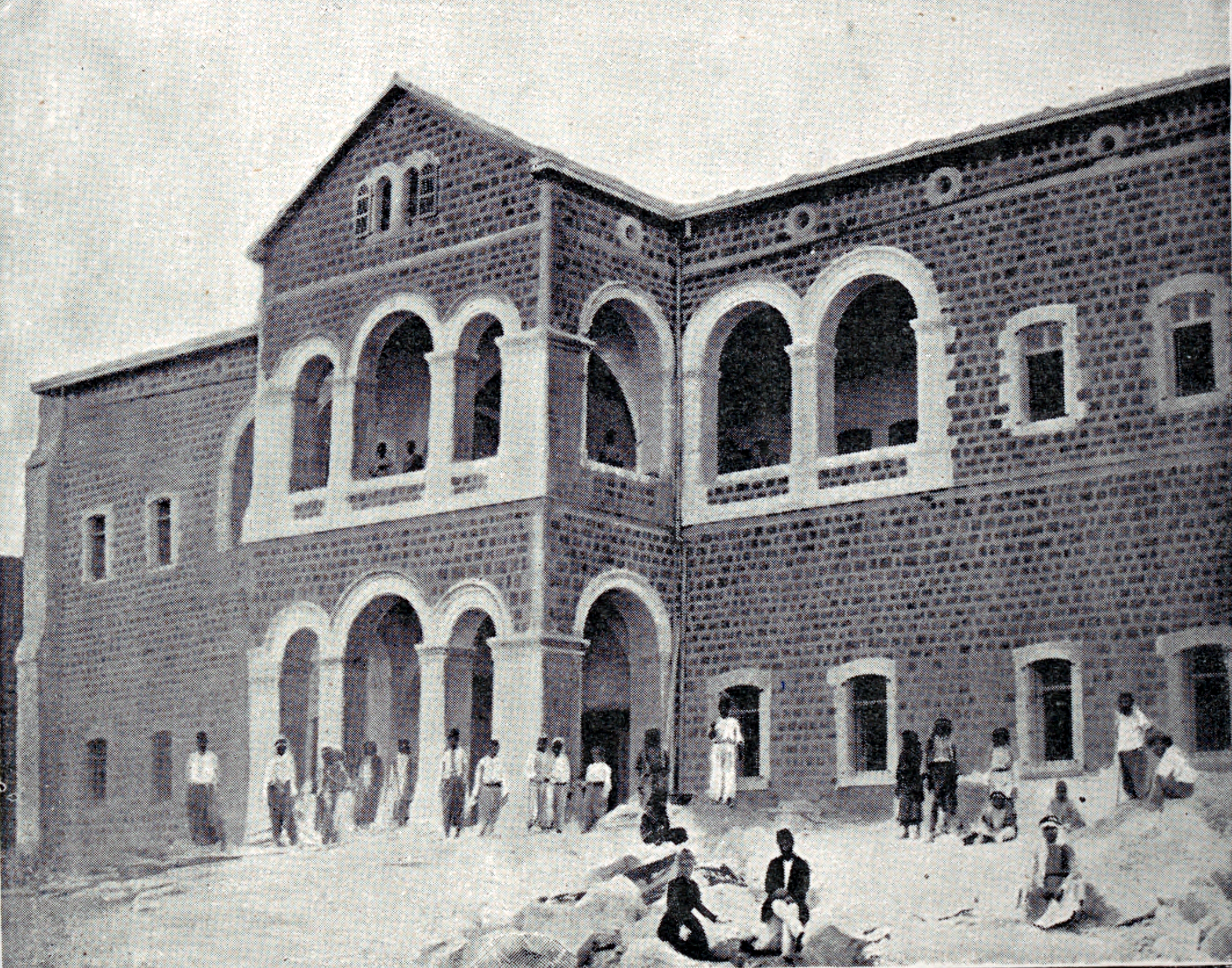
Sea of Galilee Hospital. Opened in 1893 following work which originated with Robert Murray M'Cheyne and Andrew Bonar.

The Free Church of Scotland became very active in foreign missions. Many of the staff from the established Church of Scotland's India mission adhered to the Free Church. The church soon also established herself in Africa, with missionaries such as James Stewart (1831–1905) and with the co-operation of Robert Laws (1851–1934) of the United Presbyterian Church, as well as becoming involved in evangelisation of the Jews. Her focus on mission resulted in one of the largest missionary organisations in the world. Preachers like William Chalmers Burns worked in Canada and China. Alexander Duff and John Anderson worked in India. Duff can be seen behind Hugh Miller in the Disruption Painting signing Missions in Bengal. There were missions related to the Free Church and visited by Duff at Lake Nyassa in Africa and in the Lebanon.

The early Free Church was also concerned with educational reform including setting up Free Church schools. Members of the Free Church also became associated with the colonisation of New Zealand: the Free Church offshoot the Otago Association sent out emigrants in 1847 who established the Otago settlement in 1848. Thomas Burns was one of the first churchmen in the colony which developed into Dunedin.

The importance of Home Missions also grew, these having the purpose of increasing church attendance, particularly amongst the poorer communities in large cities. Thomas Chalmers led the way with a territorial mission in Edinburgh's West Port (1844), which epitomised his idea of a "godly commonwealth". Free churchmen were at the forefront of the 1859 Revival as well as of the Moody and Sankey's campaign of 1873–1875 in Britain. However, Chalmers's social ideas were never fully realised, as the gap between the church and the urban masses continued to increase.

Towards the end of the 19th century, Free Churches sanctioned the use of instrumental music. An association formed in 1891 to promote order and reverence in public services. In 1898 it published A New Directory for Public Worship which, while not providing set forms of prayer, offered directions. The Free Church took an interest in hymnology and church music, which led to the production of its hymnbook.

== Unions and relationships with other Presbyterians ==
Timeline showing the evolution of the churches of Scotland from 1560

From its inception, the Free Church claimed it was the authentic Church of Scotland. Constitutionally, despite the Disruption, it continued to support the establishment principle. However some joined the United Presbyterian Church in calling for the disestablishment of the Church of Scotland.

In 1852, the Original Secession Church joined the Free Church; in 1876 most of the Reformed Presbyterian Church followed suit. However, a leadership-led attempt to unite with the United Presbyterians was not successful. These attempts began as early as 1863 when the Free Church began talks with the UPC with a view to a union. However, a report laid before the Assembly of 1864 showed that the two churches were not agreed as to the relationship between state and church. The Free Church maintained that national resources could be used in aid of the church, provided that the state abstain from all interference in its internal government. The United Presbyterians held that, as the state had no authority in spiritual things, it was not within its jurisdiction to legislate as to what was true in religion, prescribe a creed or any form of worship for its subjects, or to endow the church from national resources. Any union would therefore have to leave this question open. At the time this difference was sufficient to preclude the union being pursued.

In the following years, the Free Church Assembly showed increasing willingness for union on these open terms. However, the 'establishment' minority prevented a successful conclusion during the years between 1867 and 1873. After negotiations failed in 1873, the two churches agreed a 'Mutual Eligibility Act' enabling a congregation of one denomination to call a minister from the other.

During this period, the antidisestablishmentarian party continued to shrink and became increasingly alienated. This decline was hastened when some congregations left to form the Free Presbyterian Church of Scotland in 1893.

Starting in 1895, union began to be officially discussed once more. A joint committee made up of men from both denominations noted remarkable agreement on doctrinal standards, rules and methods. After a few concessions from both sides, a common constitution was agreed. However, a minority in the Free Church Assembly protested, and threatened to test its legality in the courts.

The respective assemblies of the churches met for the last time on 30 October 1900. On the following day, the union was completed, and the United Free Church of Scotland came into being.

However, a minority of those who dissented remained outside the union, claiming that they were the true Free Church and that the majority had departed from the church when they formed the United Free Church. After a protracted legal battle, the House of Lords found in favour of the minority (in spite of the belief of most that the true kirk is above the state) and awarded them the right to keep the name Free Church of Scotland, though the majority was able to keep most of the financial resources.

== Moderators of the General Assembly ==
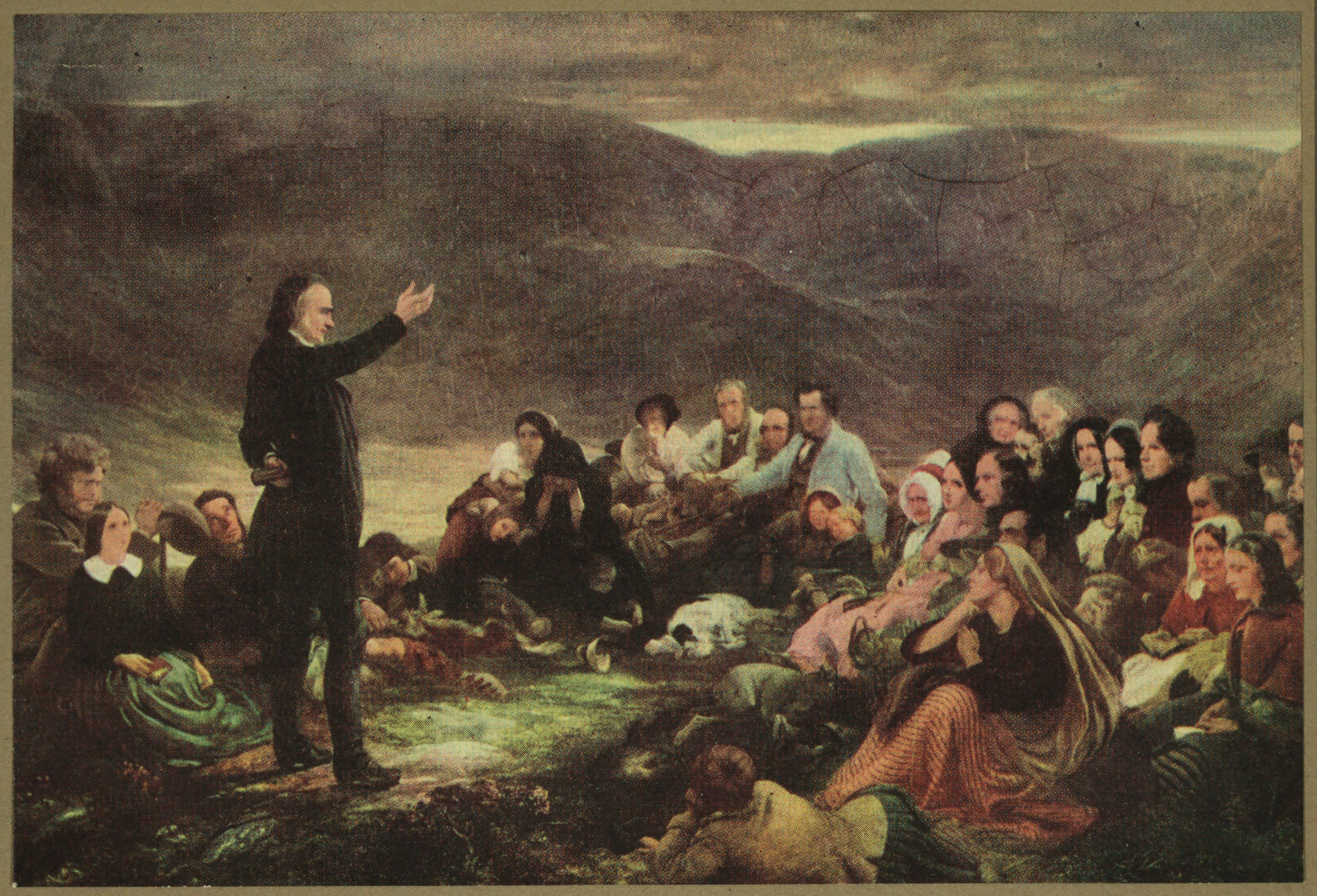
Book illustration of George Harvey's Dr. Guthrie preaching in the Glen

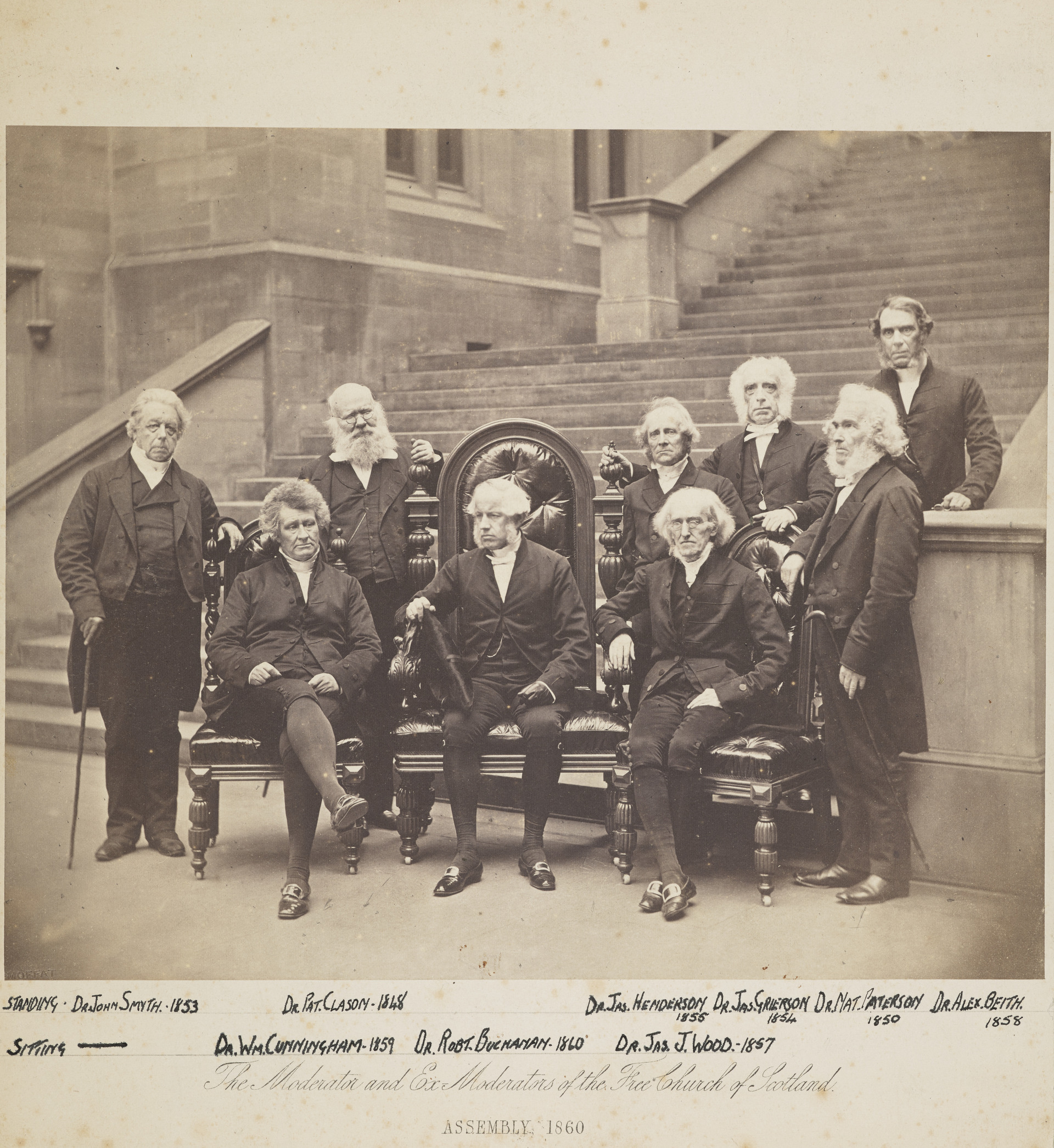
John Moffat's The Moderator and Ex Moderators of the Free Church of Scotland, Assembly 1860. This has been digitally colourised by Yusuf Tolga Ünker. Pictured, from left to right, are (standing) Dr Smyth, Dr Clason, Dr Henderson, Dr Grierson, Dr N. Paterson and Dr Beith (behind); (seated) Dr Cunningham, Dr Buchanan and Dr Julius Wood.

It is noted that duplicates appear in 1866 and 1867.

- Thomas Chalmers (May 1843)
- Thomas Brown (October 1843)
- Henry Grey (1844)
- Patrick MacFarlan (1845) Gaelic Moderator John Macdonald
- Robert James Brown (1846)
- James Sievewright (1847)
- Patrick Clason (1848)
- Mackintosh MacKay (1849)
- Nathaniel Paterson (1850)
- Alexander Duff (1851)
- Angus Makellar (1852)
- John Smyth (1853)
- James Grierson (1854)
- James Henderson (1855)
- Thomas M'Crie the Younger (1856)
- James Julius Wood (1857)
- Alexander Beith (1858)
- William Cunningham (1859)
- Robert Buchanan (1860)
- Robert Smith Candlish (1861)
- Thomas Guthrie (1862)
- Roderick McLeod (1863)
- Patrick Fairbairn (1864)
- James Begg (1865)
- William Wilson (1866)
- John Roxburgh (1866 or 1867)
- Robert Smith Candlish (1867)
- William Nixon (1868)
- Henry Wellwood Moncreiff (1869)
- John Wilson (1870)
- Robert Elder (1871)
- Charles John Brown (1872)
- Alexander Duff (1873) the only person to serve a second term
- Robert Walter Stewart (1874)
- Alexander Moody Stuart (1875)
- Thomas McLauchlan (1876)
- William Henry Goold (1877)
- Andrew Bonar (1878)
- James Chalmers Burns (1879)
- Thomas Main (1880)
- William Laughton (1881)
- Robert MacDonald (minister) (1882)
- Horatius Bonar (1883)
- Walter Ross Taylor (1884)
- David Brown (1885)
- Alexander Neil Somerville (1886)
- Robert Rainy (1887)
- Gustavus Aird (1888) (the only year the Assembly was solely in Inverness)
- John Laird (1889)
- Thomas Brown (1890)
- Thomas Smith (1891)
- William Garden Blaikie (1892)
- Walter Chalmers Smith (1893)
- George Douglas (1894)
- James Hood Wilson (1895)
- William Miller (1896)
- Hugh Macmillan (1897)
- Alexander Whyte (1898)
- James Stewart (1899)
- Walter Ross Taylor (1900)

== Gaelic Moderators ==
For certain years a separate Gaelic Moderator served at a separate Assembly in Inverness. This had advantages of allowing northern ministers to travel less to the Assembly. It did however create a division. In this division it was largely the northern ministers who remained in the Free Church following the Union of 1900. Known Gaelic Moderators are:

- Rev John MacDonald (1845)
- Gustavus Aird (1888)

== Other areas ==
The Free Church were spread the length and breadth of Scotland and also had churches in the northmost sectors of England and several churches in London. Their influence in other countries focused on Canada and New Zealand, where there were a high proportion of Scots. They ran a specific recruitment campaign to get Free Church ministers to go to New Zealand. Moderators in New Zealand included:

- Gordon Webster (1898)

Prince Edward Island, Canada, retains a number of Free Churches of Scotland affiliated with the Synod in Scotland as missionary churches. This alliance was established by the Moderator of the Free Church of Scotland, Rev. Ewen MacDougall, in the 1930s, at the time of the establishment of the Presbyterian Church in Canada and the subsequent establishment of the United Church of Canada. The large enclave of Free Church of Scotland congregations has been attributed to a religious revival under the preaching of Rev. Donald MacDonald. The extant Church of Scotland congregations of Prince Edward Island, Canada, continue to adhere to a simple form of worship with a focus on a biblical exegesis from the pulpit, singing of the Psalms and biblical paraphrases without accompaniment or choir, led by a chanter, and prayer. The houses of worship remain simple with minimal embellishment.

== Churches ==
- Abercorn (1843–1878, 1890–1900)
- Abercorn South Queensferry (1887–1890)
- Aberdeen Melville (1843–1900) – Originally an Original Burgher church that joined the Church of Scotland in 1839.
- Abington and Crawfordjohn (1866–1900)
- Airdrie Broomknoll/1st (1843–1900) – Originally an Original Burgher church that joined the Church of Scotland in 1839.
- Airdrie Graham Street/4th (1876–1900)
- Airdrie High/2nd (1843–1900)
- Airdrie West/3rd (1843–1900)
- Alexandria (1843–1900)
- Allanton (1843–1900)
- Alloa East (1843–1900) – Originally an Original Burgher church which joined the Church of Scotland in 1839.
- Ancrum (1859–1900)
- Annan (1843–1900)
- Appin (1859–1900)
- Appin and Ardchattan (1851–1859)
- Ardchattan (1843–1851, 1859–1900)
- Ardrishaig (1865–1900)
- Ardrossan (1845–1900)
- Armadale (1861–1900)
- Arrochar (1843–1900)
- Ashkirk (1843–1900)
- Auchencairn (1843–1900)
- Ayr and Wallacetown / Ayr 1st (1843–44)
- Ayr Martyrs'/4th (1876–1900)
- Ayr Newton-on-Ayr/2nd (1843–1900)
- Ayr St Andrew's/5th (1891–1900)
- Ayr Wallacetown/3rd (1854–1900)
- Ayr West/1st (1844–1900)
- Baillieston Mure Memorial (1875–1900)
- Baldernock (1843–1900)
- Ballantrae (1843–1900)
- Balmaghie (1855–1900)
- Barr (1843–1900)
- Barrhead (1843–1900)
- Barrhill (1849–1900)
- Bathgate (1843–1900)
- Bearsden (1888–1900)
- Beith (1843–1900)
- Belhaven (1843–1850)
- Bellshill (1874–1900)
- Bishopbriggs (1865–1900)
- Blackridge (1898–1900)
- Blantyre (1843–1900)
- Blantyre East/2nd (1889–1900)
- Bo'ness and Carriden (1844–1900)
- Bonhill (1847–1900)
- Borgue (1843–1900)
- Bothwell (1843–1900)
- Bothwell Park/2nd (1899–1900)
- Bowden (1843–1900)
- Bowling (1878–1900)
- Bowmore (1859–1900)
- Bridge of Weir (1843–1900) – Originally an Original Burgher church that joined the Church of Scotland in 1839.
- Broughton (1843–1900)
- Broxburn (1844–1900)
- Burrelton (1843–1900) – Originally an Original Burgher church that joined the Church of Scotland in 1839.
- Busby, formerly Carmunnock (1865–1900)
- Cairnryan (1844–1900)
- Caldercruix (1893–1900)
- Cambuslang (1856–1900)
- Cambusnethan (1854–1900)
- Camelon (1890–1900)
- Campbeltown (1843–1867)
- Campbeltown Lochend/1st (1867–1900)
- Campbeltown Lorne Street/2nd (1867–1900)
- Campsie (1862–1900)
- Canonbie (1843–1900)
- Cardross (1843–1900)
- Carlops (1860–1900)
- Carluke (1844–1900)
- Carnwath (1843–1900)
- Carradale and Skipness (1890–1900)
- Castle Douglas (1843–1900)
- Castle Douglas Macmillan/2nd (1876–1900)
- Cathcart (1865–1900)
- Cathcart New Cathcart/2nd (1899–1900)
- Catrine (1843–1900)
- Chapelhall (1857–1900)
- Chapelton (1843–1900)
- Chirnside (1876–1900)
- Chryston (1848–1900)
- Cleland (1879–1900)
- Closeburn (1843–1900)
- Clydebank Hamilton Memorial/1st (1885–1900)
- Clydebank West/2nd (1897–1900)
- Coalburn (1895–1900)
- Coatbridge East/2nd (1876–1900)
- Coatbridge Middle/1st (1843–1900)
- Coatbridge West/3rd (1877–1900)
- Coatbridge Whifflet/4th (1879–1900)
- Cockburnspath (1843–1900)
- Cockenzie (1843–1900)
- Cockpen (1843–1900)
- Coldstream (1845–1900)
- Colinton and Currie (1843–1880)
- Colmonell (1844–1900)
- Corsock (1867–1900)
- Corstorphine (1843–1900) – Became St Ninian's Parish Church and is still extant as of 2026.
- Craigneuk (1891–1900)
- Crailing (1843–1900)
- Cramond (1843–1900) – Became Davidson's Mains Parish Church.
- Creebridge (1843–1900)
- Crofthead (1870–1900) – Absorbed Longridge in 1870.
- Crossford (1870–1900)
- Crosshill (1856–1900)
- Culter (1843–1900)
- Cumbernauld (1843–1900) – Originally an Original Burgher church that joined the Church of Scotland in 1839.
- Cumbrae (1843–1900)
- Dailly (1843–1900)
- Dalbeattie (1843–1900)
- Dalkeith (1843–1900)
- Dalmellington (1845–1900)
- Dalry (1844–1900)
- Dalrymple (1861–1900)
- Dalton (1868–1900)
- Darvel (1876–1900)
- Denholm (1843–1900)
- Dirleton (1843–1900)
- Douglas (1845–1900)
- Douglas Water (1876–1900)
- Doune (1843–1871) – Originally an Original Burgher church that joined the Church of Scotland in 1839.
- Dumbarton High/1st (1843–1900)
- Dumbarton North/2nd (1874–1900)
- Dumfries Martyrs'/3rd (1876–1900)
- Dumfries St George's/1st (1843–1900)
- Dumfries South/2nd (1866–1900)
- Dunbar (1850–1900)
- Dundee Willison (1843–1900) – Originally an Original Burgher church that joined the Church of Scotland in 1839.
- Dundonald (1843–1900)
- Dunlop (1843–1900)
- Dunoon (1844–1900)
- Dunoon and Kilmun (1843–44)
- Dunoon Gaelic/2nd (1875–1900)
- Duns Boston (1843–1900)
- Dunscore (1843–1900)
- Dunscore Craig/2nd (1876–1900)
- Duntocher (1843–1900)
- Eaglesham (1876)
- East Kilbride (1843–1900)
- Ecclefechan (1845–1900)
- Eccles (1844–1900)
- Edinburgh Barclay/34th (1865–1900) – Became Barclay Parish Church.
- Edinburgh Buccleuch/1st (1843–1897)
- Edinburgh Buccleuch and Greyfriars/1st & 3rd (1897–1900) – Joined the continuing Free Church.
- Edinburgh Cowgate/30th (1859–1900) – Became Cowgate UFC and merged with College Street and Pleasance UFCs in 1910.
- Edinburgh Cowgatehead/31st (1859–1893) – Absorbed into St John's Free Church.
- Edinburgh Craigmillar Park/4th & 7th (1898–1900) – Became Craigmillar Park Parish Church.
- Edinburgh Dalry/42nd (1877–1900) – Became Dalry Parish Church.
- Edinburgh Davie Street/28th (1852–1858)
- Edinburgh Dean/2nd (1843–1900) – Became Dean UFC and merged with St Cuthbert's 1911.
- Edinburgh Fountainbridge/29th (1853–1900) – Became Candlish Parish Church (having relocated in 1901).
- Edinburgh Gorgie/47th (1891–1900) – Became North Merchiston Parish Church.
- Edinburgh Grange/35th (1865–1900) – aka Chalmers Memorial. Became St Catherine's in Grange Parish Church.
- Edinburgh Greyfriars/3rd (1843–1897)
- Edinburgh Guthrie Memorial/43rd (1881–1900) – Became Guthrie Memorial Parish Church and merged with St James's 1962.
- Edinburgh Henderson/4th (1843–1848)
- Edinburgh High/5th (1843–1900) – Became Reid Memorial Parish Church.
- Edinburgh Holyrood/27th (1849–1900) – United with Abbeyhill UFC in 1910.
- Edinburgh Knox's/10th (1851–1900) – United with Moray and Canongate to form Moray-Knox UFC in 1910.
- Edinburgh Lady Glenorchy's/6th (1843–1900) – Became Lady Glenorchy's North Parish Church and merged with Barony & St James's in 1956.
- Edinburgh Leith Wynd/7th (1843–1848) – Chapel of ease (founded 1792) that left wholesale at the Disruption. Merged with Henderson to form Tron 1848.
- Edinburgh Martyrs'/39th (1876–1900) – United with St John's UFC to form Martyrs' and St John's in 1909.
- Edinburgh Mayfield/40th (1876–1900) – Became Mayfield North Parish Church.
- Edinburgh McCrie/28th (1858–1886)
- Edinburgh McCrie Roxburgh/13th & 28th (1886–1900) – United with Newington UFC in 1920.
- Edinburgh Moray/33rd (1862–1900) – United with Knox's and Canongate to form Moray-Knox UFC in 1910.
- Edinburgh Morningside/8th (1843–1900) – Became Morningside High Parish Church.
- Edinburgh New North/9th (1843–1900) – Became New North Parish Church.
- Edinburgh New Street/10th (1843–1851)
- Edinburgh Newington/11th (1843–1900) – Became Newington East Parish Church.
- Edinburgh Parsons Green/46th (1890–1892)
- Edinburgh Pilrig/12th (1843–1900) – Became Pilrig Parish Church.
- Edinburgh Pleasance/32nd (1859–1900) – Merged with College Street and Cowgate UFCs 1910.
- Edinburgh Queen Street/21st & 25th (1891–1900) – Became Queen Street Parish Church and merged with St Andrew's in 1947.
- Edinburgh Restalrig/46th (1892–1900)
- Edinburgh Roseburn/36th (1866–1900)
- Edinburgh Roxburgh/13th (1843–1886)
- Edinburgh St Andrew's/14th (1843–1900)
- Edinburgh St Bernard's/15th (1843–1900)
- Edinburgh St Columba's/16th (1843–1900)
- Edinburgh St Cuthbert's/17th (1843–1900)
- Edinburgh St David's/18th (1843–1900)
- Edinburgh St George's/19th (1843–1900) – Became St George's West Parish Church and merged with St Andrew's in 2010.
- Edinburgh St James's/41st (1876–1900) – aka Granton & Wardie
- Edinburgh St John's/20th (1843–1893)
- Edinburgh St John's/20th & 31st (1893–1900)
- Edinburgh St Luke's/21st (1843–1891)
- Edinburgh St Mary's/22nd (1843–1900) – Became Barony Parish Church and merged with St James's Place (formerly UPC) in 1933.
- Edinburgh St Paul's/23rd (1843–1900) – Chapel of ease (founded 1836) that left wholesale at the Disruption.
- Edinburgh St Stephen's/24th (1843–1900)
- Edinburgh South Morningside/45th (1889–1900)
- Edinburgh Stockbridge/37th (1868–1900)
- Edinburgh Tolbooth/25th (1843–1891)
- Edinburgh Tron/4th & 7th (1848–1898)
- Edinburgh Viewforth/38th (1872–1900)
- Edinburgh Warrender Park/44th (1886–1900)
- Edinburgh West Port/26th (1847–1900) – aka Chalmers' Territorial. Became Chalmers Parish Church.
- Elderslie (1897–1900)
- Ellsridgehill (1845–1900)
- Erskine (1843–1900)
- Eskdalemuir (1876–1900)
- Ettrick (1880–1900)
- Eyemouth St John's (1843–1900)
- Fairlie (1843–1900)
- Falkirk (1843–1900) – Originally an Original Burgher congregation that joined the Church of Scotland in 1839.
- Falkirk Bainsford/2nd (1878–1900)
- Fenwick (1844–1900)
- Forth and Wllsontown (1870–1900)
- Galashiels (1843–1900)
- Galston (1844–1900)
- Garelochhead (1873–1900)
- Garvald (1843–1900)
- Gilmerton (1843–1856)
- Girthon and Anwoth (1843–1900)
- Girvan (1843–1900)
- Girvan West/2nd (1876–1879)
- Glasgow Anderston/1st (1843–1900)
- Glasgow Augustine/54th (1872–1900)
- Glasgow Barony/47th (1867–1900)
- Glasgow Barrowfield/63rd (1876–1900)
- Glasgow Blochairn/60th (1875–1900)
- Glasgow Bridgegate/40th (1860–1900)
- Glasgow Bridgeton/2nd (1843–1900)
- Glasgow Broomielaw/42nd (1862–1885)
- Glasgow Buchanan Memorial/64th (1876–1900)
- Glasgow Camlachie/3rd (1843–1879) – Renamed Whitevale.
- Glasgow Candlish Memorial/56th (1874–1900)
- Glasgow Chalmers/38th (1859–1900)
- Glasgow College/36th (1857–1900)
- Glasgow Cowcaddens/48th (1867–1900)
- Glasgow Cranstonhill/65th (1876–1900)
- Glasgow Cuninghame/55th (1873–1900)
- Glasgow Dennistoun/50th (1868–1900)
- Glasgow Duke Street Gaelic/30th (1845–1900)
- Glasgow East Campbell Street/31st (1852–1900)
- Glasgow East Gorbals/32nd (1853–1864) – Renamed Victoria.
- Glasgow East Park/72nd (1877–1900)
- Glasgow Fairbairn/61st (1875–1900)
- Glasgow Finnieston/35th (1856–1900)
- Glasgow Gaelic?/4th (1843–1893) – Renamed Tradeston.
- Glasgow Gorbals/5th (1843–1900)
- Glasgow Great Hamilton Street/66th (1876–1900)
- Glasgow Hope Street/6th (1843–1900)
- Glasgow Hutchesontown/7th (1843–1900)
- Glasgow John Knox/8th (1843–1900) – Quoad sacra parish that left wholesale at the Disruption.
- Glasgow Kelvinside/41st (1860–1900)
- Glasgow Keppochhill/76th (1888–1895) – Renamed Somerville Memorial.
- Glasgow Kingston/9th (1843–1884) – Dissolved.
- Glasgow Kinning Park/43rd (1862–1900)
- Glasgow Langside/74th (1884–1900)
- Glasgow Laurieston/10th (1843–1851) – Renamed Union.
- Glasgow London Road/57th (1874–1900)
- Glasgow Lyon Street/52nd (1870–1900)
- Glasgow Macdonald/45th (1863–1900)
- Glasgow Maitland/44th (1862–1873) – Joined the Church of Scotland in 1873.
- Glasgow Martyrs'/11th (1843–1900)
- Glasgow Maryhill/12th (1843–1900)
- Glasgow Millerston/39th (1859–1900)
- Glasgow Milton/13th (1843–1900) – Joined the continuing Free Church.
- Glasgow North Woodside/67th (1876–1900)
- Glasgow Paisley Road/58th (1874–1900)
- Glasgow Plantation/75th (1884–1890s) – Renamed White Memorial.
- Glasgow Pollokshields/68th (1876–1900)
- Glasgow Possilpark/73rd (1881–1900)
- Glasgow Queen's Cross/79th (1897–1900)
- Glasgow Queen's Park/49th (1867–1900)
- Glasgow Renfield/14th (1843–1900) – Originally an Original Burgher church that joined the Church of Scotland in 1839.
- Glasgow Renwick/69th (1876–1900)
- Glasgow Rose Street/62nd (1875–1900)
- Glasgow St Andrew's/15th (1843–1891) – United with St Paul's.
- Glasgow St Andrew's (II)/82nd (1899–1900)
- Glasgow St David's/16th (1843–1900)
- Glasgow St Enoch's/17th (1843–1900)
- Glasgow St George's/18th (1843–1900)
- Glasgow St George's Road/70th (1876–1900)
- Glasgow St James's/19th (1843–1900)
- Glasgow St John's/20th (1843–1900)
- Glasgow St Luke's/21st (1843–1900)
- Glasgow St Mark's/22nd (1843–1900)
- Glasgow St Matthew's/23rd (1843–1900)
- Glasgow St Paul's/24th (1843–1891)
- Glasgow St Paul's/15th & 24th (1891–1900)
- Glasgow St Peter's/25th (1843–1900)
- Glasgow St Stephen's/26th (1843–1900)
- Glasgow Shawlands/81st (1898–1900)
- Glasgow Sherbrooke/78th (1894–1900)
- Glasgow Sighthill/53rd (1871–1900)
- Glasgow Somerville Memorial/76th (1895–1900)
- Glasgow Springburn/77th (1888–1900)
- Glasgow Stevenson Memorial/80th (1897–1900)
- Glasgow Stockwell/27th (1843–1900) – Formed 1839 as a Church of Scotland church, offshoot of an Original Burgher church.
- Glasgow Tollcross/51st (1869–1900)
- Glasgow Tradeston/4th (1893–1900)
- Glasgow Trinity/46th (1864–1900)
- Glasgow Tron/28th (1843–1900)
- Glasgow Union/10th (1851–1900)
- Glasgow Victoria/32nd (1864–1900)
- Glasgow Wellpark/29th (1843–1900)
- Glasgow West/33rd (1854–1900)
- Glasgow West Scotland Street/83rd (1900)
- Glasgow Westbourne/71st (1876–1900)
- Glasgow White Memorial/75th (1890s-1900)
- Glasgow Whiteinch/59th (1874–1900)
- Glasgow Whitevale/3rd (1879–1900)
- Glasgow Wynd/34th (1854–1900)
- Glasgow Young Street/37th (1858–1900)
- Glenboig (1889–1900)
- Glencairn (1843–1900)
- Glencaple (1862–1900)
- Glenkens (1846–1900)
- Glenluce (1847–1900)
- Glenorchy (1843–1900)
- Gordon (1843–1900)
- Gorebridge (1861–1900)
- Gourock (1843–1900)
- Govan (1844–1873)
- Govan Linthouse/4th (1900)
- Govan St Columba's/3rd (1874–1900)
- Govan St Mary's/2nd (1872–1900)
- Govan Summerton/1st (1873–1900)
- Grangemouth (1843–1884) – Quoad sacra parish that left wholesale at the Disruption.
- Grangemouth Charing Cross/1st (1884–1900)
- Grangemouth West/2nd (1884–1900)
- Grantshouse (1888–1900)
- Greengairs (1874–1900)
- Greenlaw (1843–1900) – Originally an Original Burgher church that joined the Church of Scotland in 1839.
- Greenock Cartsdyke/1st (1843–1853) – Originally an Original Burgher church that joined the Church of Scotland in 1839.
- Greenock Crawfurdsburn/7th (1862–1900)
- Greenock Gaelic/2nd (1843–1900)
- Greenock Martyrs'/10th (1876–1900)
- Greenock Middle/3rd (1843–1900)
- Greenock Mount Park/9th (1874–1900)
- Greenock North/8th (1864–1900)
- Greenock St Andrew's/4th (1843–1900)
- Greenock St Thomas's/5th (1843–1900)
- Greenock Well Park/1st (1853–1900)
- Greenock West/6th (1843–1900)
- Haddington Knox's/2nd (1852–1872)
- Haddington St John's (1843–1900)
- Half Morton (1843–1849)
- Half Morton and Gretna (1849–1900)
- Hamilton Burnbank/2nd (1875–1881)
- Hamilton Low Waters/3rd (1897–1900)
- Hamilton St John's/1st (1843–1900)
- Hamilton West/2nd (1881–1900)
- Harthill (1874–1900)
- Hawick (1843–1900)
- Hawick St Andrew's/2nd (1867–1900)
- Hawick West Port/3rd (1869–1900)
- Helensburgh Park/2nd (1861–1900)
- Helensburgh West/1st (1843–1900) – Originally an Original Burgher church that joined the Church of Scotland in 1839.
- Hightae (1876–1900)
- Holytown (1843–1900)
- Houndwood (1845–1888)
- Houston (1843–1900)
- Humbie (1843–1900)
- Hurlford (1856–1900)
- Inch (1844–1900)
- Inchinnan (1843–1900)
- Innellan (1855–1900)
- Innerleithen (1843–1900)
- Innerwick (1843–1900)
- Inveraray (1843–1900)
- Inverkip (1843–1900)
- Irongray (1843–1900)
- Irvine Fullarton (1843–1900)
- Irvine (1849–1900)
- Isle of Whithorn (1843–1900)
- Jedburgh (1843–1900)
- Johnstone (1843–1900)
- Johnstone and Wamphray (1844–1900)
- Jordanhill Hillhead (1855–1900)
- Juniper Green (1880–1900) – Became St Andrew's Parish Church and united with the Established Church 1974.
- Kelso East/2nd (1883–1900)
- Kelso North (1843–1900)
- Kilberry and South Knapdale (1862–1900)
- Kilbirnie (1844–1876)
- Kilbirnie East/1st (1876–1900)
- Kilbirnie West/2nd (1876–1900)
- Kilbrandon and Kilchattan (1843–1900)
- Kilbride (Isle of Arran) (1843–1900)
- Kilcalmonell (1870–1900)
- Kilchattan Bay (1899–1900)
- Kilchoman (1843–1900)
- Kildalton and Oa (1843–1900)
- Kilfinnan (1843–1900)
- Killarrow and Kilmeny (1843–1900)
- Killean (1843–1900)
- Killearn (1845–1900)
- Kilmacolm (1881–1900)
- Kilmarnock Braehead/6th (1883–1900)
- Kilmarnock Grange/5th (1877–1900)
- Kilmarnock Henderson/1st (1843–1900) – Originally an Original Burgher church that joined the Church of Scotland in 1839.
- Kilmarnock High/2nd (1843–1900)
- Kilmarnock Martyrs'/4th (1876–1900)
- Kilmarnock St Andrew's/3rd (1843–1900)
- Kilmartin (1857–1900)
- Kilmaurs (1844–1900)
- Kilmodan (1843–44)
- Kilmodan and Southhall (1844–1900)
- Kilmory (1843–1900)
- Kilmun (1844–1900)
- Kilsyth (1843–1900)
- Kilwinning (1845–1900)
- Kingarth (1843–1900)
- Kingarth South (1868–1899) – Renamed Kilchattan Bay.
- Kirkbean and Southwick (1844–1900)
- Kirkcolm (1845–1900)
- Kirkcudbright (1843–1900)
- Kirkintilloch Marshall/2nd (1855–1873)
- Kirkintilloch St Andrew's/2nd (1873–1900)
- Kirkintilloch St David's/1st (1843–1900)
- Kirkliston (1843–1900)
- Kirkmahoe (1844–1900)
- Kirkmaiden (1843–1900)
- Kirkmichael (1872–1885)
- Kirkoswald (1860–1900)
- Kirkpatrick Durham (1843–1900)
- Kirkpatrick Fleming (1843–1900)
- Kirkurd (1843–1900)
- Ladhope (1843–1900)
- Lamlash (1896–1900)
- Lanark (1843–1900)
- Langholm (1843–1900)
- Langton (1843–1900)
- Largs (1843–1900)
- Larkhall (1860–1900)
- Lauder (1843–1900)
- Laurieston (1876–1900)
- Law (1883–1900)
- Leadhills (1883–1900)
- Leith Elder Memorial/5th (1898–1900) – Building went to the continuing Free Church; congregation united with St John's 1907.
- Leith Junction Street/5th (1852–1863)
- Leith Mariners'/1st (1843–1867) – Chapel of ease (founded 1839) that left wholesale at the Disruption.
- Leith North/2nd (1843–1900) – Became Leith North Ferry Road UFC, then Leith St Nicholas Parish Church.
- Leith St John's/3rd (1843–1900) – Became St John's West Parish Church.
- Leith St Ninian's/1st (1867–1900) – Became St Ninian's Parish Church.
- Leith South/4th (1843–1900) – Became Leith Claremont Parish Church.
- Leith Trinity/5th (1863–1898)
- Lenimore and Pirnmill (1886–1900)
- Lesmahagow (1843–1900)
- Leswalt (1843–1900)
- Liberton (1856–1900) – Became Northfield Parish Church.
- Linlithgow (1843–1900)
- Livingston (1843–1900)
- Loanhead (1858–1900)
- Lochend and New Abbey (1863–1900)
- Lochfyneside (1844–1900)
- Lochgilphead (1843–1900)
- Lochgilphead Martyrs'/2nd (1876–1900)
- Lochgoilhead (1883–1900)
- Lochmaben (1843–1900)
- Lochranza (1844–1900)
- Lochwinnoch (1843–1900)
- Lockerbie (1843–1900)
- Longformacus (1870–1900)
- Longridge (1852–1870) – Merged into Crofthead 1870.
- Longriggend (1888–1900)
- Loudoun (1846–1900)
- Luss (1844–1900)
- Makerstoun (1847–1900)
- Mauchline (1843–1900)
- Maxwelltown (1843–1900)
- Maybole (1843–1900)
- Melrose (1843–1900)
- Midmar (1843–1900) – Originally an Original Burgher church that joined the Church of Scotland in 1839.
- Moffat (1843–1900)
- Mordington (1843–1900)
- Morebattle (1845–1900)
- Motherwell Clason Memorial/2nd (1892–1900)
- Motherwell Dalziel/1st (1843–1900)
- Muirkirk (1845–1900)
- Musselburgh (1843–1900)
- Neilston (1873–1900)
- Nenthorn (1843–1900)
- New Cumnock (1843–1900)
- New Cumnock Afton/2nd (1876–1900)
- New Cumnock Bank/3rd (1877–1900)
- Newbattle (1884–1900)
- Newcastleton (1856–1900)
- Newhaven (1843–1900) – Became Newhaven St Andrew's Parish Church and united with Newhaven 1974.
- Newton Stewart (1876–1900)
- Nitshill (1879–1900)
- North and South Knapdale (1845–1854)
- North Berwick (1843–1900)
- North Bute (1843–1900)
- North Knapdale (1854–1900)
- Ochiltree (1843–1900)
- Old Cumnock (1843–1900)
- Old Kilpatrick (1843–1900)
- Ormiston (1843–66, 1875-1900)
- Ormiston and Pathhead (1866–1874)
- Orwell (1843–1900) – Originally an Original Burgher church that joined the Church of Scotland in 1839.
- Paisley Gaelic/1st (1843–1900)
- Paisley High/2nd (1843–1900)
- Paisley Martyrs'/3rd (1843–1900) – Originally an Original Burgher church that joined the Church of Scotland in 1839.
- Paisley Middle/4th (1843–1900)
- Paisley Oakshaw/7th (1876–1900)
- Paisley St George's/5th (1843–1900)
- Paisley Sherwood/8th (1889–1900)
- Paisley South/6th (1843–1900)
- Partick Anderson/1st (1843–1900)
- Partick Broomhill/5th (1899–1900)
- Partick Dowanvale/3rd (1878–1900)
- Partick Gaelic/4th (1887–1900)
- Partick High/2nd (1866–1900)
- Pathhead (1843–1861)
- Peebles (1843–1900)
- Pencaitland (1843–1882, 1891-1900)
- Penicuik (1843–1900)
- Penpont (1843–1900)
- Penpont West/2nd (1876–1900)
- Perceton and Dreghorn (1843–1900)
- Perth Kinnoul Street (1843–1870) – Originally an Original Burgher church that joined the Church of Scotland in 1839.
- Pollokshaws (1844–1849)
- Pollokshaws East/2nd (1849–1900)
- Pollokshaws West/1st (1849–1900)
- Polmont (1843–1900)
- Port Glasgow Hamilton/1st (1843–1900)
- Port Glasgow Newark/2nd (1876–1900)
- Port Glasgow West/3rd (1878–1900)
- Port William (1872–1900)
- Portnahaven (1875–1900)
- Portobello (St Philip's) (1843–1900) – Became Portobello St Philip's Parish Church.
- Portpatrick (1843–1900)
- Prestonkirk (1843–1900)
- Prestonpans (1843–1900)
- Prestwick (1843–1900)
- Ratho and Kirknewton (1844–1900) – Became Wilkieston Parish Church.
- Renfrew (1843–1900)
- Renton Gaelic/2nd (1859–1900)
- Renton Levenside/3rd (1876–1900) – Originally Original Burgher, joining the RPs in 1842.
- Renton Millburn/1st (1846–1900)
- Reston (1881–1900)
- Roberton (1845–1852)
- Roseneath (1843–1900)
- Roslin (1843–1900)
- Rothesay Free Parish/1st (1843–1900)
- Rothesay Gaelic/Chapelhall/2nd (1843–1900)
- Rothesay West/3rd (1843–1900)
- Rutherglen (1843–1900)
- Rutherglen East/2nd (1876–1900)
- Ruthwell (1843–1900)
- St Abbs (1895–1900)
- St Boswells (1843–1900)
- Saltcoats Landsborough/1st (1843–1900)
- Saltcoats Gaelic/2nd (1843–1852, 1868-1900)
- Saltoun and Bolton (1843–1900)
- Sandbank (1867–1900)
- Sanquhar (1843–1900)
- Selkirk (1843–1900)
- Shandon (1843–1900)
- Shettleston (1843–44, 1876-1900)
- Shettleston Carntyne/2nd (1890–1900)
- Sheuchan (1843–1900)
- Shieldhill (1890–1900)
- Shiskine (1844–1900)
- Shotts (1848–1900)
- Skirling (1843–1900)
- Slamannan (1845–1900)
- Sorbie (1843–1900)
- Sprouston (1843–1883)
- Stair (1843–1900)
- Stevenston (1846–1900)
- Stewarton (1843–1900) – Originally an Original Burgher church that joined the Church of Scotland in 1839.
- Stonehouse (1843–1900)
- Stoneykirk (1843–1900)
- Stow and Heriot (1845–1900)
- Strachur and Strathlachlan (1843–1900)
- Stranraer (1843–1900)
- Strathaven (1843–1900)
- Strathblane (1870–1900)
- Strathkinness (1843–1900) – Originally an Original Burgher church that joined the Church of Scotland in 1839.
- Swinton (1843–1900)
- Symington (1843–1900)
- Tarbert (1843–1900)
- Tarbolton (1861–1900)
- Temple and Carrington (1843–1900)
- Tighnabruaich (1877–1900)
- Tongland and Twynholm (1844–1900)
- Torphichen (1843–1900)
- Tranent (1843–1900)
- Troon (1843–1900)
- Uddingston (1876–1900)
- Uphall (1898–1900)
- Wanlockhead (1843–1900)
- West Calder (1868–1900)
- West Kilbride (1843–1900)
- Westruther (1843–1900)
- Whitburn (1852–1900)
- Whithorn (1843–1900)
- Whiting Bay (1875–1900)
- Wigtown (1843–1900)
- Wishaw (1873–1900)
- Wolflee (1845–1900)
- Yarrow and Megget (1845–1900)
- Yester (1843–1900)
- Yetholm (1852–1900)

== Original Secession churches that joined the Free Church in 1852 ==
OSC name	Free Church name	Notes
Arbroath Maule St (maj.)	Arbroath High Street	Became Arbroath High St UFC. U/w East 1924 to form Arb. St Ninian's UFC.
Balmullo (majority)	Balmullo	Seems to have disappeared about 1859.
Birsay (small part)	Birsay	Suppressed 1854.
Brechin: South Port	Brechin: South	(1820 split from Brechin Antiburgher.) Suppressed 1854, most of congregation joined Brechin UPC.
Carnoustie	Carno: 2nd Charge	Left for RPC 1860, rejoined OSC in 1876 (see below).
Clola		Clola UFC 1900. Deer Clola PC 1929. U/w Deer and Ardallie 1975 to form Deer Parish Church.
Colmonell (part)	Colmonell	Became Colmonell UFC. Status reduced 1927.
Dollar		Absorbed into Dollar and Muckhart Free Church 1852.
Dundee: Meadowfield		Absorbed into Dundee Dudhope Free Church 1853.
Edinburgh: Davie St		McCrie FC 1858. United with Roxburgh Free Church 1886 to form McCrie-Roxburgh Free Church.
Greenlaw		Merged with Greenlaw Free Church in 1856.
Haddington	Haddington: Knox's	Absorbed into Haddington St John's Free Church 1871.
Kirkcaldy: Linktown	Kirkcaldy: Dunnikier	UFC 1900. Parish Church 1929. U/w Victoria Road to form Kirkcaldy St Andrew's PC 1972.
Kirkwall		Absorbed into Kirkwall Free Church 1853.
Leith: Junction St		(OSC 1848.) Leith Trinity FC 1863. L. Elder Mem. FC 1899. Absorbed into Leith St John's UFC 1907.
Longridge		Moved to Crofthead 1870. Fauldhouse UFC 1900. Fa Cr PC 1929. U/w Fa PC 1973 → Fa St And's.
Thurso (part)	Thurso: West	UFC 1900. Parish Church 1929. Merged into North Coast and the Flows Parish Church 2025.
Whitburn		UFC 1900. Whitburn Brucefield PC 1929. U/w Blackburn 2000? → Wh. Burnfield Valley North PC.
Yetholm		Yetholm St James' UFC 1900. United with Yetholm Border View UFC 1914 to form Yetholm UFC.

== Reformed Presbyterian churches that joined the Free Church in 1876 ==
RPC name	Free Church name	Subsequent history
Airdrie	Airdrie: Graham Street	UFC 1900. Airdrie Graham Street Parish Church 1929. Dissolved 1954.
Ayr	Ayr: Martyrs'	UFC 1900. United with St John's UFC 1904 to form Ayr Wallacetown UFC.
Castle Douglas	Castle Doug: Macmillan	Castle Douglas Queen St UFC 1900. U/w Trinity & St George's 1923 to form Castle Doug. UFC.
Chirnside		Chirnside West UFC 1900. United with Erskine UFC to form Chirnside UFC 1919.
Coatbridge	Coatbridge: East	UFC 1900. Coatb. Maxwell PC 1929. U/w Dunbeth & Gartsherrie 1993 --> Co. St Andrew's PC.
Kilmarnock	Kilmarnock: Martyrs'	UFC 1900. Kilmarnock Martyrs' Parish Church 1929. Dissolved 1958.
Darvel		Darvel Easton Mem. UFC 1900. PC 1929. U/w Irvine Bank to form Darvel IB & EM PC 1956.
Douglas Water		UFC 1900. Rigside PC 1929. U/w Douglas Water --> Douglas W. and Rigside Parish Church 1959.
Dundee	Dundee: Martyrs'	UFC 1900. PC 1929. U/w Balgay St Thomas's 1973 to form Dundee Balgay Parish Church.
Dunscore	Dunscore: Craig	UFC 1900. Parish Church 1929. Joined United Free Church (Continuing) 1933. Closed 1950s.
Edinburgh	Edinburgh: Martyrs'	UFC 1900. United with St John's 1909 to form Edinburgh Martyrs' and St John's UFC.
Eskdalemuir & Ettrick	Eskdalemuir	UFC 1900. Reduced to a preaching station 1912.
Girvan	Girvan: West	Reduced to a preaching station under Girvan Free Church 1879.
Glasgow: Landressy St	Glasgow: Barrowfield	UFC 1900. Gl. Ba. Edgar Mem. PC 1929. U/w Bridgeton West --> Gl. Br. West & Ba. PC 1932.
Glasgow: Renwick		UFC 1900. Parish Church 1929. U/w Laurieston to form Glasgow Laurieston-Renwick PC 1941.
Glasgow: St George's Road		Gl. Grant Street UPC 1900. PC 1929. U/w Shamrock St to form Glasgow Garnethill PC 1930.
Greenock: W. Shaw St	Greenock: Martyrs'	UFC 1900. United with Greenock North to form Greenock Martyrs' & North UFC 1924.
Hightae		UFC 1900. United with Dalton to form Dalton and Hightae UFC 1904.
Kilbirnie	Kilbirnie: West	UFC 1900. PC 1929. U/w Kilbirnie East to form Kilbirnie St Columba's Parish Church 1964.
Port Glasgow	Port Gl: Newark	UFC 1900. Absorbed into Port Glasgow West UFC 1905.
Laurieston		Falkirk Laurieston West UFC 1900. PC 1929. U/w Lau. St Columba's --> Fal. Lau. PC 1945.
Lochgilphead	Lochgilph: Martyrs'	UFC 1900. Absorbed into Lochgilphead UFC 1905.
New Cumnock	New Cumnock: Afton	UFC 1900. United with Arthur Memorial to form New Cumnock UFC 1918.
Newton Stewart		Newton Stewart Rutherford UFC 1900. U/w Creebridge 1909 to form Newton Stewart Trinity UFC.
Paisley	Paisley: Oakshaw	Paisley Oakshaw West UFC 1900. PC 1929. U/w South to form Paisley St Luke's PC 1972.
Penpont	Penpont: West	UFC 1900. United with Burnhead 1911 to form Scaurbridge and Burnhead UFC.
Dumfries	Dumfries: Martyrs'	UFC 1900. Dissolved 1924.
Renton	Renton: Levenside	UFC 1900. United with South to form Renton Levenside and South UPC 1910.
Rutherglen	Rutherglen: East	UFC 1900. Parish Church 1929. Absorbed into Rutherglen Old Parish Church 1981.
Glasgow: Great Hamilton Street		UFC 1900. Glasgow Macmillan PC 1929. U/w Calton Relief --> Gl. Macmillan-Calton PC 1949.
Stirling	Stirling: Craigs	UFC 1900. United with North to form Stirling North and Craigs UFC 1909.
Strathmiglo	Strathmiglo: North	United with South to form Strathmiglo Free Church 1899.
Wick	Wick: Martyrs'	UFC 1900. Absorbed into Pulteneytown Central UFC 1911.

== Churches formed by unions between other Free Churches ==
Church	Formed	From
Edinburgh: Buccleuch-Greyfriars	1897	Buccleuch and Greyfriars
Edinburgh: McCrie-Roxburgh	1886	McCrie and Roxburgh
Edinburgh: Queen Street	1891	St Luke's and Tolbooth
Strathmiglo	1899	Strathmiglo South and Strathmiglo North

== See also ==
- Religion in the United Kingdom
