= Thomas Main (minister) =

Scottish minister (1808–1892)

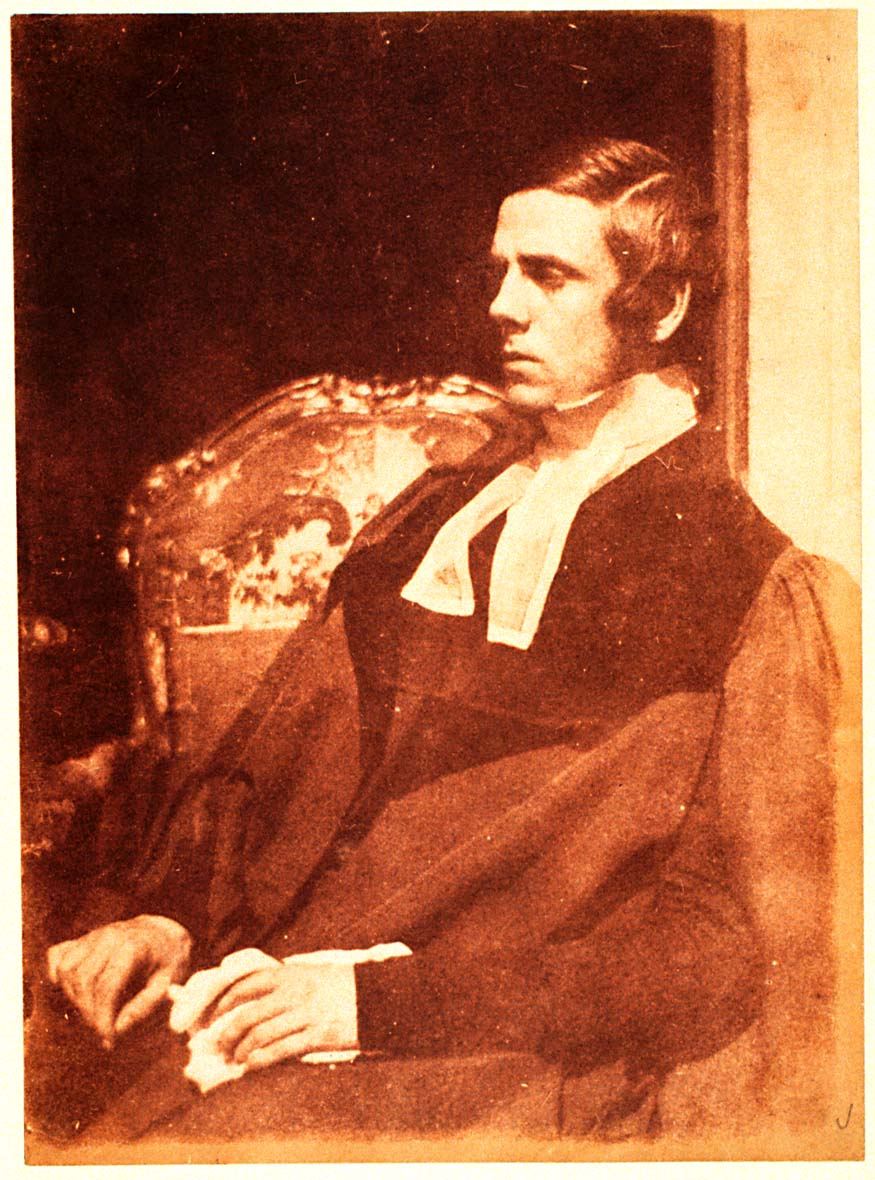
- Thomas Main by Hill & Adamson
- Church: Church of Scotland; Free Church of Scotland

Personal details
- Born: 5 January 1816
- Died: 28 May 1881 (aged 65)

minister of High Kirk, Kilmarnock
- In office 8 August 1839 – 1843

minister Free Church Kilmarnock
- In office 1843–1857

minister of Free St. Mary's, Edinburgh
- In office 1857–1881

Moderator of the General Assembly of the Free Church of Scotland
- In office 20 May 1880 – 28 May 1881

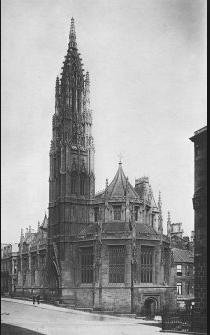
St Mary's Free Church, Edinburgh c.1860

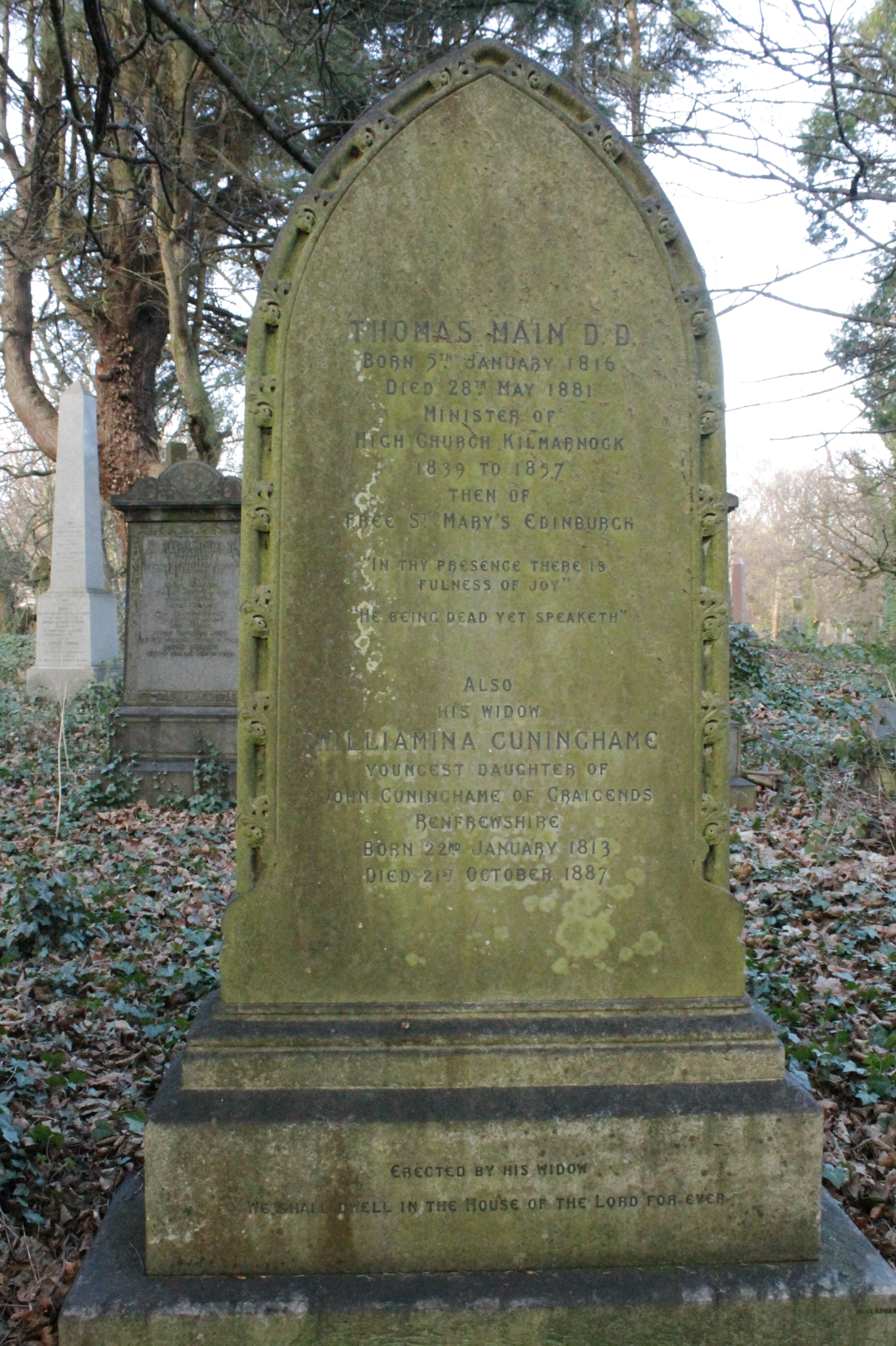
The grave of Rev Thomas Main, Warriston Cemetery

Thomas Main (1816–1881) was a Scottish minister who served as Moderator of the General Assembly for the Free Church of Scotland 1880–81.

== Early life ==
He was born in Slamannan in central Scotland on 5 January 1816. His father was parish schoolmaster, from whom he received the rudiments of his education. When thirteen he attended the University of Glasgow, and seems to have been known for his industry and piety. Licensed to preach by the Presbytery of Glasgow, in October, 1838, in the following year he became minister of the High Church, Kilmarnock.

== Church activities ==
In the controversy which led to the Disruption he took an active, and, in fact, a leading part, and did considerable service in the cause of the Free Church movement, both in Kilmarnock and elsewhere. In the Disruption of 1843 he left the established Church of Scotland to join the Free Church of Scotland. In 1850 he married Williamina, youngest daughter of John Cunninghame of Craigends. In 1857 he translated to Free St Marys in Edinburgh, in place of Rev Henry Grey. St Marys was on Albany Street in Edinburgh's Second New Town. Main lived at 7 Bellevue Crescent, slightly to the north. His church Deacon at St Mary's was David Octavius Hill. His public work seems to have been mostly in connection with the Free Church, and was occasionally interrupted by a trip to London or the Continent. He was Convenor of the Free Church Education Committee from 1873 and Convenor of the Free Church Foreign Mission Committee from 1878. In 1880 he was elected Moderator of the General Assembly, in succession to Rev James Chalmers Burns. This is the highest position in the Free Church of Scotland. He was succeeded as Moderator in 1881 by Rev William Laughton. Returning from the Continent in 1880, in order to prepare for his duties as Moderator of the Free Church Assembly, he heard Dean Stanley preach in St. Margaret's, Westminster. Dr. Main's comment on leaving the church was, "much disappointed, there was little memorable in his sermon, and no gospel." His occupancy of the Moderator's chair was not without difficulty, and not without credit to himself. As Moderator of the General Assembly in 1880, it fell to him to admonish and to counsel Professor Robertson Smith, on then being restored to his chair, which he did in a Christian and dignified manner.

Dr. Main seems to have been an earnest and energetic minister, strongly attached to the Free Church, but tolerant and desirous of being fair to others.

== Legacy ==
He died soon after the General Assembly of 1881, on 28 May. He is buried in Warriston Cemetery. His grave lies on the south side of the central roundel.

After his death his wife published a Memorial of his life and work. The Memorials of the Life were reportedly written with considerable skill and taste. The sermons which occupy about half of the volume are strictly evangelical.

Due to his unexpected death the post as minister of St Mary's was not filled until 1883 (by Rev George Davidson).

St Mary's was demolished in 1983 to make way for an office building. The building had been compromised by the removal of its beautiful spire in 1956.

== Artistic recognition ==
He was photographed by Hill & Adamson around 1844.

== Family ==
In 1850 he married Williamina Cuninghame (1813-1887), youngest daughter of John Cuninghame of Craigends.
