= James Chalmers Burns =

Scottish minister (1809–1892)

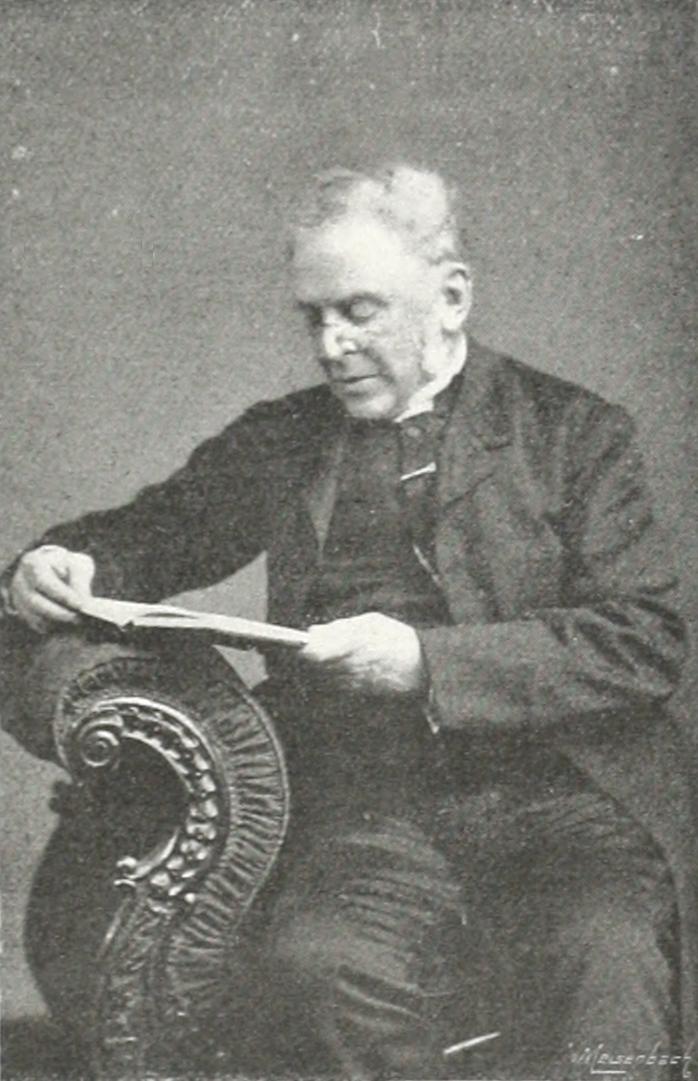
- by Meisenbach from "Gospel Triumphs"
- Church: London Wall

Personal details
- Born: 29 March 1809
- Died: 30 November 1892 (aged 83)

James Chalmers Burns (29 March 1809 – 30 November 1892) was a Scottish minister, who served as Moderator of the General Assembly for the Free Church of Scotland 1879/80.

== Early life and education ==
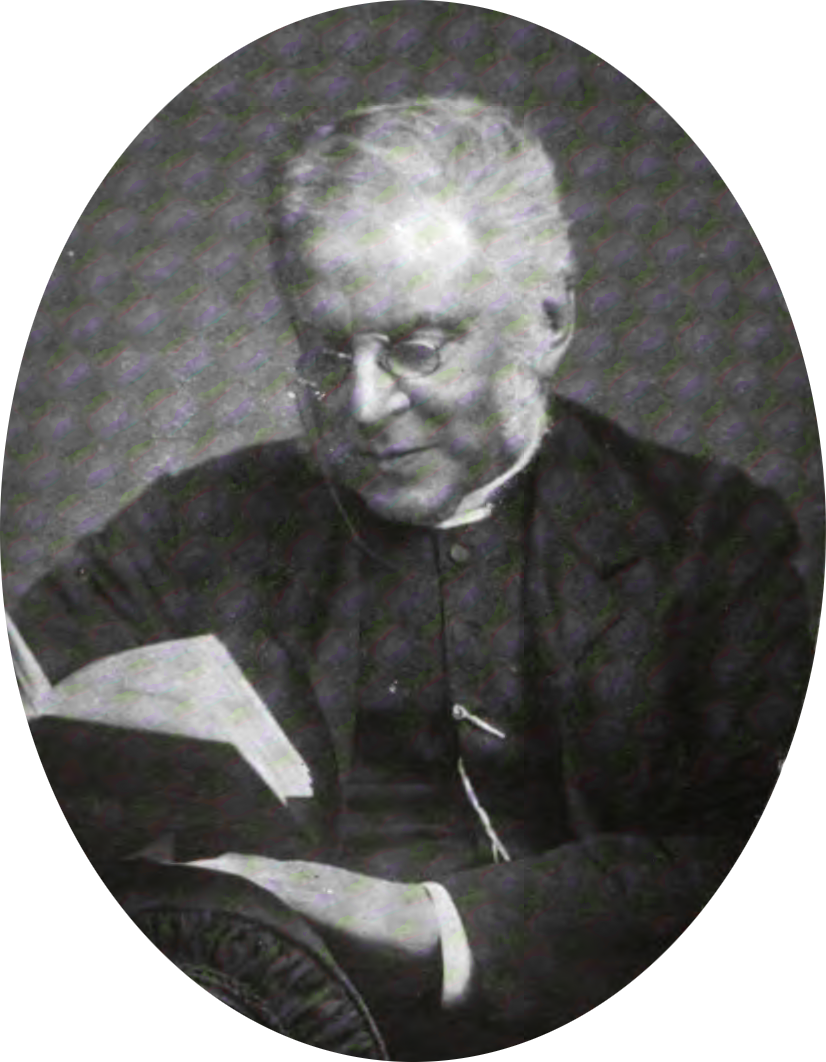
James Chalmers Burns from Chalmers and Trail

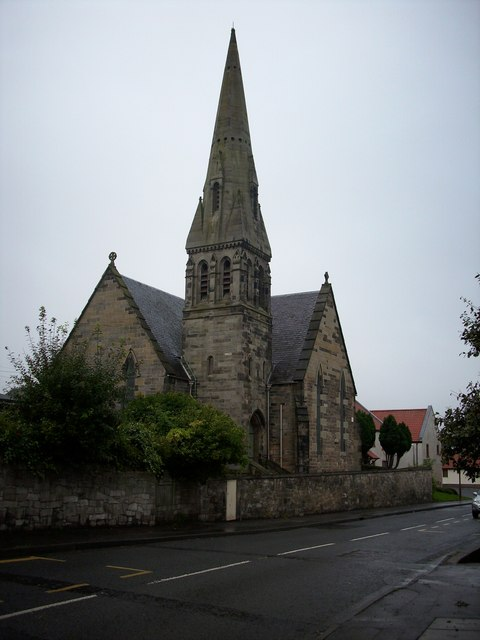
Kirkliston Free Church

He was born on 29 March 1809 in the manse at Brechin the second son of the Rev. James Burns (1774–1837) and his wife Christina Chalmers (1774–1837). His father was minister of the Cathedral Church there. He had three uncles well known to the Scottish Church, one of whom was a founder of the Presbyterian Church of Canada. They were the Rev. William Burns, D.D., minister of the parish of Duns before the Disruption, and of the Free Church at Kilsyth; the Rev. Robert Burns, before 1843 a minister at Paisley, and later a prominent leader of the Presbyterian Church in Canada, and Professor in one of its colleges; and the Rev. George Burns, minister of the parish of Tweedsmuir, and of the Free Church at Costorphine. On his mother's side Burns was also descended from a clerical family, the Chalmers of Aberdeen. His grandfather, James Chalmers, a printer, was founder of The Aberdeen Journal.

He studied divinity at Glasgow University. His first employment was as assistant to Rev Dr James Buchanan at North Leith Church on Madeira Street in Edinburgh.

== Early ministry ==
He was ordained into the Church of Scotland at the Scots Church at London Wall in 1837.

In the Disruption of 1843 he left the established church and joined the Free Church, being given an immediate position at Kirkliston. The church, originally built as a simple box chapel, was one of the first built for the Free Church and was opened by Rev Thomas Chalmers himself.

== Oversees work ==
In supplying the summer stations at Lausanne, Cannes, and Aix-les-Bains, Burns became acquainted with Continental life, and widened his theological outlook. For a long period he filled the office of Convener of the Colonial Committee of his Church. In the winter of 1849–50 he spent six months in Canada. For some weeks he supplied the pulpit of Chalmers' Church, Quebec, with so much acceptance that he was urgently requestcd to remain as permanent minister. Then he went to Montreal, where he preached for five months in the Colte Church. There also he proved popular and was cordially invited to undertake the pastoral charge of the congregation. Once more, in 1874, he crossed the Atlantic in company with the James Hood Wilson, Barclay Church, Edinburgh. They went as a deputation to the Presbyterian Assembly of America, which met that year at St. Louis. Thereafter they passed on to Halifax, where the Synod of the Canadian Church was gathered. Some idea of their work may be gathered from the fact that during their short visit they had to preach thirty sermons and give one hundred and twelve addresses.

== Wider church work ==
In 1879 he was elected Moderator of the General Assembly, succeeding Rev Andrew Bonar. He was succeeded as Moderator in 1880 by Rev Thomas Main.

Dr. Burns was connected with the British Society for the Propagation of the Gospel Among the Jews from its beginning. He was present at the meeting held in the National Scotch Church, Regent Square, London, on November 7, 1842, at which the British Society was formed.

A spire was added to his church in 1880 greatly improving the appearance, to a design by Edinburgh architect, Hippolyte Blanc.

He retired as minister of Kirkliston in 1890 being replaced by Rev Robert Alexander Lendrum.

He died on 30 November 1892 and is buried in Kirkliston churchyard.

Kirkliston Free Church is now the Thomas Chalmers Centre.

== Works ==
- Christian and Ecclesiastical Unity (London, 1841)
- Memorial of James Maitland Hog of Newliston (Edinburgh, 1858)
- How the Spirit of God may be Quenched (Edinburgh, 1859)
- Addresses in General Assembly (Edinburgh, 1879)
- "London Reminiscences 1843" (Brown's Annals of the Disruption, 529–43) (Edinburgh, 1892)
- edited Select Remains of Professor Islay Burns, D.D. (London, 1874).

== Artistic recognition ==
He was portrayed by William Hole RSA in 1887.

== Family ==
He married 1838, Anne (born 1815, died 17 October 1884), daughter of Thomas Robertson, Commander Royal Navy, and Susan Barr, and had issue —

- Susan Robertson, born 7 August 1839, died at Edinburgh 24 August 1914
- Christina Chalmers, born 1843 (married her cousin, James Guthrie of Pitforthie, banker, Brechin, son of Thomas Guthrie), died 14 December 1923
- Anne Jemima Guthrie, born 19 June 1845 (married her cousin, Charles John Guthrie, K.C., LL.D., Senator of the College of Justice [Lord Guthrie], also son of Thomas Guthrie, D.D.), died 28 May 1927
- Alice Mary, born 1850, died at Edinburgh 25 February 1927
- James Thomas, born 14 March 1852, died 30 July 1881
- William Charles Mansfield, born 11 July 1860, died 7 June 1864.
