= Gustavus Aird =

Scottish minister and campaigner against the Highland Clearances

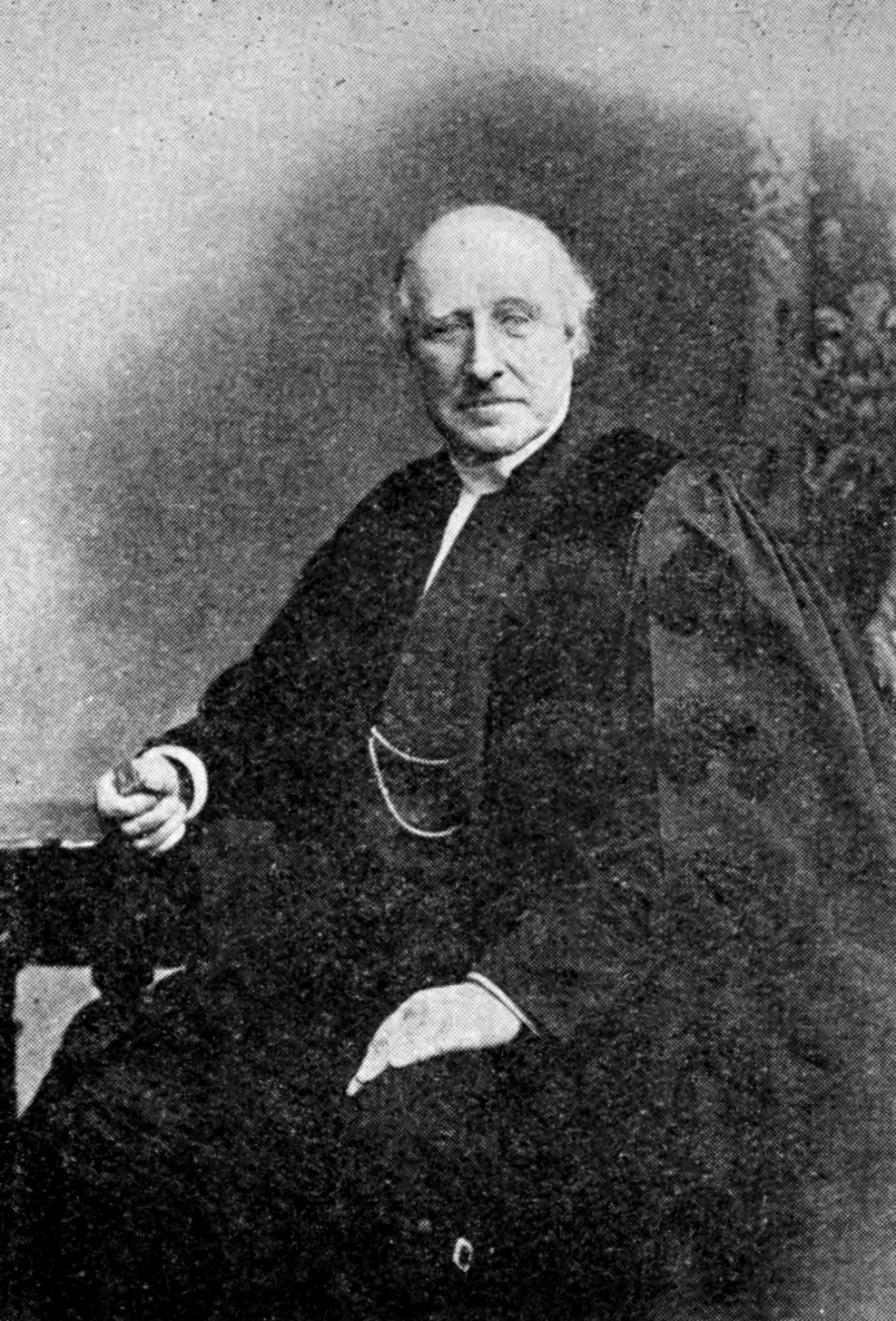
- Gustavus Aird from Caithness and Sutherland
- Church: Church of Scotland; Free Church of Scotland

Personal details
- Born: 28 June 1813
- Died: 20 December 1898 (aged 85)

Gustavus Aird (1813–1898) was a Scottish minister of the Free Church of Scotland who served as Gaelic Moderator of the General Assembly in Inverness in 1888. He was an active campaigner against the Highland Clearances.

== Life ==
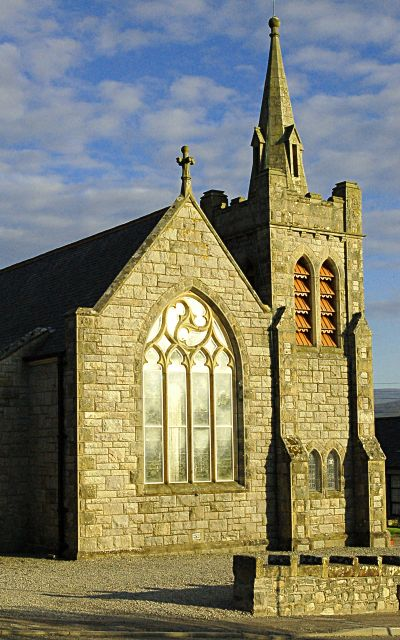
Creich Church of Scotland, Bonar Bridge

He was born on 28 June 1813 at Heathfield in Kilmuir, Easter Ross, the youngest son of Gustavus Aird and his wife Ann Grant. He studied Divinity at King's College, Aberdeen.

In 1839 he was licensed to preach by the Church of Scotland and Presbytery of Tain. In 1841 he was ordained at Croick in Kincardine parish in Sutherland. His manse stood on the Black Water. During his period here he struggled to protect his congregation against eviction by the laird, William Robertson of Kindeace House, as part of the Highland Clearances in the Tain area. Despite assurances that if tenants paid their rent they could continue, the laird did not honour this promise, and the parish was greatly depopulated as a result.

He left the established church in the Disruption of 1843 and joined the Free Church of Scotland. He left Croick and moved to the Free Church in the rather similarly named Creich, which is close to Croick. All but two families left the original congregation and followed him to Creich. The local laird died in London in April 1844 and was succeeded by his son Major Charles Robertson, formerly of the Black Watch, but this changed little in the parish. In May 1845 the tenants of Glencalvie were evicted 'en masse', despite Aird's protestation. 250 persons were so affected. They then had no house and no church within which to shelter, as the Free Church had yet to be built, and they worshipped in a field and slept under tarpaulins in the churchyard for two nights before dispersing to find new lives and new homes. Hand-etched writing on the current church east window describes their desperate plight. A further wave of clearances occurred at nearby Greenyards in 1854 at the hand of James Gillanders, son-in-law of Charles Robertson.

In 1885 Aberdeen University awarded him an honorary doctorate (DD).

In 1888 he served as Gaelic Moderator in Inverness whilst the standard location in Edinburgh appears to have not been used in that year. He appears photographed in the Moderator's robes in 1888, and records indicate he was the only Moderator in that year.

He died in Sale, Manchester on 20 December 1898 but is buried in Migdale Free Churchyard at Bonar Bridge. There is also an ornate memorial at Creich.

== Publications ==
- Religious Life in Ross
- Daorsa Agus Saorsa
- Sketch of Rev. Mr Fraser - Biography of Rev. James Fraser of Brea
- Searmon a rinneadh leis an ure (Glasgow, 1889)
- Farewell Gaelic and English Sermons preached in Creich Free Church, 15 Nov. 1896 (portrait) (Inverness, 1897)
- Sermon (Dingwall, n.d.)
- Sermon (Edinburgh, 1916)
- Bondage and Liberty (Edinburgh, 1917)

== Family ==
In 1861 he married Mary Sim (1818–1900), the fourth daughter of William Sim JP.

He was the maternal uncle of Gustavus Aird Murray (born 1833).
