= Gordon Webster =

Scottish minister

Gordon Webster (1841–1903) was a 19th-century Scottish minister of the Free Church of Scotland who served as Moderator of the General Assembly to the Free Church of Scotland in New Zealand in 1898.

== Life ==
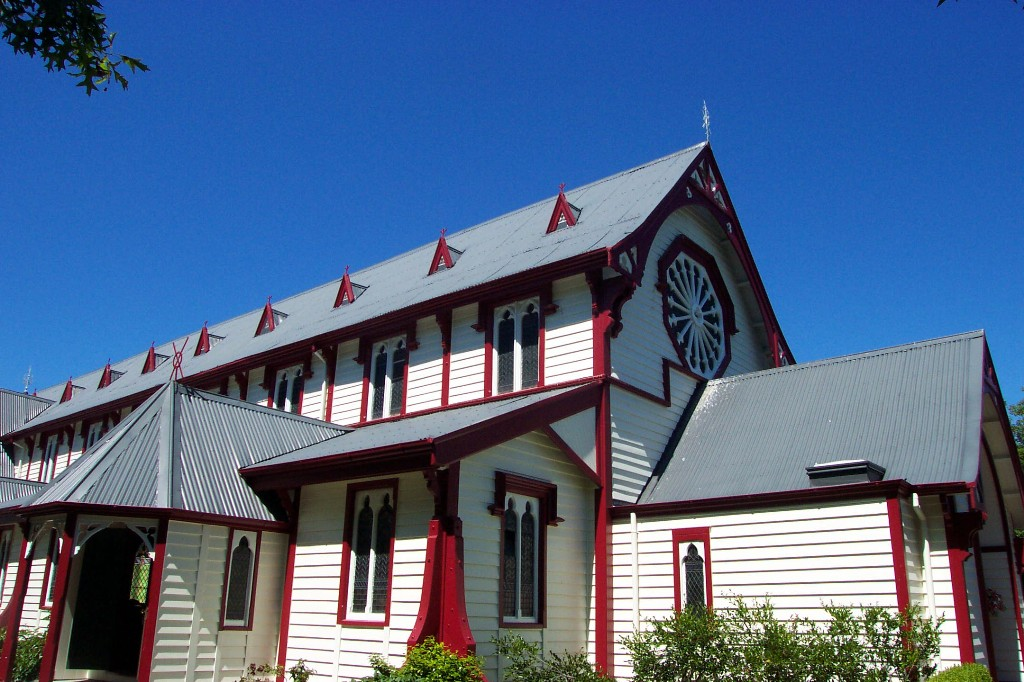
St Andrews Presbyterian Church in Christchurch

He was born on 28 October 1841 at Panmurefield at Broughty Ferry near Dundee, the only son of Gordon Webster, a bleacher, and his wife, Elizabeth Simpson. He was educated at the High School of Dundee and originally trained as an engineer and was apprenticed at Low's Foundry in Monifieth. He then studied at the University of Edinburgh graduating MA in 1867 before training as a Free Church of Scotland minister at New College, Edinburgh.

He was ordained by the Free Church of Scotland in Girvan in 1872.

In December 1887 he moved to St Andrew's Church in Christchurch, New Zealand. The church is an interesting example of prefabricated construction, overclad in timber and is a listed building. He served as Moderator in 1898 and retired in 1900.

He returned to Scotland. He had unsuccessful surgery on an internal complaint in May 1903 and died at 22 Corrennie Gardens in Morningside, Edinburgh on 18 July 1903. He is buried in Doune Cemetery in Girvan. A memorial service was held in St Andrews Church in Christchurch on 26 July led by the Rev Mr Erwin.

== Family ==
In 1875 he married Jane Hunter Blyth (1850–1926), daughter of Rev Adam Blyth of the Free Church, his predecessor in Girvan.

Their eldest daughter Jane Allan Webster (1876–1964) married Rev James Irwin (1877-1960) of the Irish Presbyterian Church.

Their daughter Elizabeth ("Bessie") Simpson Webster died whilst an infant in Girvan.

Their eldest son George Webster (1878–1965) developed ulcers in the eyes and joined the family in New Zealand where he then stayed until death.

Their youngest son, Adam Blyth Webster (1882–1956) became Professor of English at St Andrews University and had a six year literary correspondence with Rudyard Kipling.
