= Kilmuir, Easter Ross =

Coordinates: 57.732779°N 4.088459°W

Kilmuir
- Location within the Ross and Cromarty area
- OS grid reference: NH757733
- Council area: Highland
- Country: Scotland
- Sovereign state: United Kingdom
- Post town: Invergordon
- Postcode district: IV18 0
- Police: Scotland
- Fire: Scottish
- Ambulance: Scottish

Kilmuir is a former fishing village, located on the north eastern shore of Nigg Bay, one mile (1.5 kilometres) southeast of Kildary and four miles (six kilometres) northeast of Invergordon.

== Geography ==
The village of Kilmuir is within the former parish of Kilmuir Easter. The parish was situated partly in the county of Ross-shire and partly in the county of Cromartyshire.

At the last census (2011), the population of the civil parish was 1100. The area of the parish is 11,008 acres.

== History ==
A document dated 30 January 1747 records six men aged over 16 who lived in the village of Kilmuir (Kilmuire), in the parish of Kilmuir-Easter, Ross-shire who did not take part in the Jacobite rising of 1745, even though they lived on the Jacobite Lord Cromartie's estate. They were: James Munro, tenant in Kilmuire; Andrew Roy, tenant in Kilmuire; John Mackenzie, tenant in Kilmuire; Walter?Mailevin, tenant in Kilmuire; Alexander Munro, Wright in Kilmuire; David Munro, his brother.

Tarbat House is a mile east of the village.

== Church ==
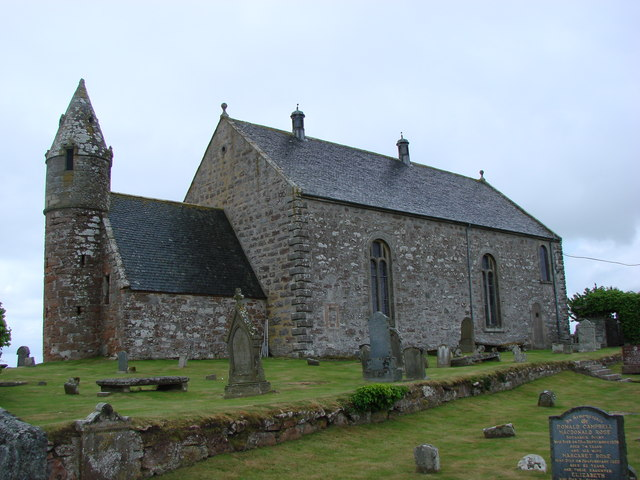
Kilmuir Easter parish church which is located in the village of Kilmuir

The tower and belfry, which are the oldest parts of the Kilmuir-Easter parish church, were apparently built by George Munro, 4th of Milntown in the early 17th century. The conical stone belfry is dated 1616 with the initials of George Munro.

According to 19th-century historian Alexander Mackenzie, Andrew Beg Munro, 3rd of Milntown, who died before 1522, was "buried in the east end of the Church of Kilmuir-Easter, near the (Munro of) Allan burying ground", and George Munro, 4th of Milntown who died in 1576 was "buried in the Kilmuir-Easter Churchyard".

== Notable people ==
Gustavus Aird born here.
