= Henry Grey (minister) =

British minister of the Scottish Free Church

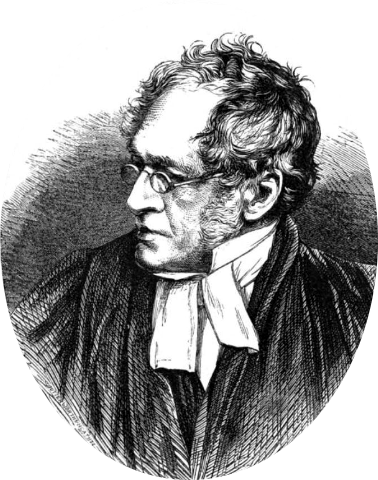
- Church: St Mary's Edinburgh

Personal details
- Born: 1778
- Died: 1859 (aged 80–81)

Henry Grey (1778–1859) was a Scottish minister in the Church of Scotland and following the Disruption of 1843 in the Free Church. He served as Moderator of the General Assembly of the Free Church of Scotland in 1844.

== Early life ==
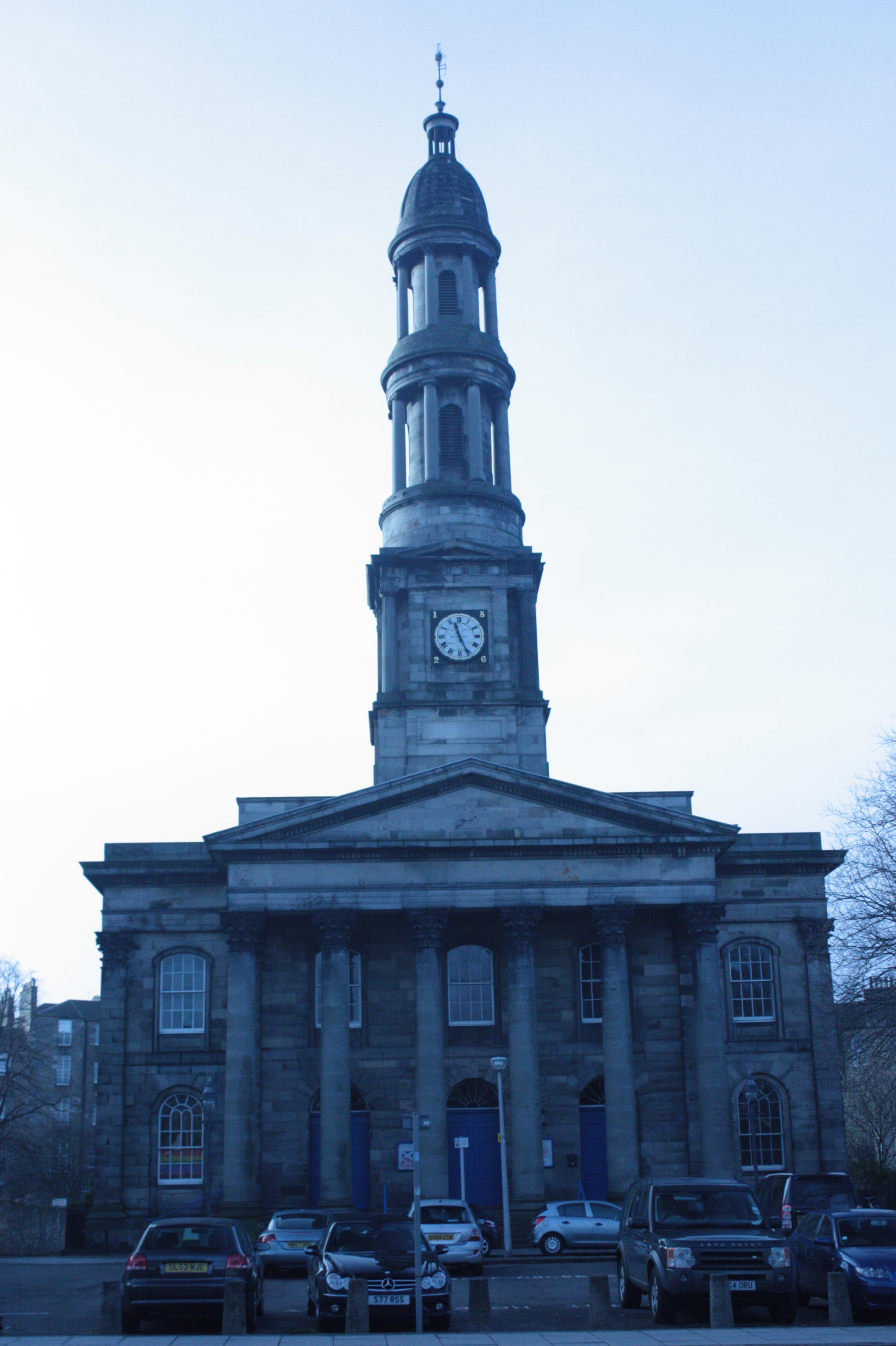
St Mary's Bellevue, Edinburgh

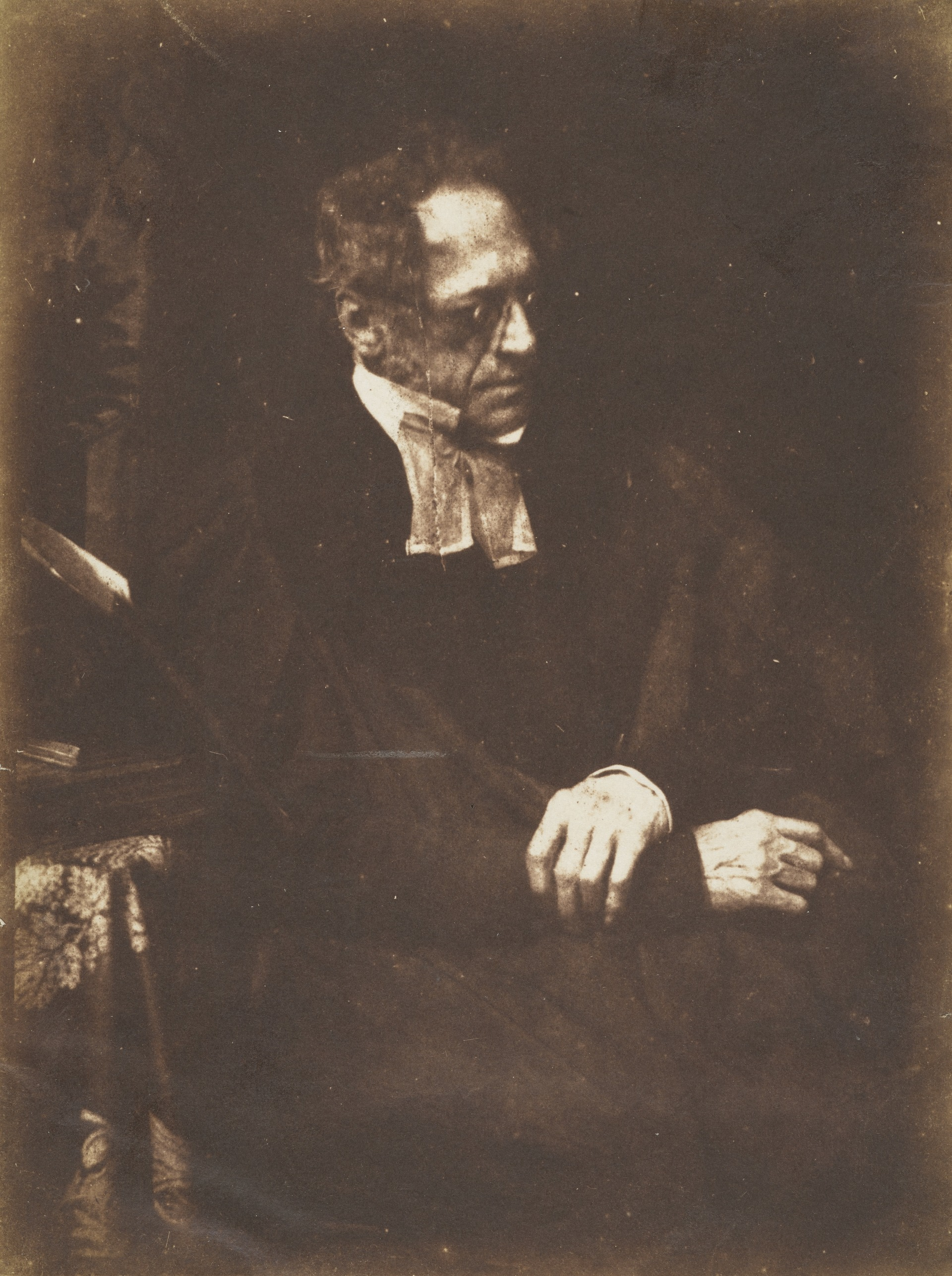
Henry Grey by Hill & Adamson

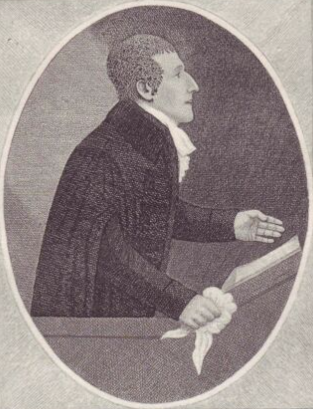
Henry Grey of Edinburgh by John Kay

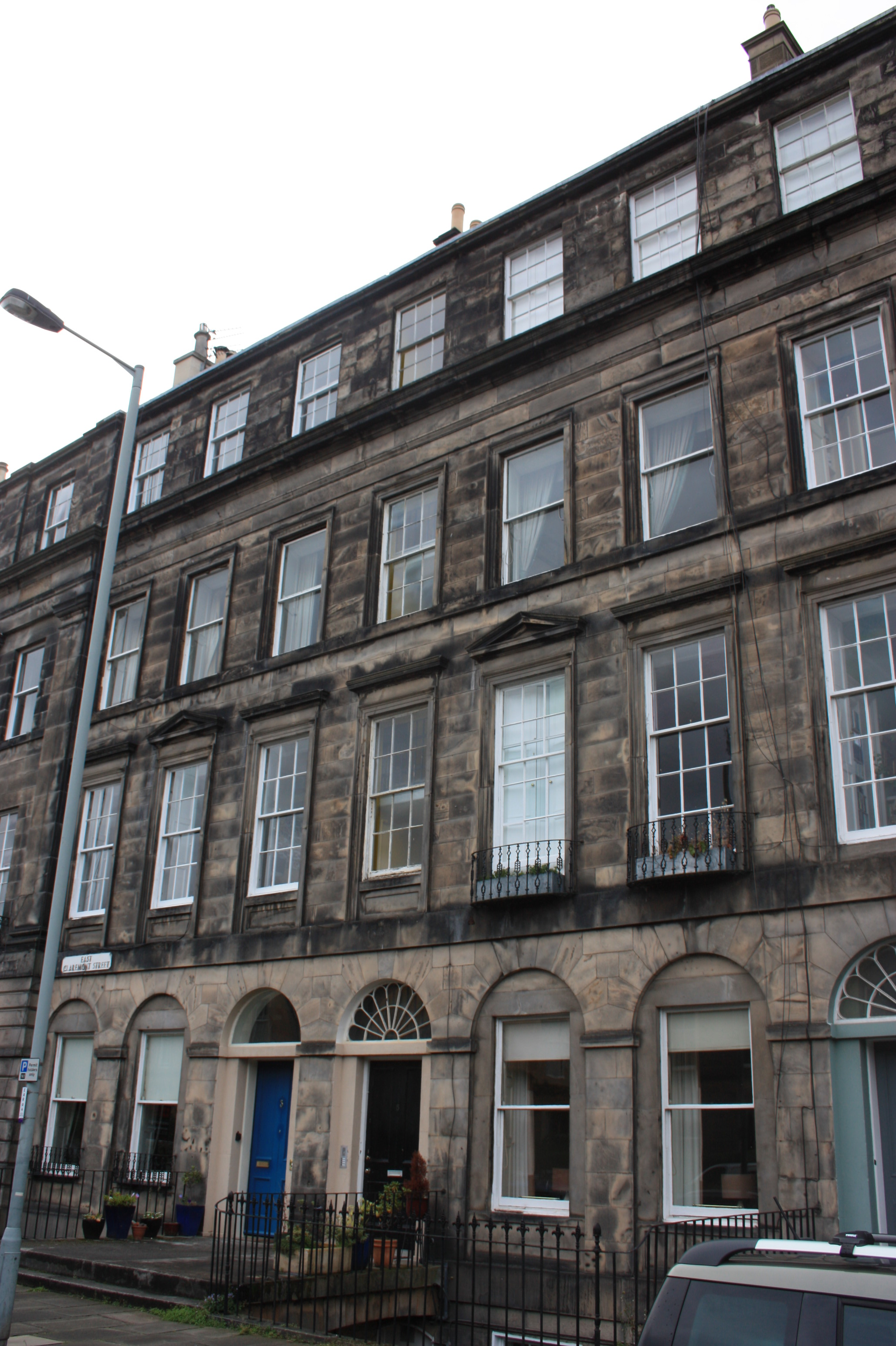
5 East Claremont Street, Edinburgh

Grey was born on 11 February 1778, at Alnwick, Northumberland. His father was a physician in Morpeth. His education was at a private school in Highhedgely with a final 18 months in Newcastle-upon-Tyne. In Newcastle he attended lectures by Henry Moyes (on a tour of Britain) and was greatly influenced by his thinking. His mother had an early breach with his father, and after his education moved with her son to Edinburgh in 1793. There he passed through the usual course of study preparatory to entering into the office of the ministry in the Church of Scotland. He was licensed to preach by the Presbytery of Edinburgh in November 1800. He was ordained in 1801.

== Ministry ==
Grey's sympathies were wholly with the evangelical portion of the church.

In September 1801 he was ordained as minister of the parish of Stenton in East Lothian. This was a quiet place, where he spent 12 years, including getting married and starting a family. In 1813 he was called to the Buccleuch Chapel in south Edinburgh - a charge recently formed by Rev Sir Wellwood-Moncrieff, as a Chapel of Ease to St. Cuthbert's parish to address the growing population inn south Edinburgh. Grey's discourses were presented in a scholarly style and fervent manner, leading the way for Andrew Mitchell Thomson and Thomas Chalmers.

=== Apocrypha controversy ===
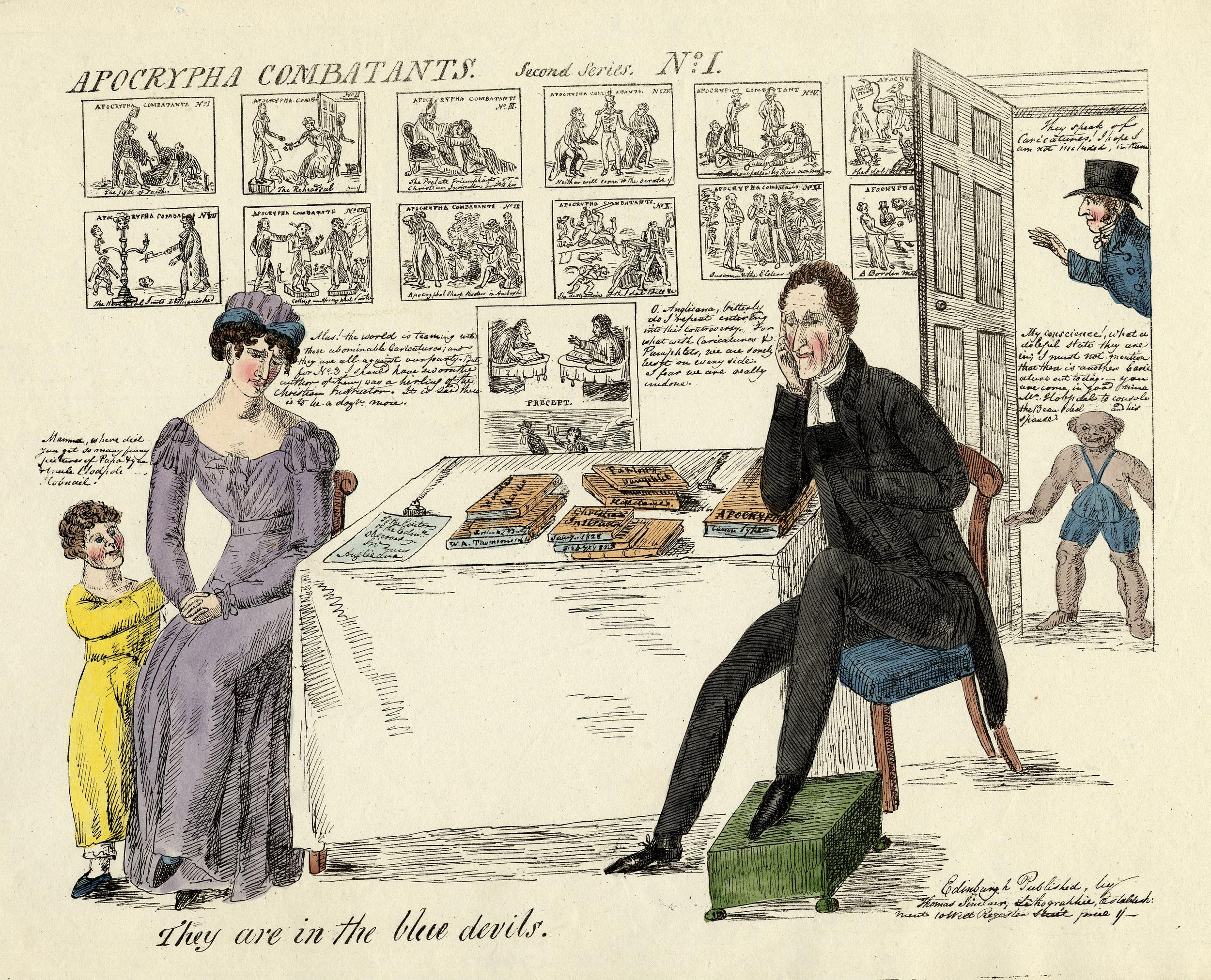
Henry Grey and his wife

On 11 January 1821 Grey was appointed to the New North Church, one of the four parish churches of Edinburgh contained within St Giles Cathedral, in place of the late Rev David Dickson. In October 1824 the town council chose Grey as minister of St Mary's Church in the Bellevue district (which was still under construction) and on completion in January 1825 he was therefore its first minister, his first service there being on the first Sunday after 13 January.

In the lead up to the Slavery Abolition Act 1833, Grey had taken part in agitation against slavery in the West Indies.

Four years after this last change of post, Grey clashed with Andrew Thomson, and they took opposite sides in the Apocrypha Controversy; they had been warm personal friends.

In the ecclesiastical struggle of the next few years, Grey opposed the civil courts. At the Disruption of 1843 he left the Church of Scotland and joined the Free Church of Scotland. Taking a large proportion of the Bellevue congregation with him, and had a new church built for him on the north side of Barony Street, 300m south of the original church. The building held a congregation of 800. This structure was short-lived, as it was not intended as the permanent home of the congregation. Although Grey was involved in the contract for the permanent building (on the corner of Albany street and Broughton Street) it was not completed until after Grey's death due to contractual problems.

In 1844, Grey was chosen as the second Moderator of the General Assembly of the Free Church. In the jubilee year of his ministry, a public testimonial was presented to him, which was turned into a foundation for the Grey Scholarships in the New College, Edinburgh. Grey's elders included David Octavius Hill.

A political reformer, he was the target of adverse criticism from some who agreed with his religious views.

== Death ==
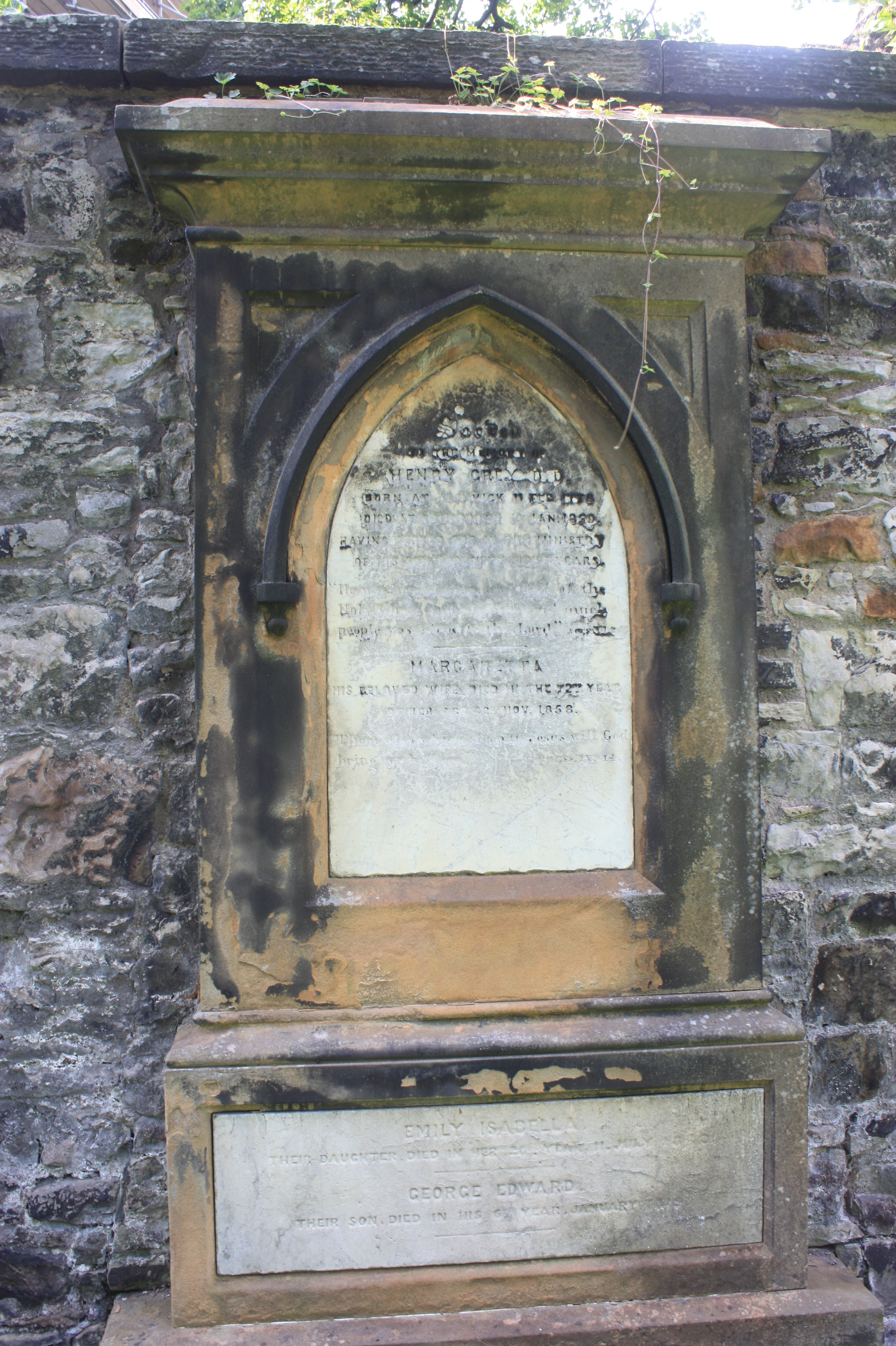
The grave of Rev Henry Grey DD, St Cuthberts Churchyard, Edinburgh

Grey retired from active ministry in 1857 with Free St Mary's being taken over by Rev Thomas Main.

Grey died suddenly in his eighty-first year, on Thursday 13 January 1859 at his home 5 East Claremont Street, a very large Georgian flat on the eastern fringe of the Edinburgh New Town.

He is buried in St Cuthbert's Churchyard at the west end of Princes Street with his wife Margaretta (1786–1858) and children Emily Isabella and George Edward Grey. The grave lies in the north-east corner of the northernmost section, abutting the churchyard of St John.

== Family ==
In October 1808 he married his cousin Margaretta Grey (1786-1858) eldest daughter of his paternal uncle, Rev George Grey of West Ord in Northumberland. Their children included:

- Mary Grey (1810-1857) married Rev John Hampton Gurney, rector of St Mary's Church, Bryaston Square in London
- Harriet Jane Grey (1811-1863) married Rev Charles Birrell of Pembroke Baptist Church in Liverpool, parents to Augustine Birrell
- George Edward Grey (1812-1819)
- Rev Henry Campbell Grey (1814-1854) vicar of Watling, Sussex
- Emelia Isabella (1816-1843)
- Edward John Grey (1820-1869)

== Publications ==
- Two Sacraments of the Christian Church: Baptism and the Communion (1811)
- Catechism on Baptism (Edinburgh, 1811)
- Sermon on Behalf of the Edinburgh Lunatic Asylum (1815)
- The Diffusion of Christianity Dependent on the Exertions of Christians (1818)
- The Veil of Moses done away in Christ (1820)
- Man's Judgment at Variance with God's (1824)
- Review of Remarks Relative to his Connection with the Letters of Anglicanus Edinburgh, 1828)
- The Duty and Desirableness of Frequent Communion with Christ in the Sacrament of the Supper (Edinburgh, 1832)
- Address to the Congregation of St Mary's (Edinburgh, 1843)
- A Parting Memorial (Edinburgh, 1858)
- Thoughts in the Evening of Life, ed. with Memoir by C. M. Birrell (London, 1871)
- Lecture IV., "On the Conversion of the Jews " (Edinburgh, 1842)

== Memorials ==
A marble bust of Henry Grey stands in New College, Edinburgh, sculpted by Patric Park in 1853.
