= Nathaniel Paterson =

Free Church of Scotland minister and author

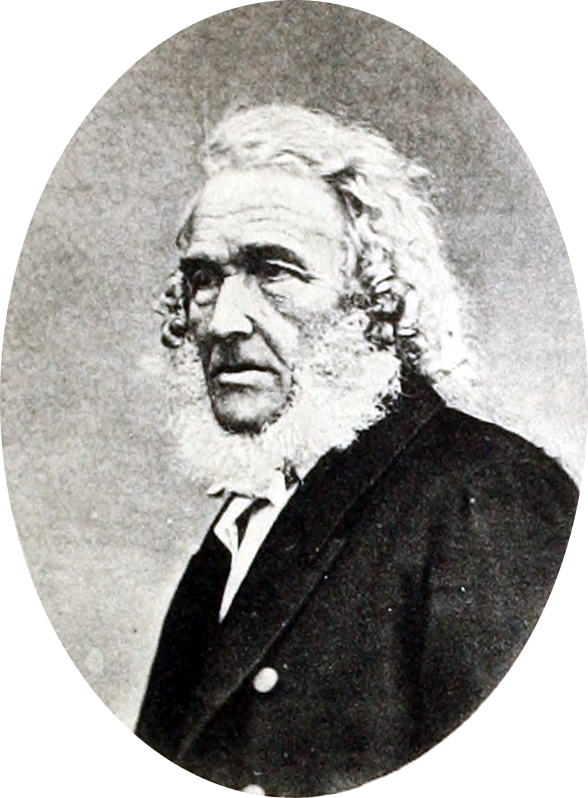
- Church: Free St Andrews Glasgow
- Archdiocese: Glasgow
- In office: 1843-1865
- Predecessor: founding minister
- Successor: John Isdale
- Previous post: Galasheils 1821-1834, St. Andrews Glasgow 1834-1844

Orders
- Ordination: August 30, 1821

Personal details
- Born: Nathaniel Paterson; 3 July 1787 Kells
- Died: 25 April 1871 (aged 83) Helensburgh
- Denomination: Free Church of Scotland
- Spouse: Helen Laidlaw (1800-1864)
- Children: 9
- Education: University of Edinburgh, Glasgow University DD, 1837

Nathaniel Paterson (1787–25 April 1871) was a Scottish minister who served as Moderator of the General Assembly to the Free Church of Scotland in 1850/51. He was a close friend of Walter Scott and was included in his circle of "worthies".

== Life ==
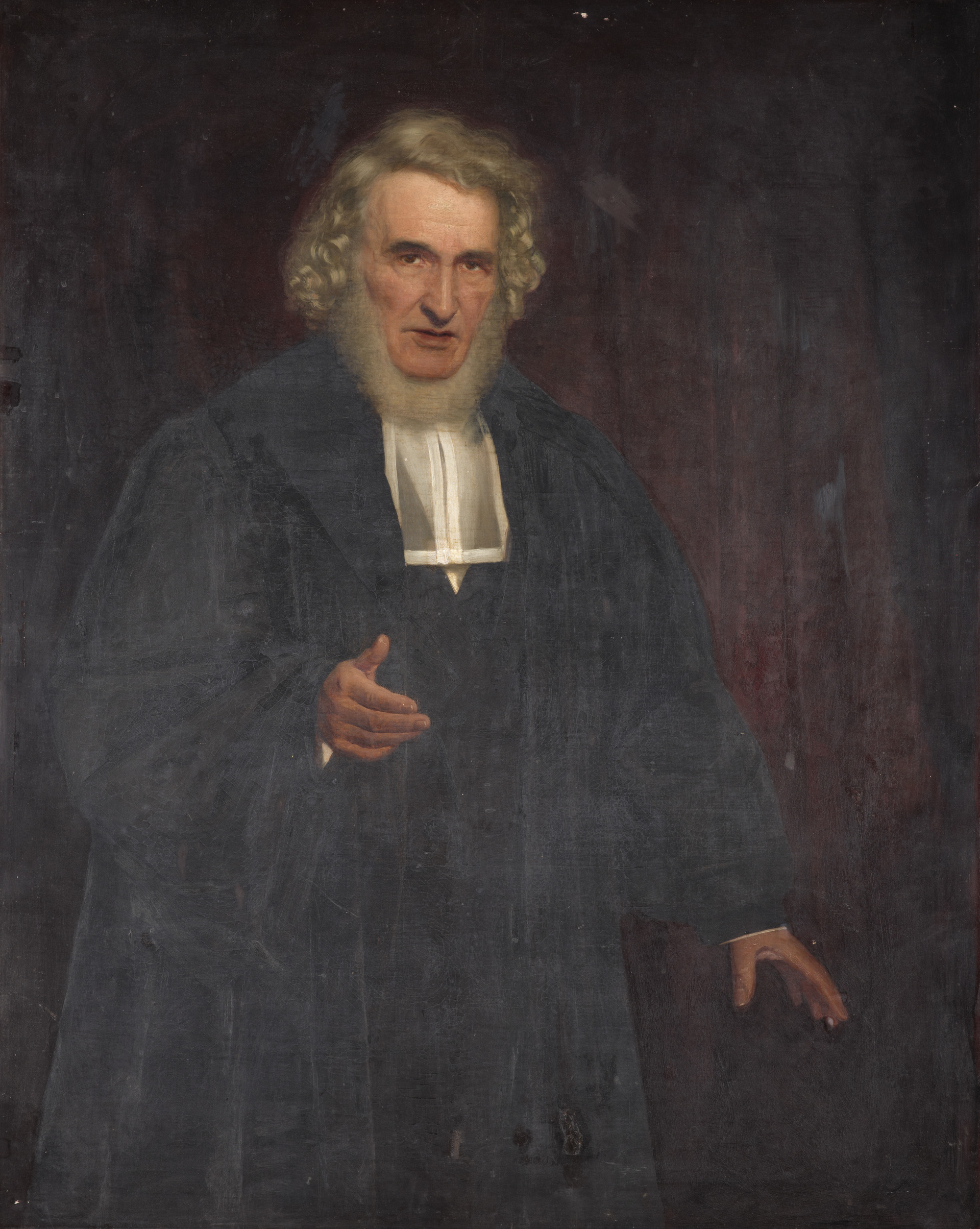
Nathaniel Paterson by John James Napier

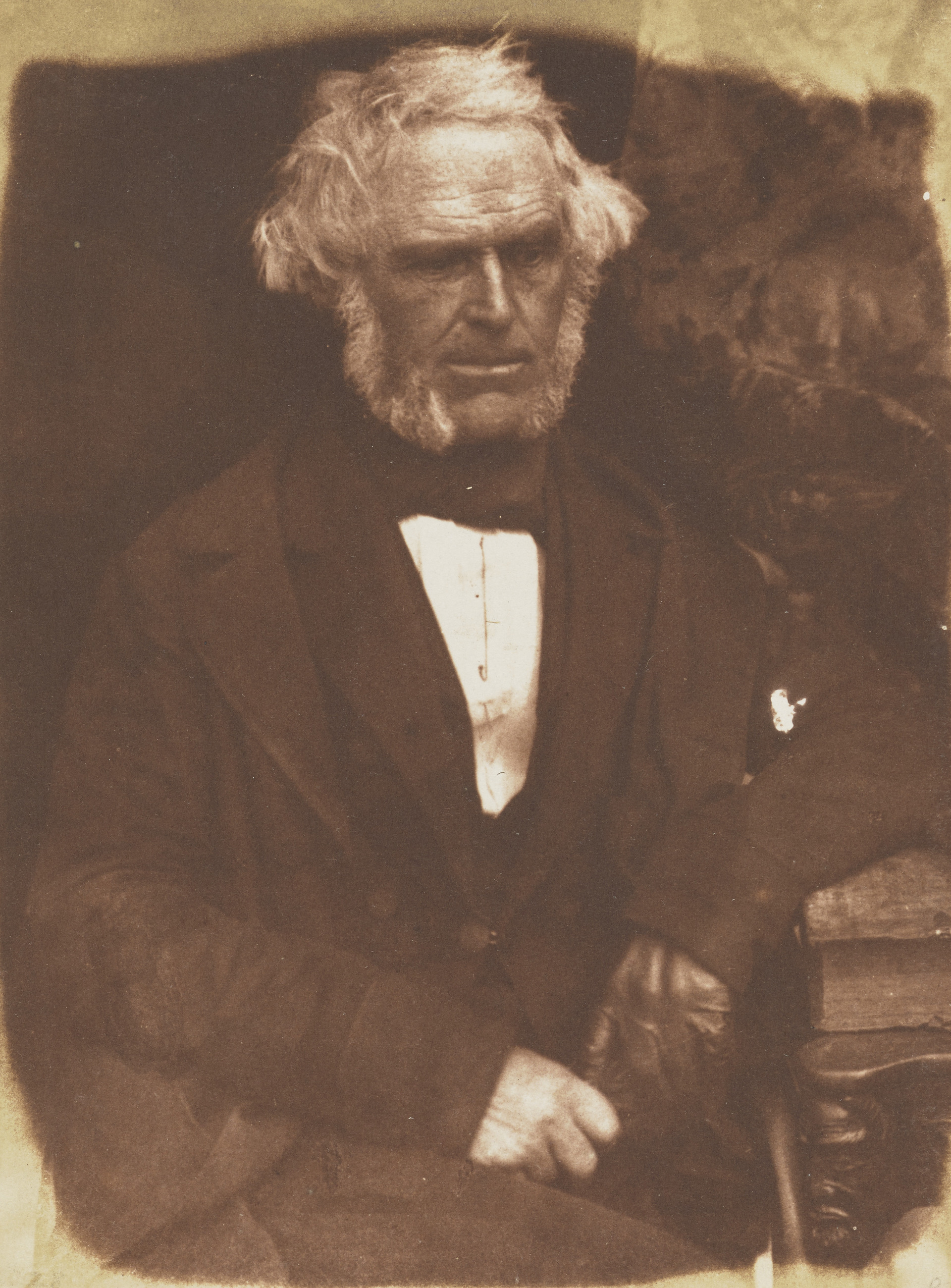
Nathaniel Paterson by Robert Adamson and David Octavius Hill

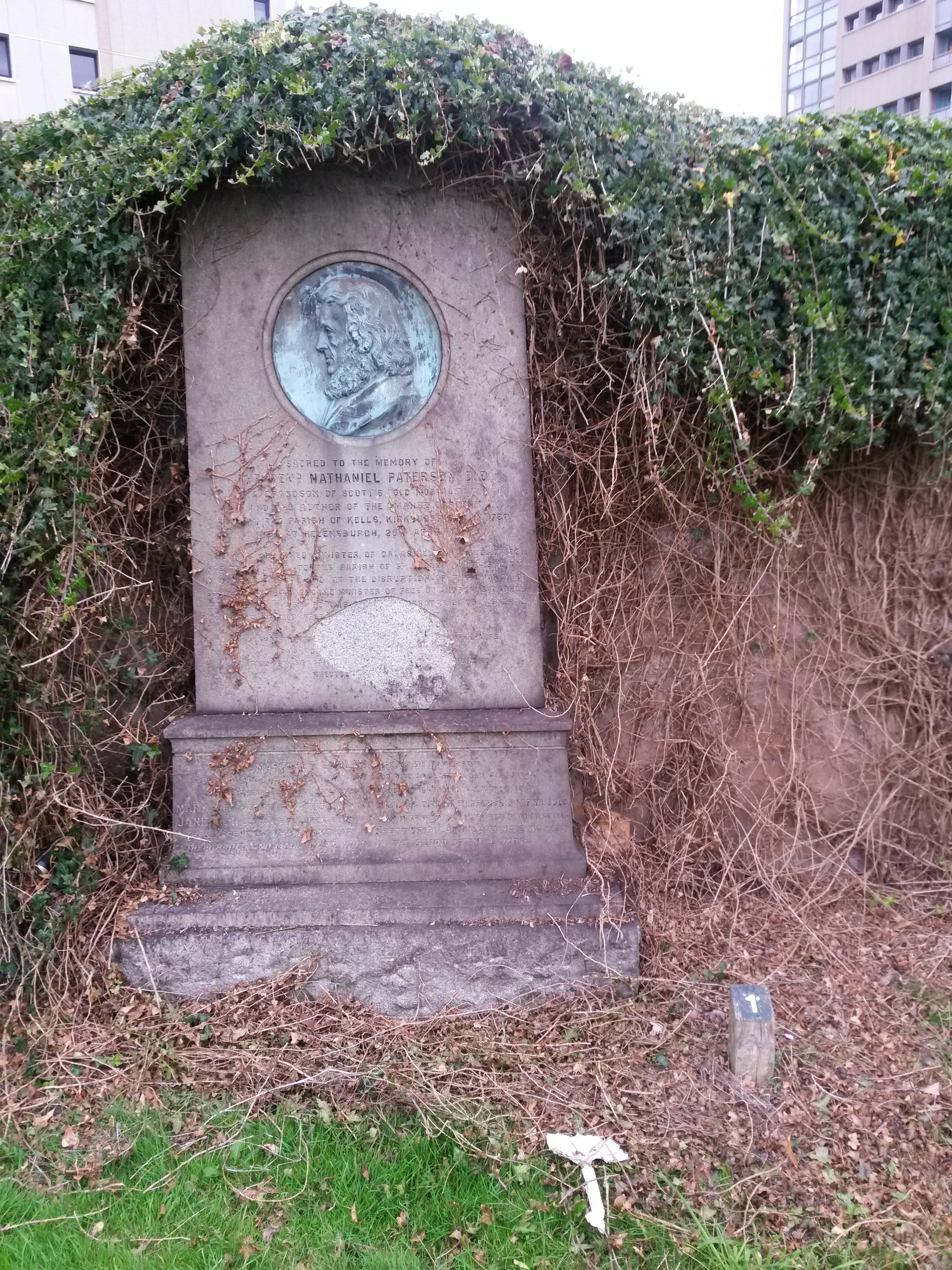
Paterson's tomb at the Southern Necropolis in Glasgow

He was born in Kells in Kirkcudbrightshire in 1787, the eldest son of Mary Locke and her husband, Walter Paterson a stone engraver, and grandson of Robert Paterson a.k.a. "Old Mortality".

Paterson was educated at Balmaclellan. In 1804 he went to the University of Edinburgh to study divinity. Not until 1816 was he licensed by the Church of Scotland, initially being employed as an assistant at Linlithgow. He took some time to find a patron and only in 1821 became minister of Galashiels. In 1833 he moved to St Andrews Church in Glasgow. This church stood on Greendyke Street near Glasgow Green.

In the Disruption of 1843 he left the established Church of Scotland and, together with a large part of his original congregation, created the Free St Andrews Church. They worshipped in a rear hall in the Black Bull Inn while the new church was built. The new church stood on the corner of Hanover Street and Cathedral Street.

In 1850 he replaced Mackintosh MacKay as Moderator of the Free Church. He in turn was succeeded in 1851 by Alexander Duff.

He retired to Helensburgh around 1864 and died there on 25 April 1871. He is buried in Glasgow Southern Necropolis on Caledonia Road in Glasgow.

== Publications ==
- The Manse Garden (1836)
- The Cry of the Perishing (1842)
- Popery: The Enemy of the Souls of Man
- Popery Accommodated to Human Corruption

== Artistic recognition ==
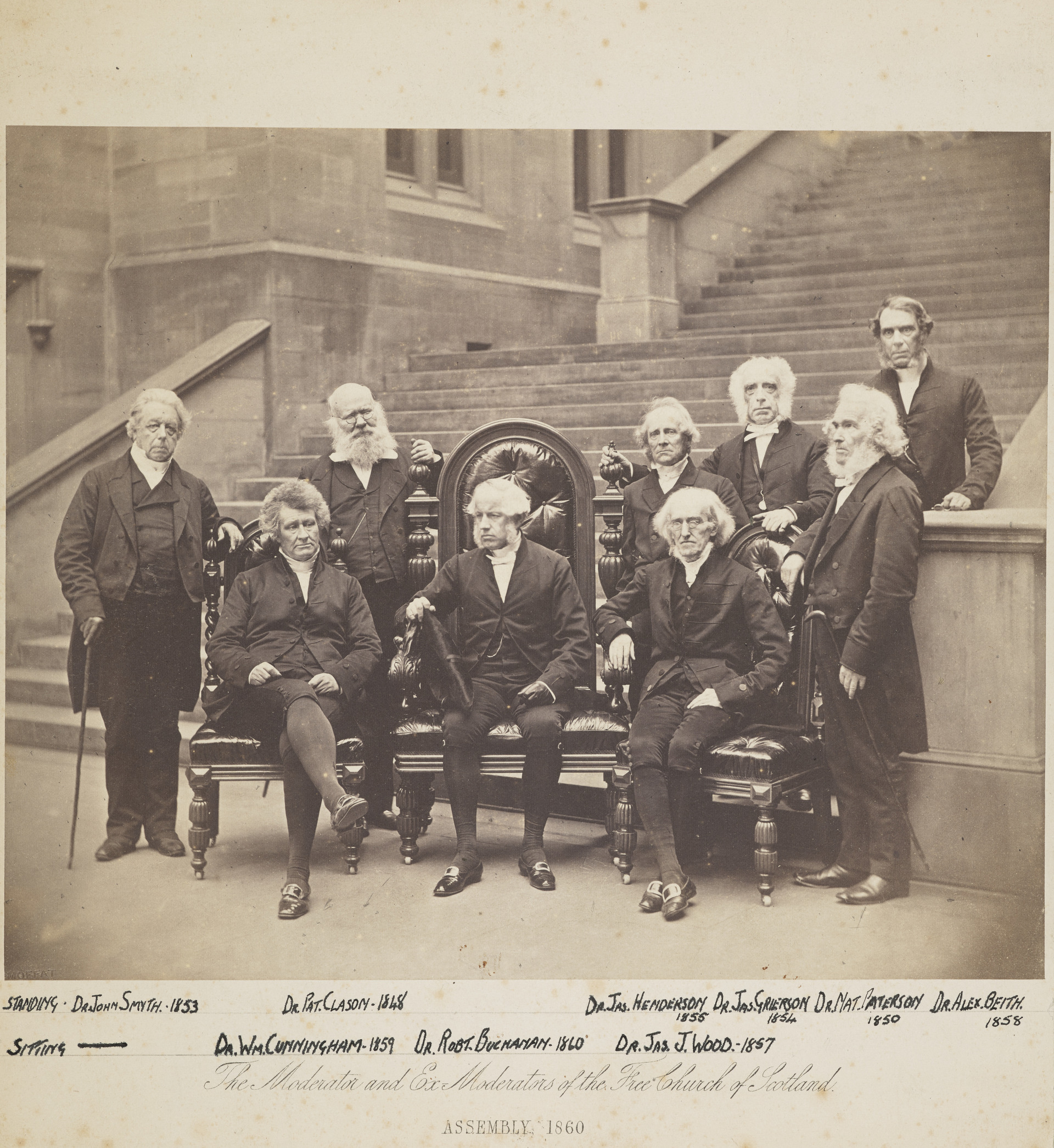
The Moderator and Ex Moderators of the Free Church of Scotland, Assembly; 1860. Pictured, from left to right, are (standing) John Smyth, Patrick Clason, James Henderson, James Grierson, Paterson and Alexander Beith (behind); (seated) William Cunningham, Robert Buchanan and James Julius Wood.

He was photographed by Hill & Adamson in 1850. He was photographed in 1860 at the foot of the steps to New College with several other ex-Moderators of the Free Church.

== Family ==
In February 1825 he married Margaret Laidlaw (1800-1864), daughter of Robert Laidlaw.

His brother, Walter Paterson (1790-1849) was Free Church minister of Kirkurd.

Scott notes 9 children, two who died in infancy. Survived by 4 sons, and 3 daughters.
