= Robert Buchanan (minister) =

Scottish minister and historian (1802–1875)

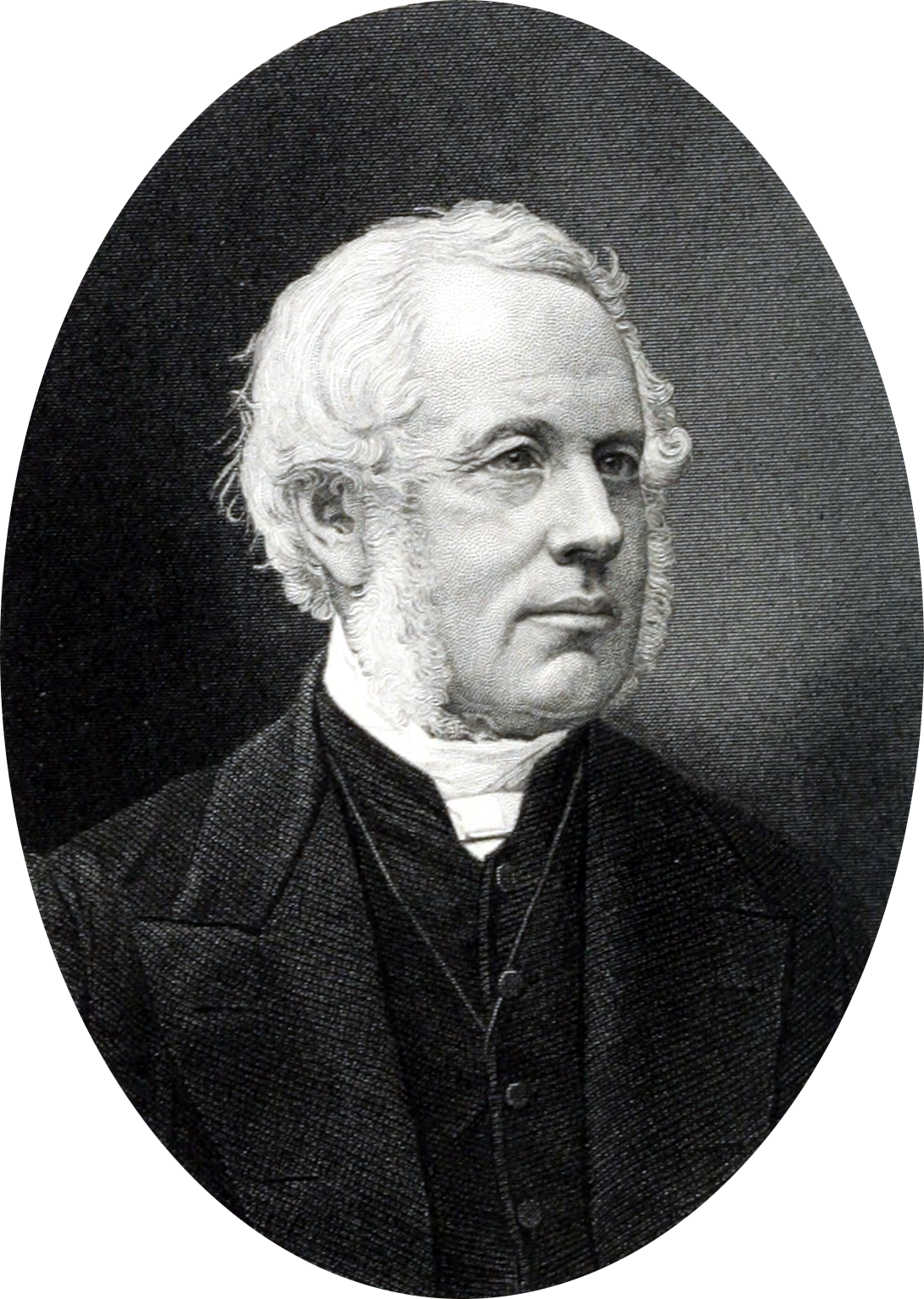
- Church: Free Church of Scotland
- In office: 1860–1861
- Predecessor: William Cunningham
- Successor: Robert Smith Candlish

Personal details
- Born: 15 August 1802 St. Ninians, Stirlingshire, Scotland
- Died: 30 or 31 March 1875 (aged 72) Rome, Italy
- Spouse: Anne Handyside (m. 1828; died 1841) Elizabeth (m. 1843)
- Children: 10
- Occupation: Minister; historian
- Education: Glasgow University

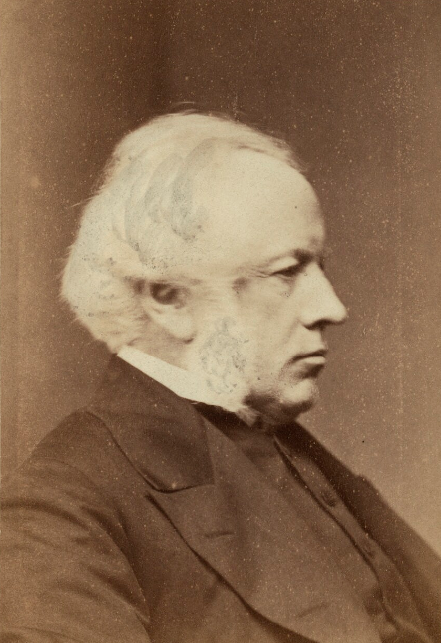
Robert Buchanan, by Thomas Annan

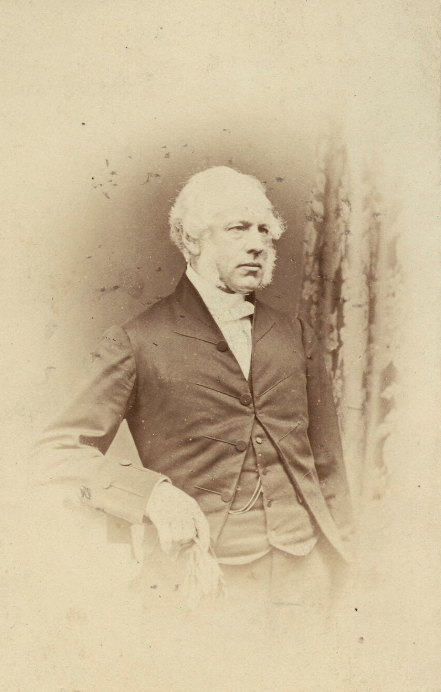
Robert Buchanan by John Moffat

Robert Buchanan (15 August 1802 – 30/31 March 1875) was a Scottish Presbyterian minister and historian who served as Moderator of the General Assembly to the Free Church of Scotland in 1860/61. He was one of the leading figures in the Disruption of 1843.

He had correspondence with several notable figures of the day over many years: Lord Aberdeen; Sir Robert Peel; Thomas Chalmers from 1834 to 1845; and George Combe from 1821 to 1827.

== Early life and education ==
He was born on 15 August 1802 at St Ninian's, a small district in the east of Stirling in central Scotland. He was the son of Alexander Buchanan, a brewer and farmer, and his wife, Margaret Wingate. He studied divinity at Glasgow University.

== Career ==
He was ordained in the Church of Scotland in 1826 in Gargunnock and translated in 1829 to Saltoun in East Lothian, replacing Rev Dr Gilbert Burnet. In 1833 he moved to the Tron Kirk in Glasgow. He then lived at 2 Richmond Street.

Working from the base created by his predecessor, Thomas Chalmers he did much "home mission" work in Glasgow and expanded the church into the poorer areas such as "The Wynds" of old Glasgow.

In 1838, Buchanan chaired the debate on the "Auchterarder question", regarding the ability of a congregation to refuse a minister proposed by the local patron. This debate was the beginning of the schism which eventually led to the Disruption of 1843. In this. Buchanan stood at the side of Chalmers and was part of the heated debate. The church split in two and he was thereafter a minister of the Free Church of Scotland.

In 1857 he transferred to the Free College Church College on Lynedoch Street.

In 1860 he succeeded William Cunningham as Moderator of the General Assembly, the highest position in the Free Church. He was succeeded in turn in 1861 by Robert Smith Candlish.

From 1863 to 1873 he presided over the committee looking at the potential union of the Free Church with the United Presbyterian Church, the Reformed Presbyterian Church and the Presbyterian Church of England, all being doctrinally similar. Although these talks were unsuccessful, large sections did merge in 1900. From 1872 until death he was an active member of the Glasgow School Board.

== Death ==
He was invited to speak at the Scottish Church in Rome, Italy in February 1875. He fell ill during this trip and died in Rome during the night of 30/31 March 1875. His body was returned to Glasgow for burial.

== Artistic recognition ==
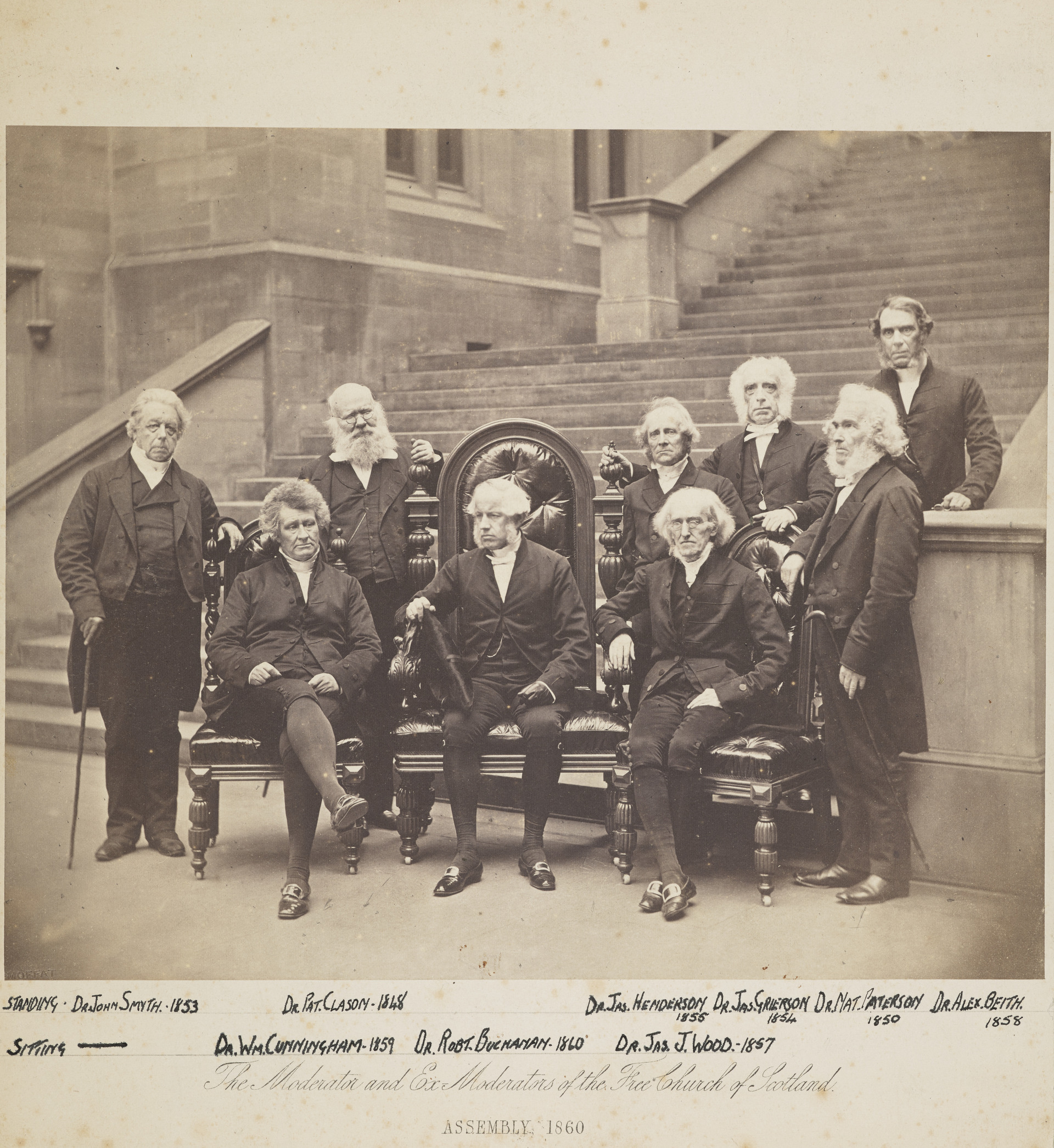
The Moderator and Ex Moderators of the Free Church of Scotland, Assembly; 1860. Pictured, from left to right, are (standing) John Smyth, Patrick Clason, James Henderson, James Grierson, Nathaniel Paterson and Alexander Beith (behind); (seated) William Cunningham, Buchanan and James Julius Wood.

He was photographed when he was Moderator in 1860 (illustrated right) at the foot of the steps to New College with several ex-Moderators of the Free Church.

He was portrayed by James Armytage.

== Personal life ==
He married Anne Handyside on 5 March 1828 and she died 29 April 1841. They had six children. He married Elizabeth, daughter of Laurence Stoddart, Cambridge, on 31 October 1843 and she died on 28 April 1898. They had four children.

== Publications ==
- Speech in General Assembly (Glasgow, 1838)
- God to be obeyed rather than Man, a discourse (Glasgow, 1839)
- The Presbyteries of the Church threatened with Imprisonment in the discharge of their Official Duty (Glasgow, 1839)
- A Discourse after the Funeral of Mrs. Alexander of Ballochmyle (Glasgow, 1843)
- A Discourse after the Funeral of Claud Alexander of Ballochmyle (Glasgow, 1845)
- The Ten Years' Conflict, 2 vols. (Edinburgh, 1849)
- The Schoolmaster in the Wynds, or how to Educate the Masses (Glasgow, 1850)
- Notes of a Clerical Furlough (London, 1859)
- The Book of Ecclesiastes (London, 1859)
- Present State of the Union Question (Edinburgh)
- Lectures I. (To Young Men)
- IV. (On the Evidences)
- V. (On the Jews)
- Sermon XLIX. (Free Church Pulpit).
