= James Grierson (minister, born 1791) =

Scottish minister

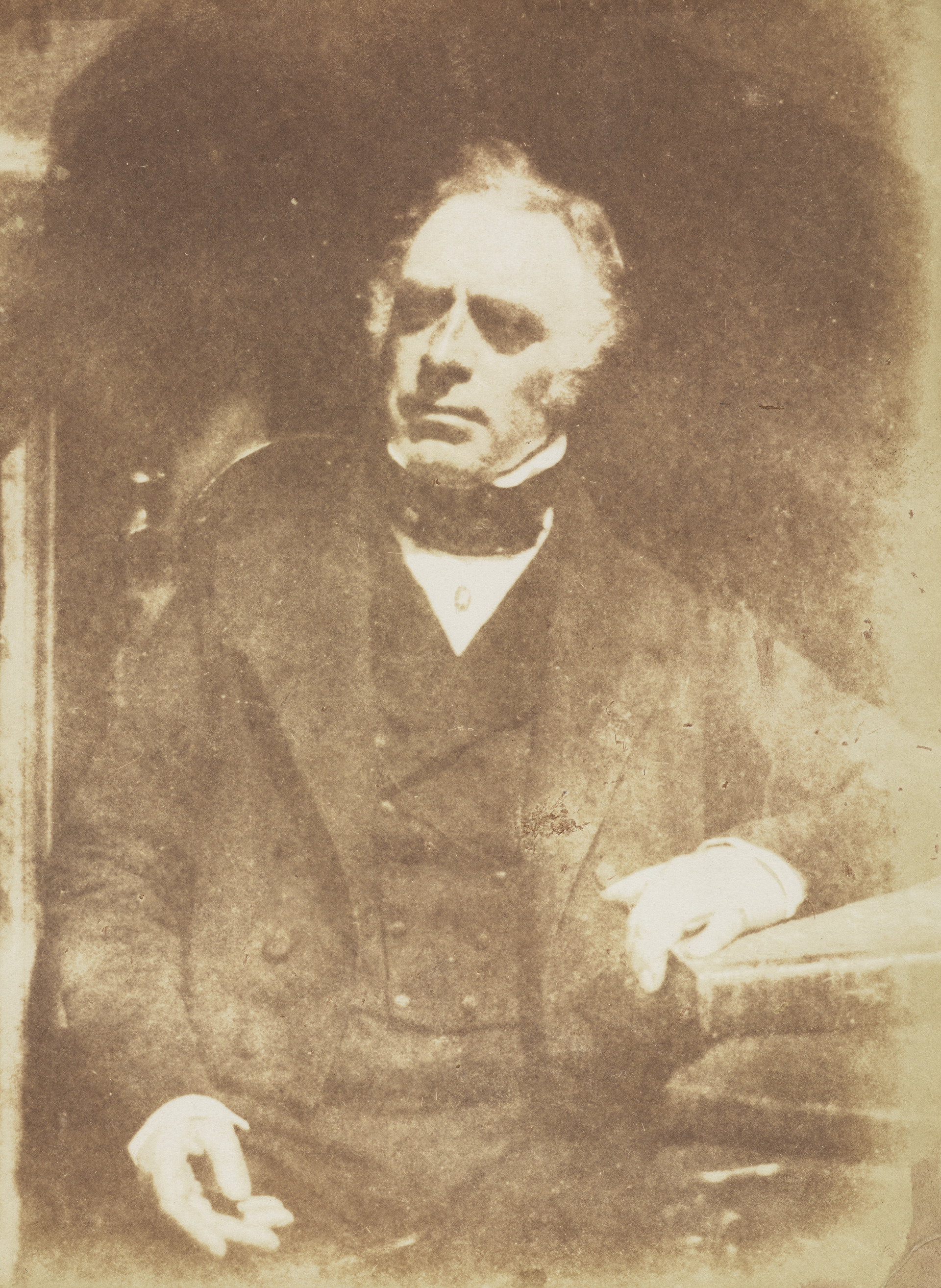
- Church: Errol

Personal details
- Born: 2 July 1791
- Died: 22 January 1875 (aged 83)

James Grierson (2 July 1791–22 January 1875) was a Scottish minister who served as Moderator of the General Assembly to the Free Church of Scotland in 1854/55.

== Early life ==
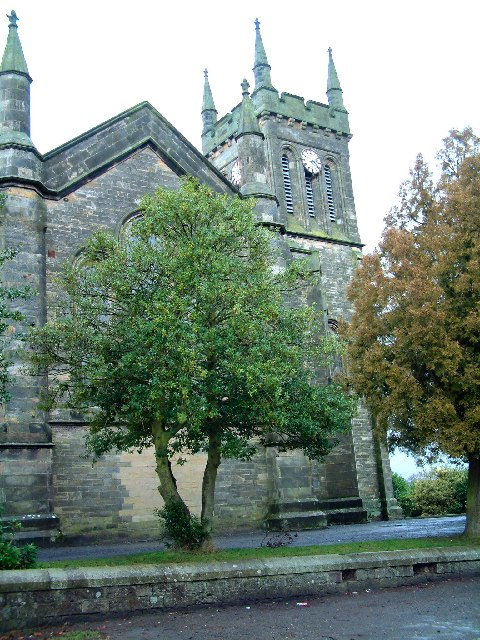
Errol Parish Church

He was born in Ruthwell in Dumfriesshire on 2 July 1791.

He studied divinity at the University of Edinburgh. He was licensed by Presbytery of Stirling on 22 September 1816. He subsequently became tutor to Sir David Kinloch of Gilmerton, Bart. He was presented by John Lee Allen of Errol, 15 January, and ordained on 12 August 1819.

In 1816 he was licensed to preach and began his ministry in Stirling as a minister for the Church of Scotland. In 1819 he moved to Errol and remained minister of the established church there until the Disruption of 1843.

== Post Disruption ==
In 1843 he (and the bulk of the congregation) established the Free Church of Scotland in Errol. He remained in this role until his death in 1875. He was elected as Moderator of Free Church General Assembly on 18 May 1854. He was awarded a doctorate D.D. from Edinburgh University on 25 March 1854.

He died on 22 January 1875 and is buried near his parents in Ruthwell churchyard.

== Publications ==
- A Doctrinal and Practical Treatise on the Lord's Supper
- Believers reminded of the Increasing Nearness of their Salvation (Edinburgh, 1833)
- Nicodemus, A Treatise on the Lord's Supper (Edinburgh, 1839)
- Voices from the Cross (Edinburgh, 1855)
- Heaven upon Earth, or Interviews with the Risen Saviour (Edinburgh, 1856)
- The Divine Supplicant and Intercessor (Edinburgh, 1867)
- Sermon LXIL, Lecture XXII. (Free Church Pulpit, ii., iii.).

== Bibliography ==
- The Lyons of Cossins, 73
- Annals of the Disruption
- The Evangel in Gowrie, 363.

== Artistic recognition ==
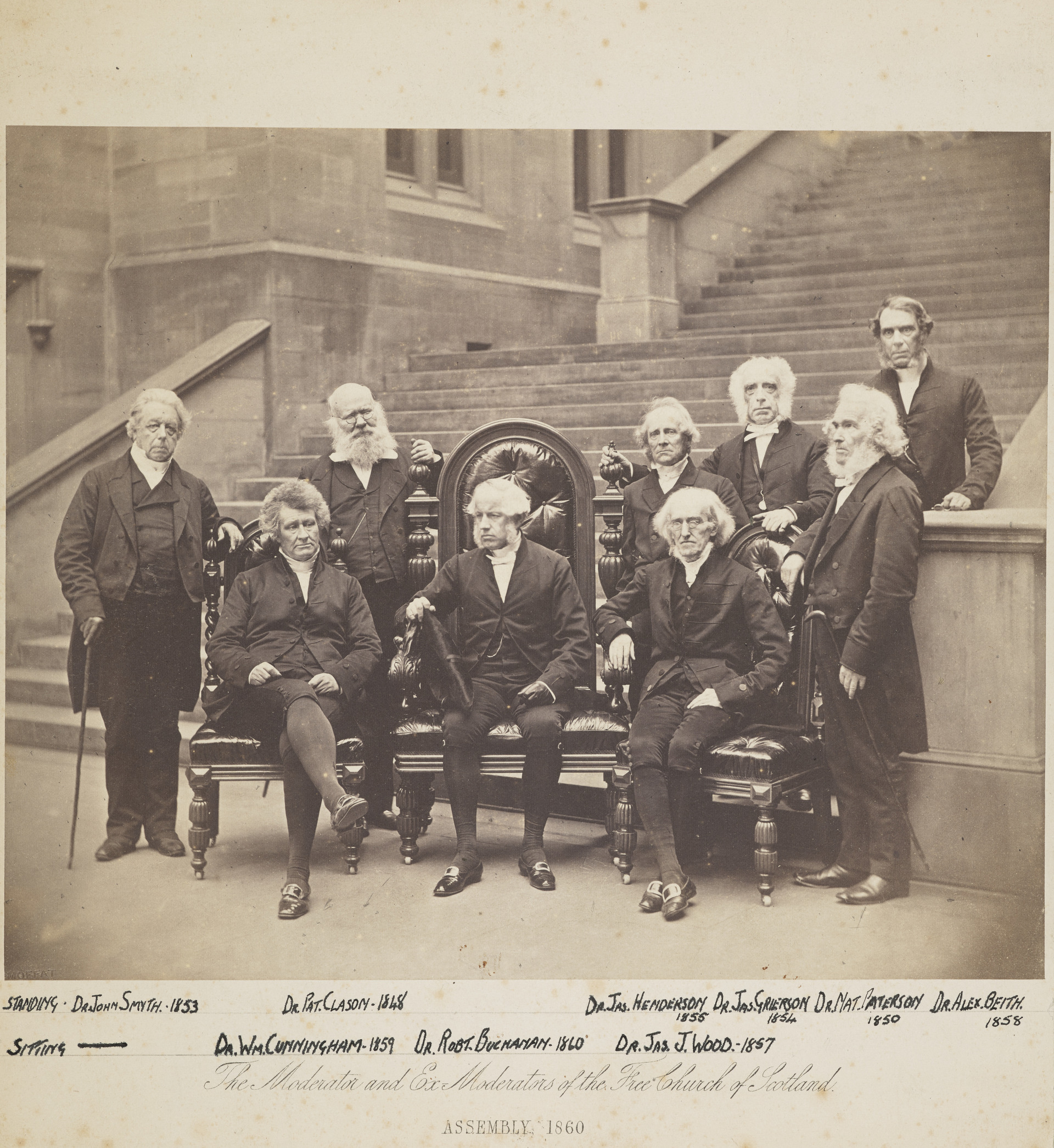
The Moderator and Ex Moderators of the Free Church of Scotland, Assembly; 1860. Pictured, from left to right, are (standing) John Smyth, Patrick Clason, James Henderson, Grierson, Nathaniel Paterson and Alexander Beith (behind); (seated) William Cunningham, Robert Buchanan and James Julius Wood.

He was photographed by Hill & Adamson in 1855. He was photographed in 1860 at the foot of the steps to New College with several other ex-Moderators of the Free Church.

== Family ==
In 1822 he married Margaret Moncrieff (died 8 April 1875), daughter of Dr George Moncrieff of Perth, and granddaughter of George Lyon of Longforgan and had seven children.
