= James Julius Wood =

Scottish minister (1800–1877)

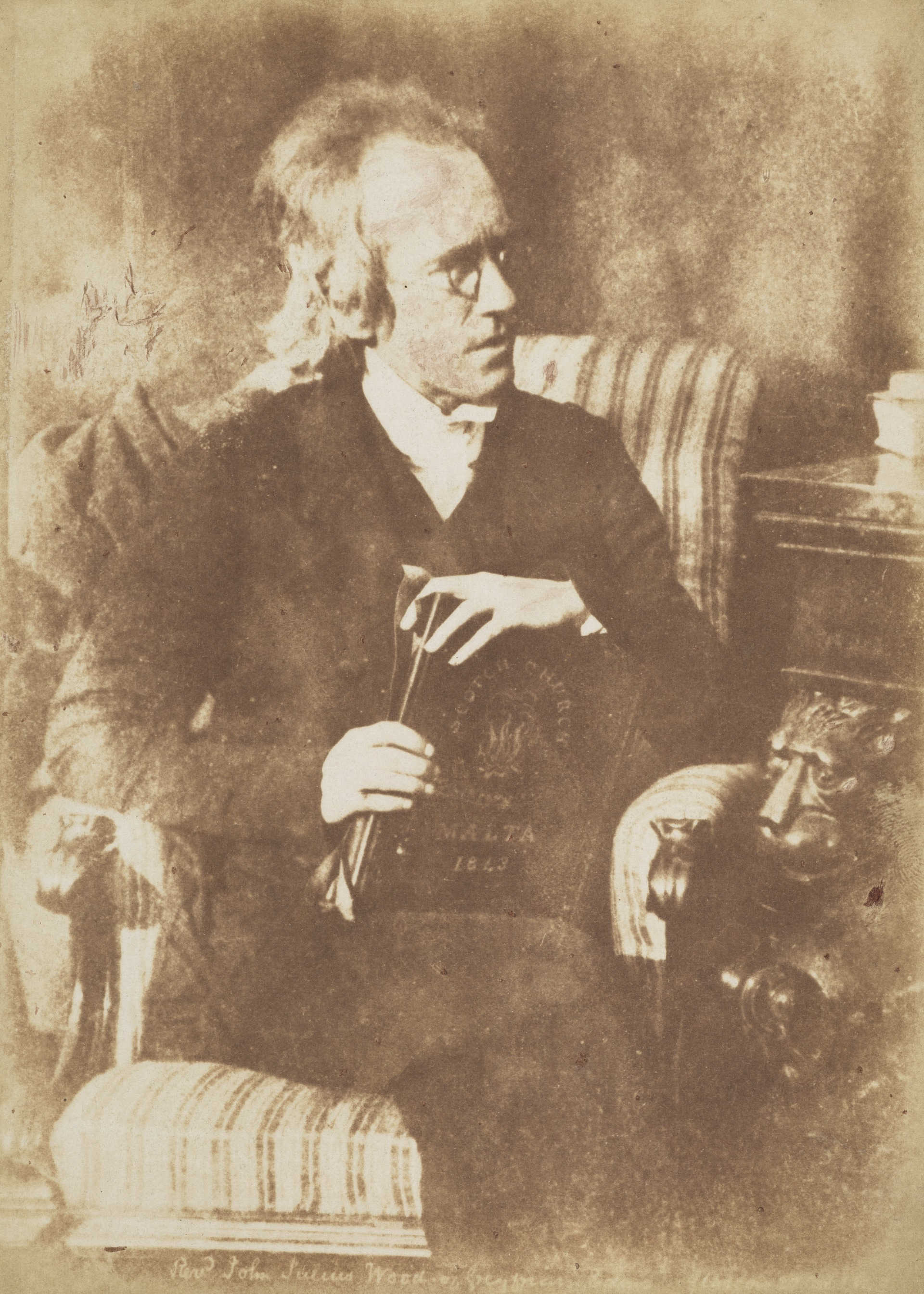
- Church: St. George’s, Dumfries Free Church (1848-1877)
- Predecessor: John R. Mackenzie
- Successor: James Freer
- Previous post: New Greyfriars’ Church (1839-1843)

Orders
- Ordination: 16 August 1827

Personal details
- Born: 4 September 1800 Jedburgh, Scotland
- Died: 27 March 1877 (aged 76) Dumfries, Edinburgh
- Denomination: Free Church of Scotland
- Spouse: Isabella Hedley
- Children: 4
- Education: Glasgow University

James Julius Wood (1800–1877) was a Scottish minister who served as Moderator of the General Assembly of the Free Church of Scotland 1857/8.

== Life ==
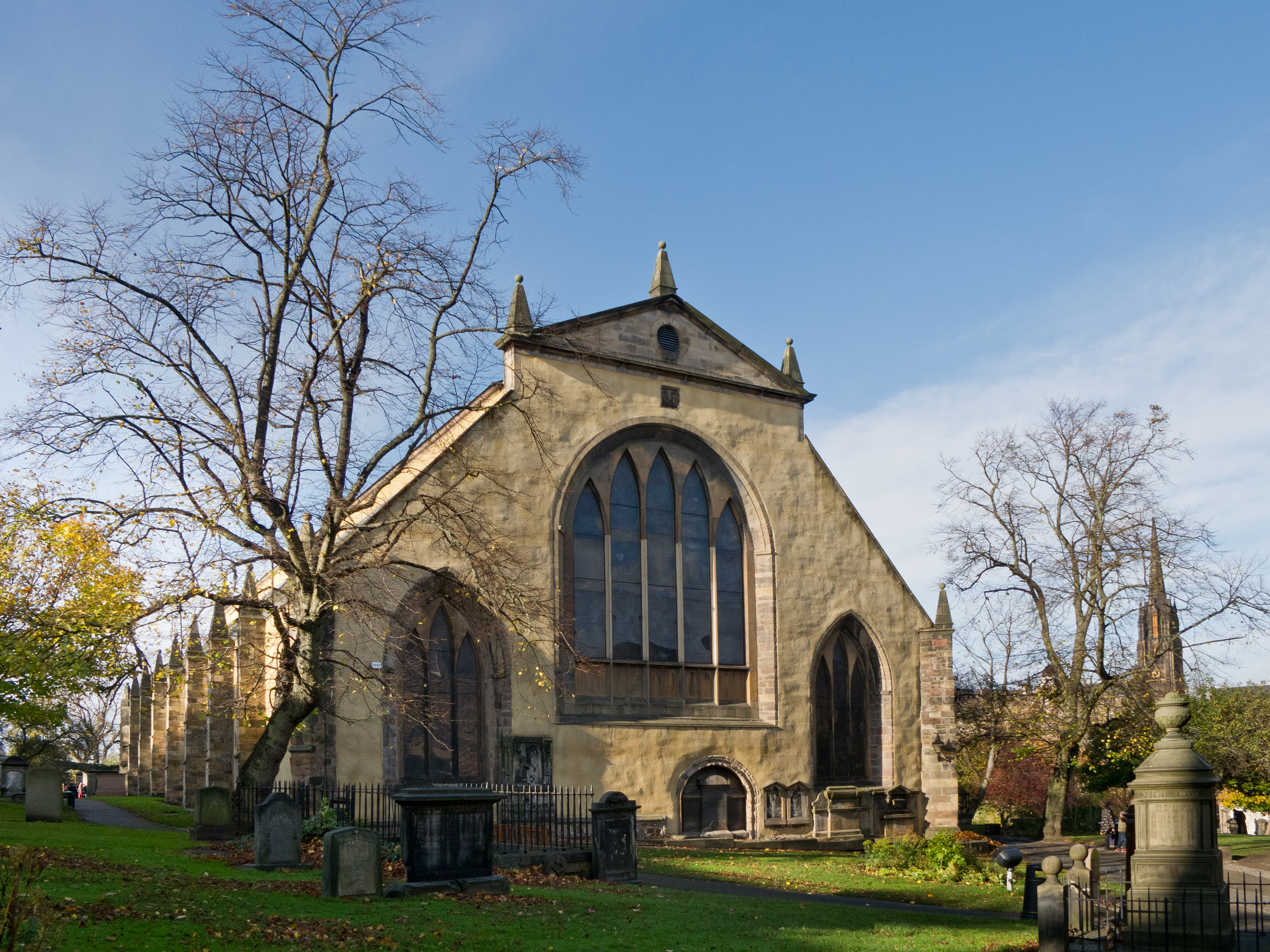
Greyfriars Kirk, Edinburgh

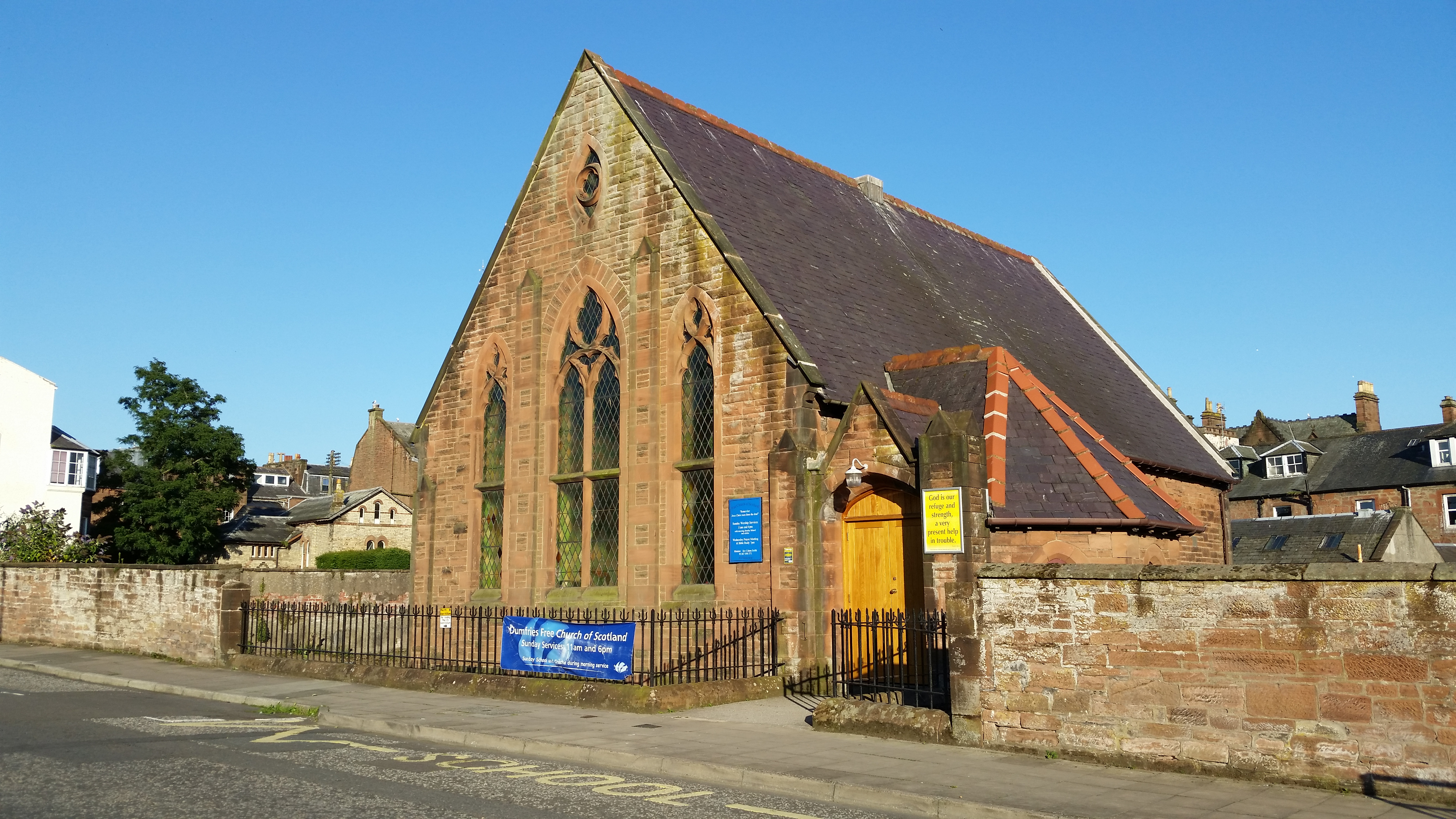
St George's Free Church, George Street, Dumfries

He was born in Jedburgh on 4 September 1800 the son of a doctor, William Wood, and his wife Isabella Hedley. He was grandson of James Wood, a minister from Calton in Edinburgh. He studied Divinity at Glasgow University graduating MA. He was licensed to preach by the Presbytery of Jedburgh in October 1825. He was ordained as a minister of the Church of Scotland at Newton-on-Ayr in 1827.

In 1836, he was translated to Stirling and in 1839 to New Greyfriars in central Edinburgh. He left the church in the Disruption of 1843 but his congregation did not follow him. He fell into ill-health and spent some years in the Mediterranean trying to improve his health with church duties in Malta and Madeira. When on leave of absence for ill-health acted as chaplain to 42nd Royal Highlanders at Malta 1842. He resided two years in Madeira, and subsequently assisted Thomas Guthrie, Patrick Clason, and others.

He returned to Scotland in 1848 to take on St George's Free Church in Dumfries, replacing Rev Mackenzie who moved to Birmingham. Dumfries was in the midst of a cholera epidemic when he arrived being inducted on 8 June 1848. The church grew until it had more than 600 communicant members. Glasgow University awarded him an honorary doctorate (Doctor of Divinity) in 1856. In 1857, he was elected Moderator of the General Assembly of the Free Church. In 1858, he was succeeded by Alexander Beith. In 1861, he was highly involved in the Revival Movement.

He died in Dumfries on 27 March 1877. Wood has a memorial stone in St. Mary’s churchyard, Dumfries.

== Family ==
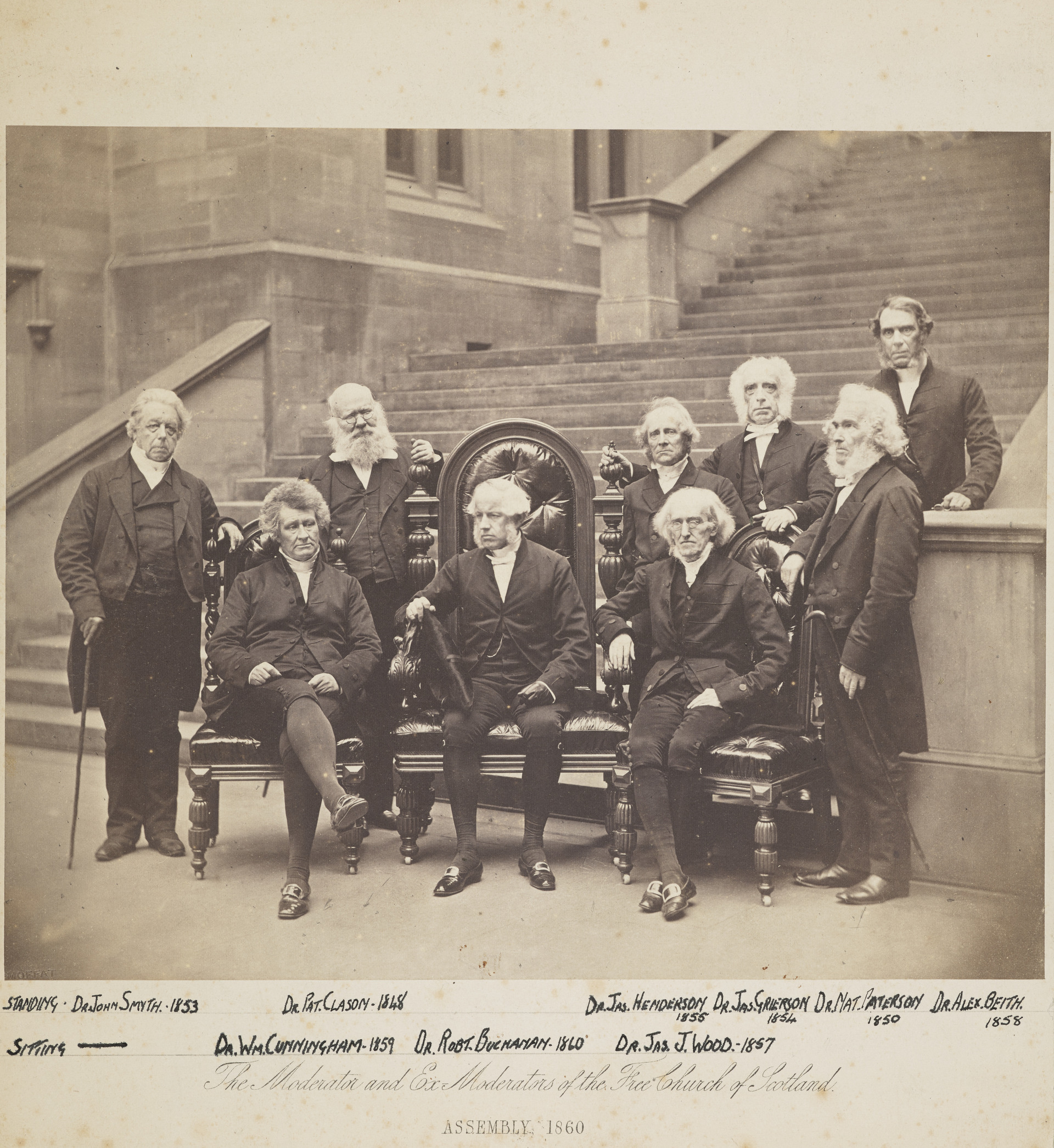
The Moderator and Ex Moderators of the Free Church of Scotland, Assembly; 1860. Pictured, from left to right, are (standing) John Smyth, Patrick Clason, James Henderson, James Grierson, Nathaniel Paterson and Alexander Beith (behind); (seated) William Cunningham, Robert Buchanan and Wood.

He married 21 October 1833, Christian Inglis (died 14 February 1886), daughter of James Henderson, (Inland Revenue), and Sophia Young, and had at least six children.

== Publications ==
- "On the Sacrifice of Fools," in The Scottish Christian Herald: Conducted under the Superintendence of Ministers and Members of the Established Church. January 6, to December 29, 1838. Vol. 3. Edinburgh: John Johnstone, 1838. pp. 772–73.
- "The Danger of Associating with the Ungodly," in The Scottish Christian Herald: Conducted under the Superintendence of Ministers and Members of the Established Church. January 5, to December 28, 1839. Vol. 1. Edinburgh: John Johnstone, 1839. pp. 456–60.
- "The First Commandment of All," in The Scottish Christian Herald: Conducted under the Superintendence of Ministers and Members of the Established Church. January 5, to December 28, 1839. Vol. 1. Edinburgh: John Johnstone, 1839. pp. 697–701.
- The beginnings of wisdom, a sermon, preached on George Heriot’s day, June 7, 1841. Edinburgh: Bell & Bradfute, 1841.
- Lecture to Young Men. Glasgow, 1842.
- Address to the Congregation of New Greyfriars, on occasion of quitting the Establishment. Edinburgh: John Johnstone, 1843.
- "The Christian Warfare," in The Scottish pulpit: a series of sermons by the most eminent divines of the Scottish church, forming a complete body of practical divinity. Vol. 3 Aberdeen: G. & H. King, 1845. pp. 392–96.
- "The Name of God Revealed by Himself," in The Scottish pulpit: a series of sermons by the most eminent divines of the Scottish church, forming a complete body of practical divinity. Vol. 5. Aberdeen: G. & H. King, 1845. pp. 265–73.
- "Notes on Madeira". A series of 7 articles from 1846: 1st, 2nd, 3rd, 4th, 5th, 6th, 7th
- "Dr Kalley's Imprisonment and Labours," in The Christian treasury : containing contributions from ministers and members of various evangelical denominations. Edinburgh: John Johnstone, 1846. pp. 505–07.
- "Shameful persecutions of the converted Portuguese," in The Christian treasury : containing contributions from ministers and members of various evangelical denominations. Edinburgh: John Johnstone, 1846. pp. 523–26.
- "The minister's New Year's salutation," in The Christian treasury : containing contributions from ministers and members of various evangelical denominations. Edinburgh: John Johnstone, 1846. pp. 529–31.
- "Help, Lord, for the Godly man ceaseth" : a sermon preached in the Territorial Church, West Port Edinburgh on Thursday the 1st July 1847, on occasion of the ordination of the Rev. William Tasker as the pastor of that church, together with charges to minister and congregation. Edinburgh: John D. Lowe, 1847.
- Hear Ye the Rod: A Tract for the Times. Dumfries: J. G. Montgomery and Co., 1849.
- Letters to Rev Henry Small. 1853.
- The Spirit of Life: Or, the Way and End of the Christian Ministry. A Closing Address Delivered to the General Assembly of the Free Church of Scotland. Edinburgh: W. P. Kennedy, 1857.
- Report on the State of Religion: Submitted to the General Assembly on 28th May 1861.Edinburgh: John Greig and son, 1861.
- "Lectures XIII, On the importance of knowledge when made subservient to man’s highest interests," in Lectures to Young Men. Vol.2. Glasgow & London: William Collins, Sons, & Co, 1865. pp. 7–20.
- Speeches Delivered at a Meeting of Free Church Office-bearers: Held on the Evening of 3d March 1870, in the Large Hall of the Religious Institution Rooms, Glasgow. Edinburgh: James Nichol, 1870.
- Doctrine and the union question. Edinburgh: John Maclaren, 1870.
- Our Father's House of Many Mansions: A Sermon Preached in the Free Church, Corsock, on September 11, 1870, the Sabbath After the Funeral of Alexander Colquhoun Stirling Murray Dunlop, Esq. of Corsock. Edinburgh: printed for private circulation, 1870.
- The Question of Doctrine in Connexion with the Negotiations for Union Between the Free and United Presbyterian Churches: A Tract for the Circumstances. Edinburgh: Ballantyne & Co., 1870.
- God’s own testimony to prayer, the prayers of the Holy Scriptures, and the answers thereto. Edinburgh: MacLaren & MacNiven, 1874.

== Artistic recognition ==
He was photographed by Hill & Adamson in 1857. St George's church website reports "In April 1870, a photograph was taken of Dr. Wood, aged 70 years, surrounded by his elders and deacons. Each person can be identified by name and in most cases, his occupation. This remarkable photograph hangs in St. George’s today"

In 1860, he was photographed with other ex-moderators at the steps of New College, Edinburgh.
