= John Smyth (minister) =

Scottish minister (1796–1860)

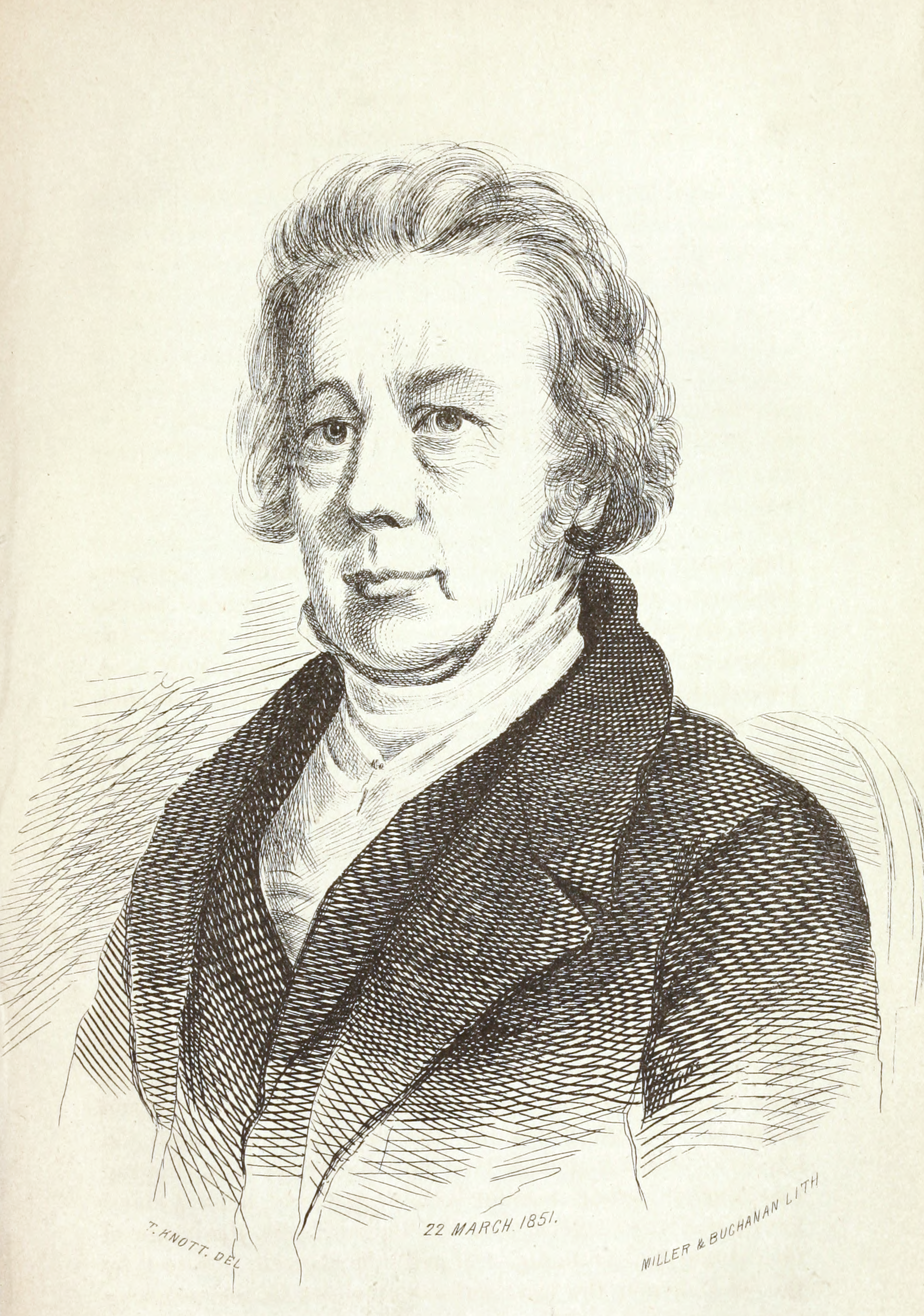
- Church: Free St. George's, Glasgow

Personal details
- Born: 1796
- Died: 1860 (aged 63–64)

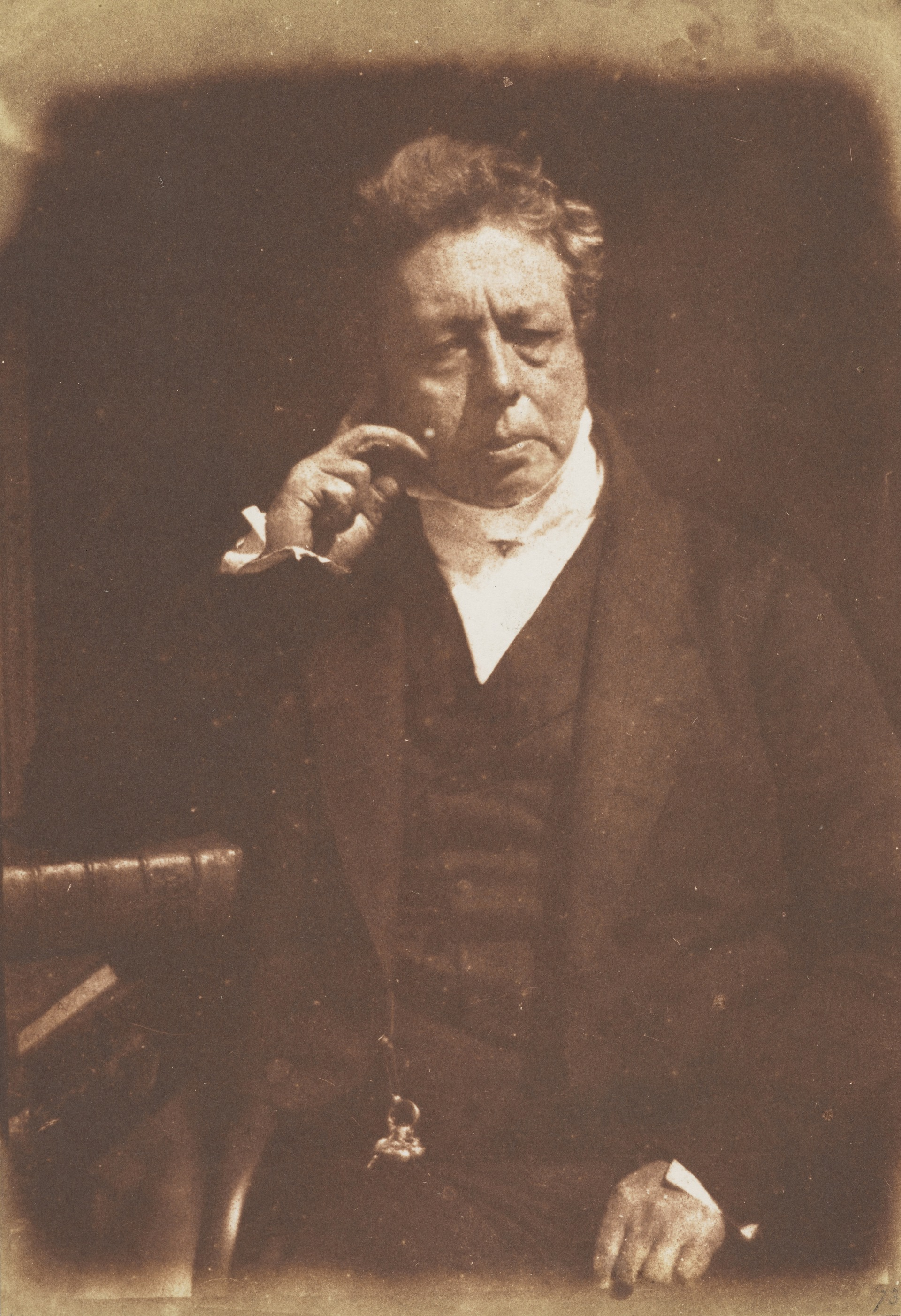
John Smyth of Free St George's by Hill and Adamson

John Smyth (1796–1860) was a Scottish minister who served as Moderator of the General Assembly for the Free Church of Scotland 1853/54.

== Early life ==
John Smyth was born in Ayr in 1796, the son of an officer in the Army. After studying divinity at the University of Edinburgh he was employed as a tutor in the family of Thomas John Fordyce of Ayton. He was licensed by the Presbytery of Chirnside on 14 August 1821. Later he became assistant minister at Canongate, Edinburgh, and to Thomas Chalmers in St John's, Glasgow. He was presented by the Magistrates and Town Council 6 December 1822 and ordained on 20 February 1823 as minister of St George's in Glasgow, living in a manse on Stirlings Road. He was awarded a doctorate in divinity D.D. by Glasgow University on 5 April 1830.

== After the Disruption ==
In the Disruption of 1843 he left the established Church of Scotland to join the Free Church of Scotland. St Georges (on Bath Street) was one instance where the entire congregation moved to the Free Church, thereby not requiring a new building.

In 1853 he succeeded Angus Makellar as Moderator. He was succeeded in turn by the James Grierson in 1854. He was then living at 17 Elmbank Place.

Smyth died in 1860. St George's was sold in 1864 and renamed St David's, with a new St George's then being built.

== Publications ==
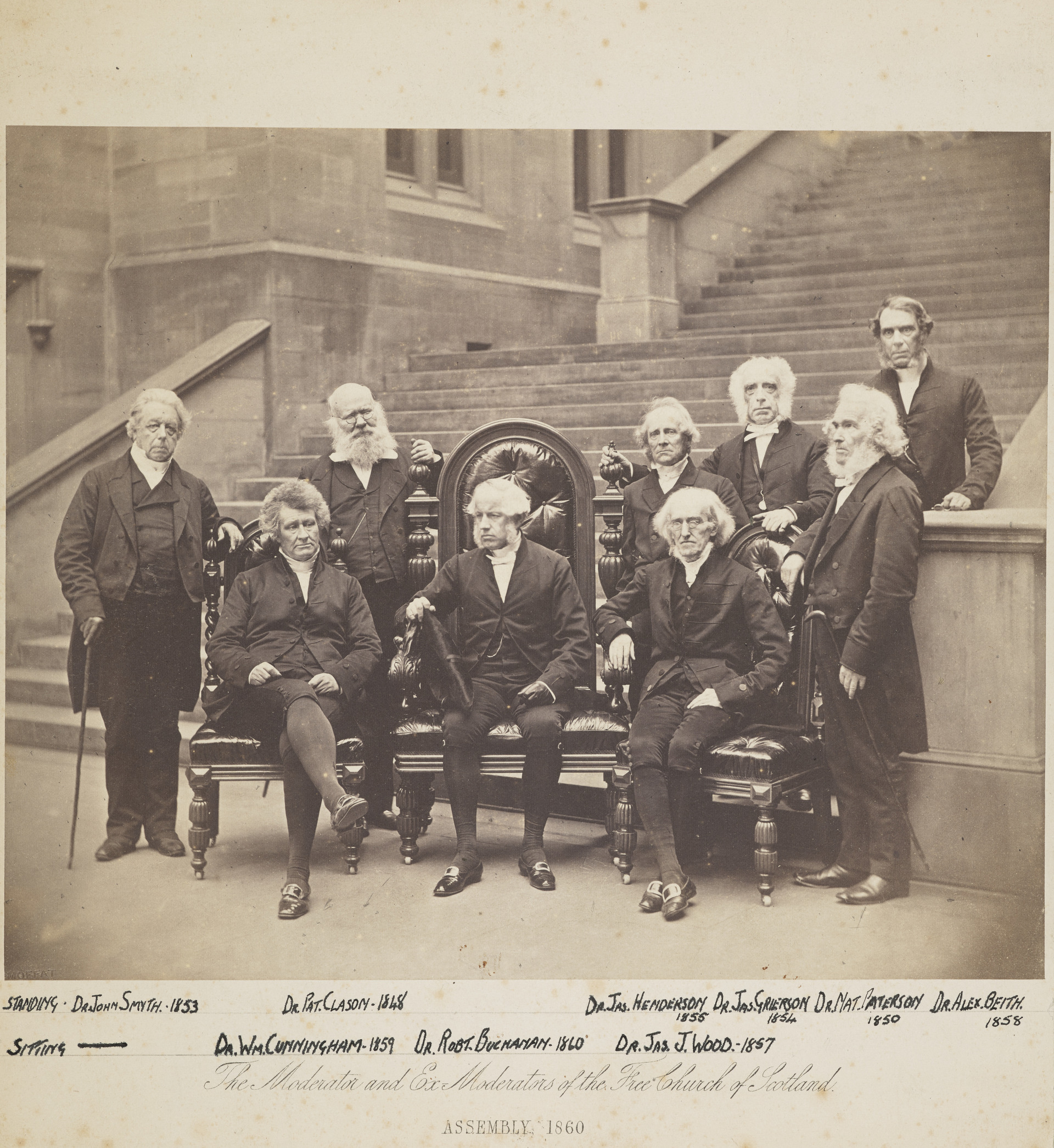
The Moderator and Ex Moderators of the Free Church of Scotland, Assembly; 1860. Pictured, from left to right, are (standing) Smyth, Patrick Clason, James Henderson, James Grierson, Nathaniel Paterson and Alexander Beith (behind); (seated) William Cunningham, Robert Buchanan and James Julius Wood.

- Three occasional Sermons (Glasgow, 1829–47)
- A Treatise on the Forgiveness of Sins (Glasgow, 1830)
- The Popish Anti-Christ, his Character and Doom (Glasgow, 1848)
- Lectures I. (On Infidelity)
- X. (On the Evidences of Revealed Religion)
- VI. (To Young Men)

== Family ==
He was twice married and had three children.

== Artistic recognition ==
He was photographed by Hill & Adamson in 1843. He was photographed in 1860 (illustrated right) at the foot of the steps to New College with several other ex-Moderators of the Free Church.
