= William Cunningham (theologian) =

Scottish theologian (1805–1861)

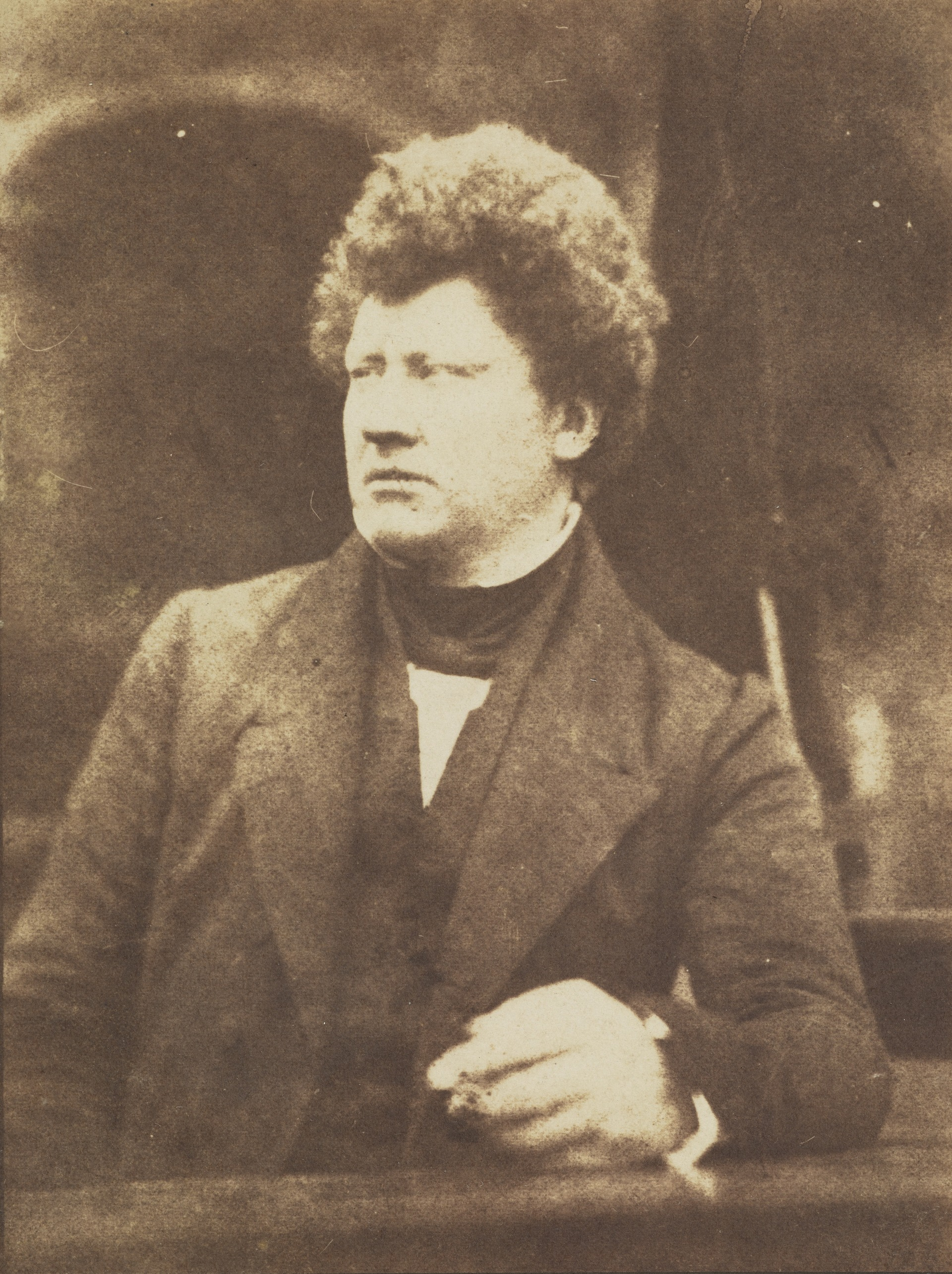
- Cunningham in 1847
- Born: 2 October 1805; Hamilton, Lanarkshire, Scotland
- Died: 14 December 1861 (aged 56); Edinburgh, Scotland
- Education: University of Edinburgh
- Occupations: Pastor; theologian
- Spouse: Janet Denniston (m. 1834)
- Children: 11
- Theological work
- Tradition or movement: Presbyterianism

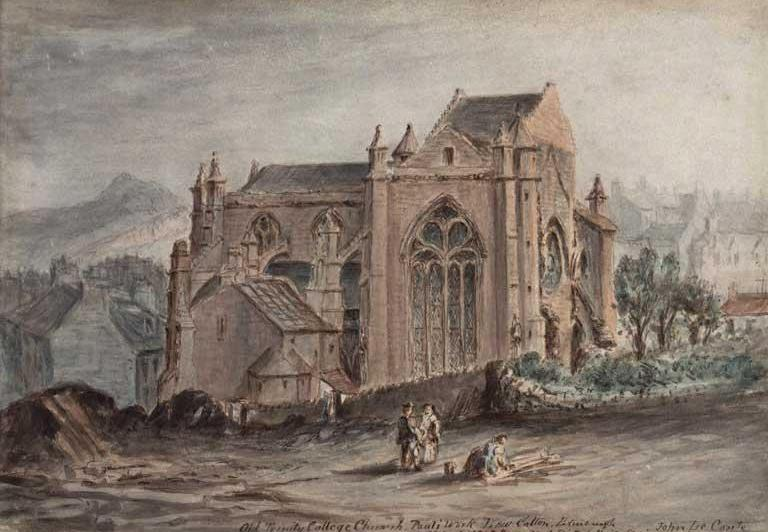
Trinity College Church in Edinburgh

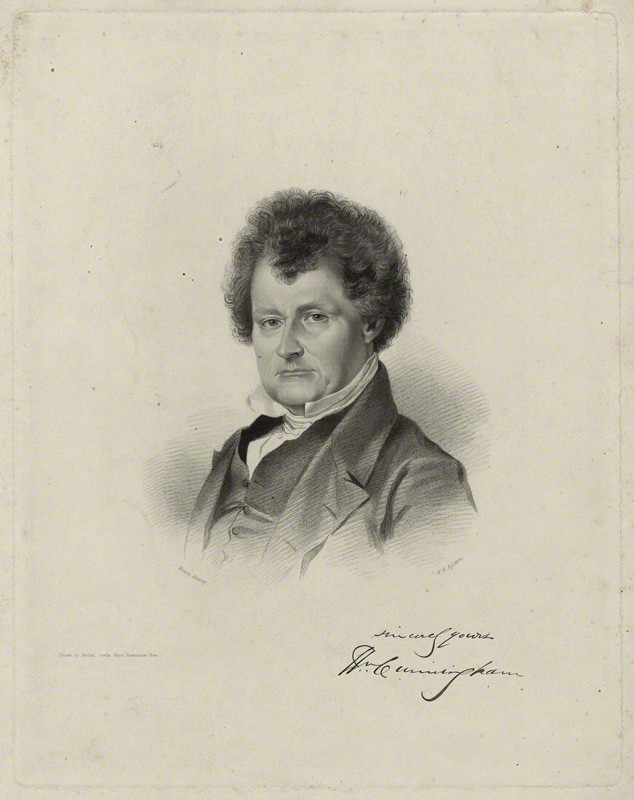

William Cunningham (2 October 1805 – 14 December 1861) was a Scottish theologian and co-founder of the Free Church of Scotland. He was Moderator of the Free Church in 1859.

== Early life and education ==
Cunningham was born in Hamilton, Lanarkshire the eldest son of Charles Cunningham a merchant and his wife Helen Cunningham. The family moved to Cheeklaw in the Scottish Borders and from there he attended Duns Academy.

He studied Divinity at the University of Edinburgh and was licensed by the Presbytery of the Church of Scotland in Duns in 1828 and was posted as assistant minister to the Middle Parish in Greenock.

== Career ==
He was ordained as minister of that church in October 1831, where he remained for three years. In January 1834 he was translated to the first charge of Trinity College Kirk in Edinburgh. This move was mis-timed inasmuch that the fate of the church was already sealed by Act of Parliament as the church was to be demolished to make way for Waverley Station.

Cunningham became a major advocate of a new Free Church and wrote extensively on the subject. Princeton University gave him an honorary doctorate (Doctor of Divinity) in 1842 in relation to his writing.

His transfer also coincided with the commencement of the period known in Scottish ecclesiastical history as the Ten Years' Conflict, and he left the Church of Scotland in the Disruption of 1843 to become one of the founders of the Free Church of Scotland, alongside Thomas Chalmers and Robert Smith Candlish.

Towards the end of 1843 he visited America to make the case for the Free Church and he raised some money there, having already received the degree of D.D. from Princeton University. Cunningham was appointed Professor of Theology at the New College, Edinburgh, before transferring to the chair of Church History in 1845, replacing David Welsh. He succeeded Thomas Chalmers as Principal in 1847, serving in that position until his death, and was appointed moderator of the Free Church General Assembly in 1859.

Cunningham specialised in historical theology, and wrote a two volume work on the subject. An open source audio narration of the book is available. He also wrote The Reformers and the Theology of the Reformation. William Garden Blaikie suggested that he was the "ablest defender of Calvinism in his day" and that the "gentleness of his personal character was a striking contrast to his boldness and vehemency in controversy." Cunningham has been described as a scholar and controversialist. According to the Encyclopædia Britannica Eleventh Edition, "his ... sympathies combined with his evident desire to be rigidly impartial qualifying him to be an interesting delineator of the more stirring periods of church history, and a skilful disentangler of the knotty points in theological polemics."

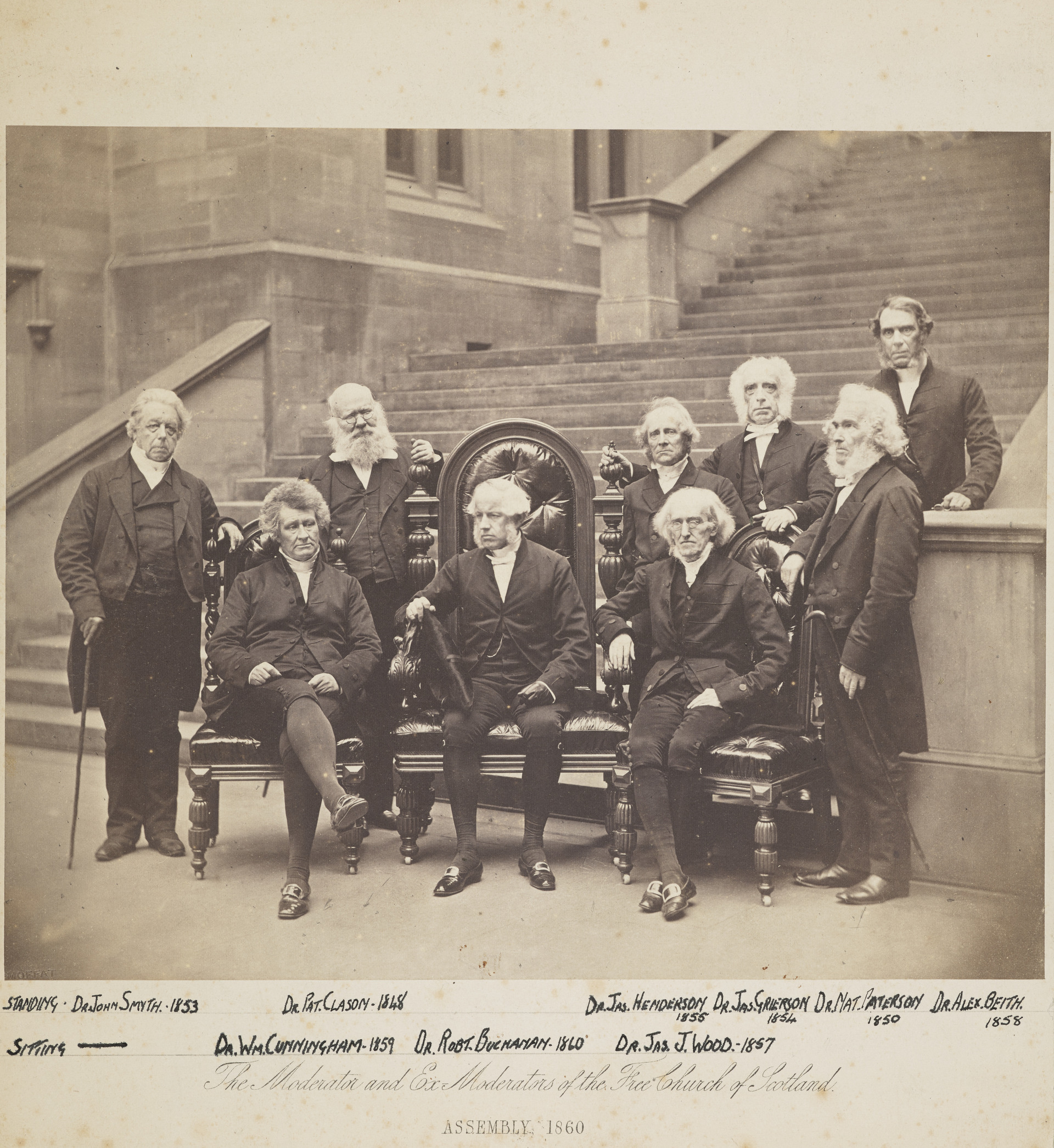
The Moderator and Ex Moderators of the Free Church of Scotland, Assembly; 1860. Pictured, from left to right, are (standing) John Smyth, Patrick Clason, James Henderson, James Grierson, Nathaniel Paterson and Alexander Beith (behind); (seated), Cunningham, Robert Buchanan and James Julius Wood.

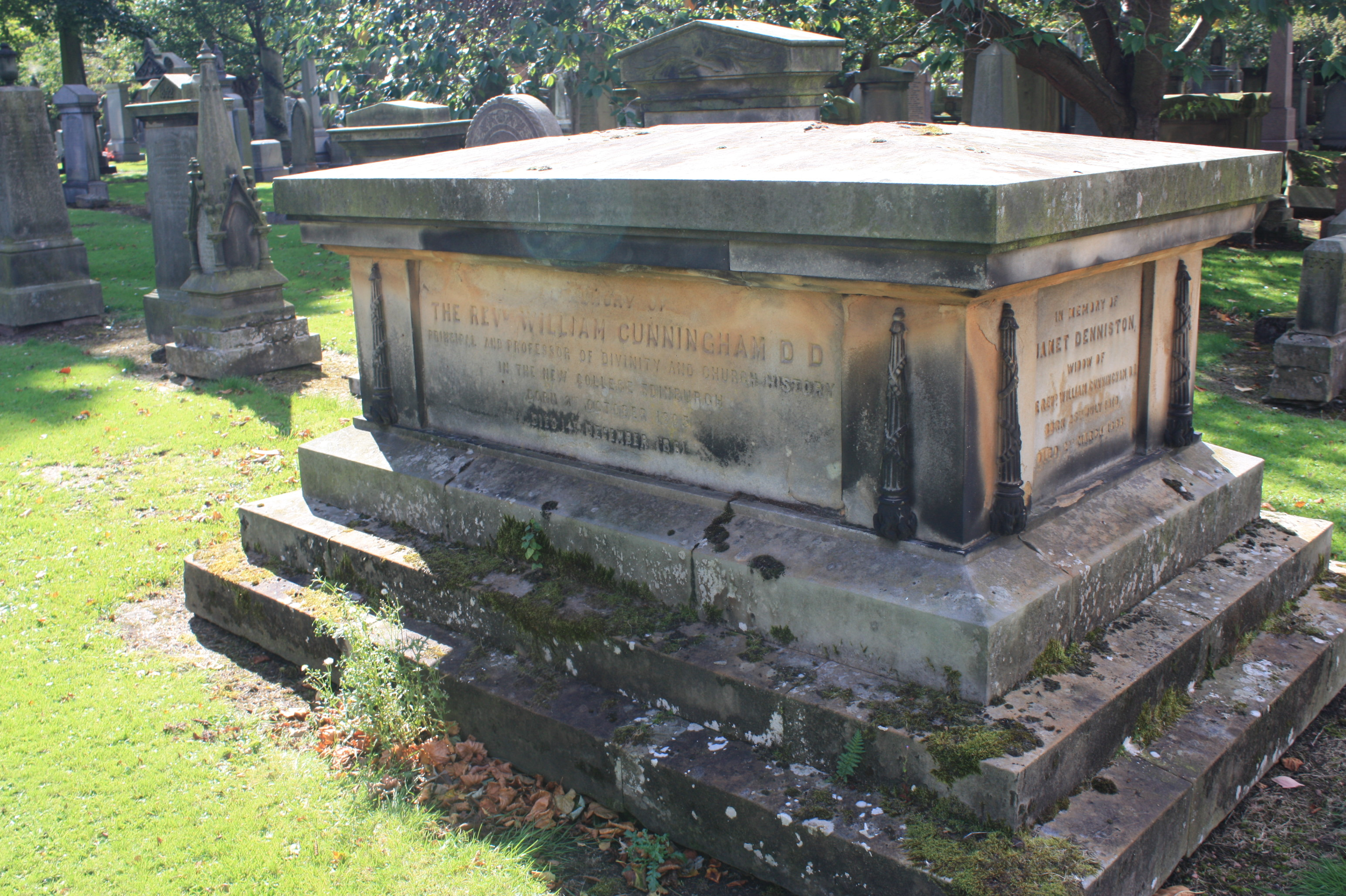
Cunningham's grave at Grange Cemetery, Edinburgh

== Personal life ==
On 15 July 1834 he married Janet Denniston (1810 – 2 March 1888) daughter of John Denniston of Greenock and Jean Fairrie, and had eleven children.

== Death and legacy ==
He died in Edinburgh on 14 December 1861 and is buried beneath a large sarcophagus-style grave in the Grange Cemetery alongside the north path.

A marble bust of Cunningham, sculpted by William Brodie stands in New College in Edinburgh.

Portraits by William Bonnar, Sir John Watson Gordon, and Edward Burton are held by the National Gallery of Scotland.

== Publications ==
- Reply to the Statement of Certain Ministers and Elders, published in Answer to Dr Chalmers 1 Conference (Edinburgh, 1837)
- Speech on the Independence of the Church (Edinburgh, 1839)
- Letter to John Hope (Edinburgh, 1839)
- Tracts On the Intrusion of Ministers (Edinburgh, 1839)
- Defence of the Rights of the Christian People in the Appointment of Ministers (Edinburgh, 1840)
- Strictures on the Rev. James Robertson's Observations upon the Veto Act (Edinburgh, 1840)
- Letters on the Church Question in Answer to Mr Robertson of Ellon (Edinburgh, 1842)
- Animadversions on Sir William Hamilton's pamphlet, "Be not Schismatics," etc. (Edinburgh, 1843)
- edited Bruce : s Sermons and Life (Edinburgh, 1843)
- Introduction and Notes to Stillingfleet's Doctrines and Practices of the Church of Rome (1845)
- The Unchangeableness of Christ, a sermon (Edinburgh, 1853)
- The Reformers, and the Theology of the Reformation (Edinburgh, 1862)
- Historical Theology, 2 vols. (Edinburgh, 1863)
- Discussions on Church Principles, 2 vols. (Edinburgh, 1863 )
- Sermons, edited by J. J. Bonar (1872)
- Theological Lectures, edited by Thomas Smith, D.D. (1878)
