= James Henderson (moderator) =

Scottish minister

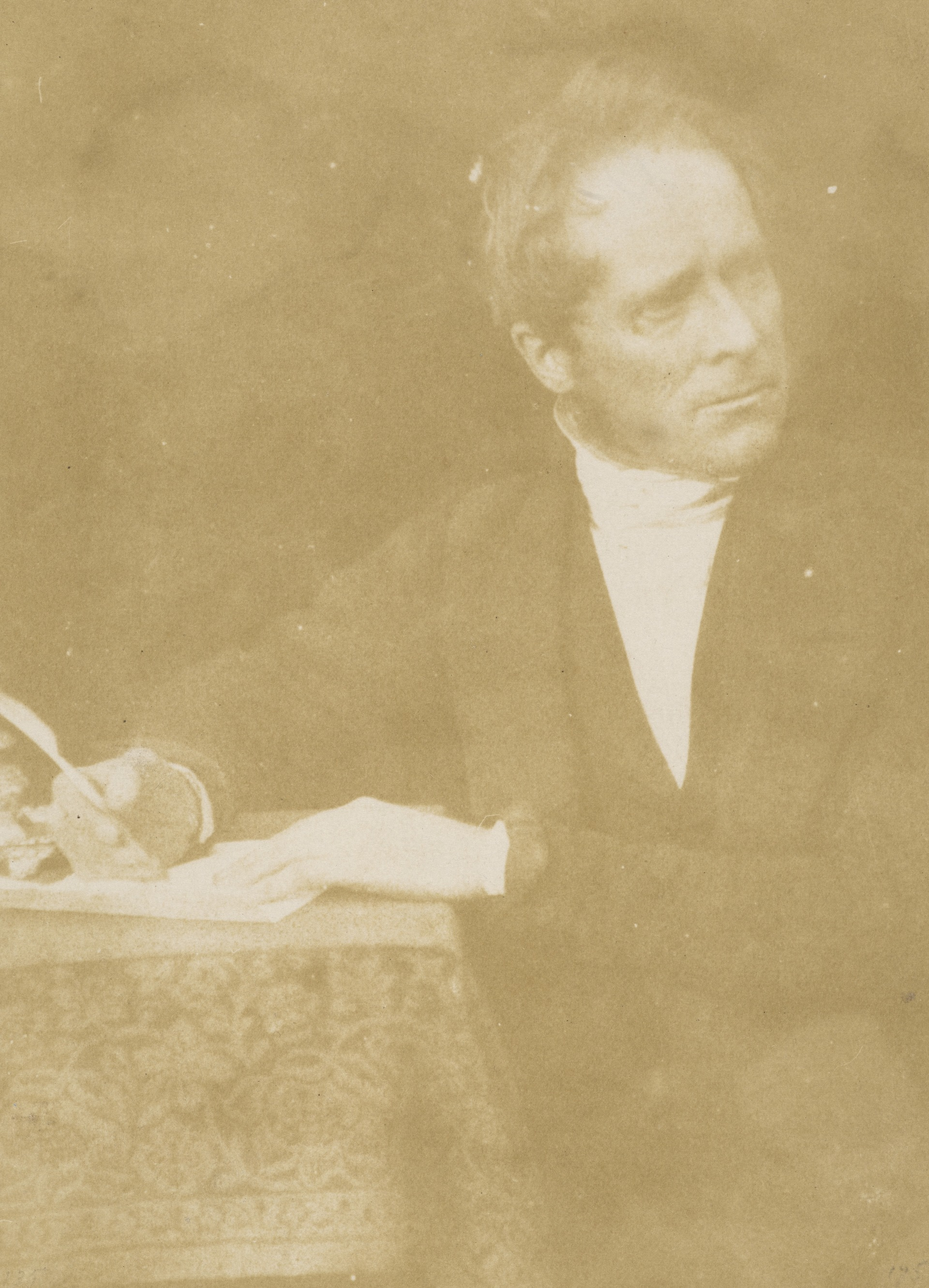
- Church: Glasgow, St Enoch's

Personal details
- Born: 1797
- Died: 12 September 1874 (aged 76–77)

James Henderson (1797 – 12 September 1874) was a Scottish minister of the Free Church of Scotland who served as Moderator of the General Assembly to the Free Church 1855/56.

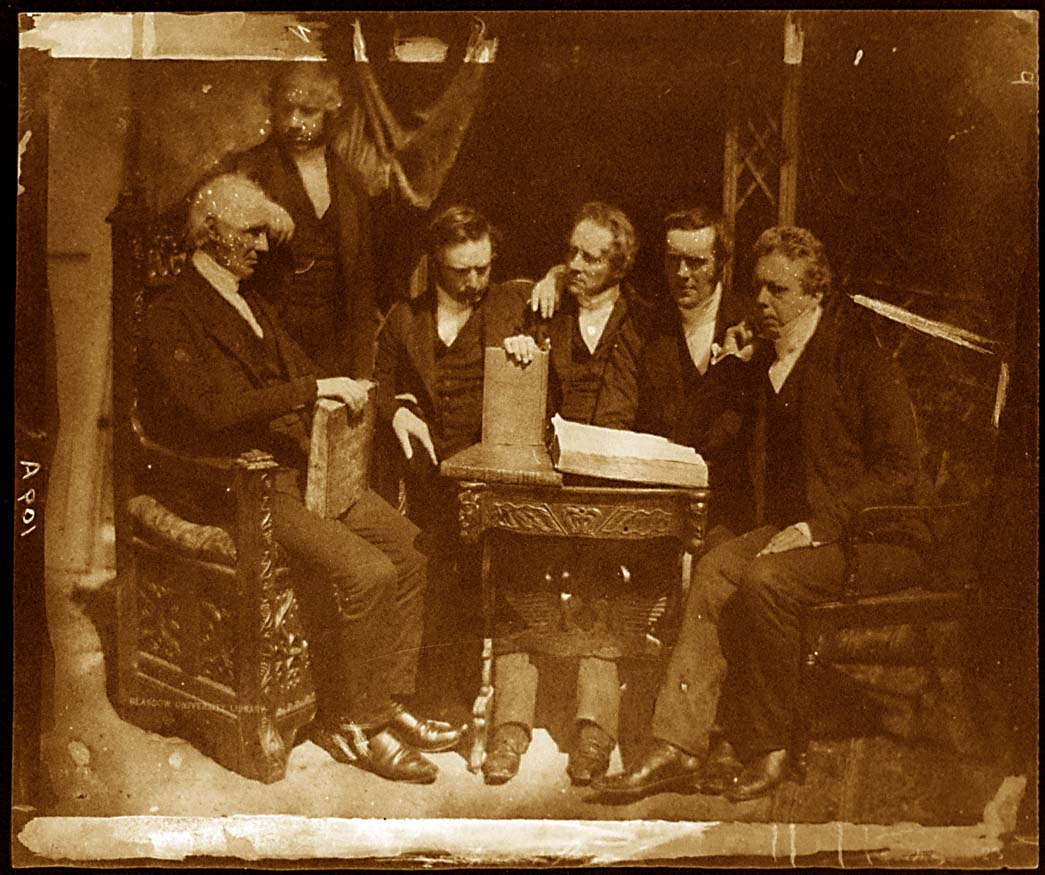
Glasgow Free Churchmen - of the six, two have not been identified. Robert James Brown, James Henderson, Rev John Forbes, Rev John Smith

== Early life and ministry ==
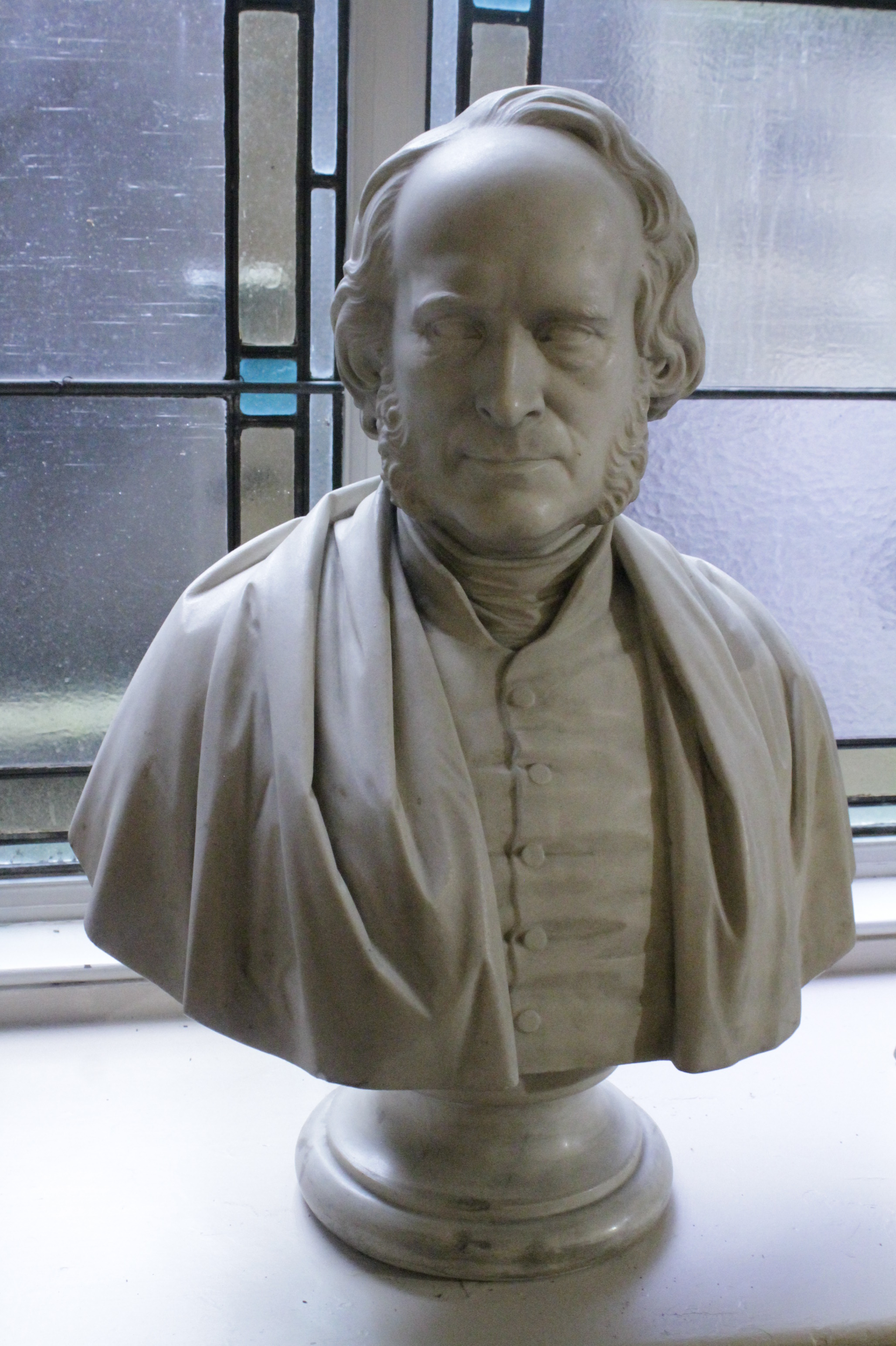
Marble bust of Henderson in Stockbridge Parish Church

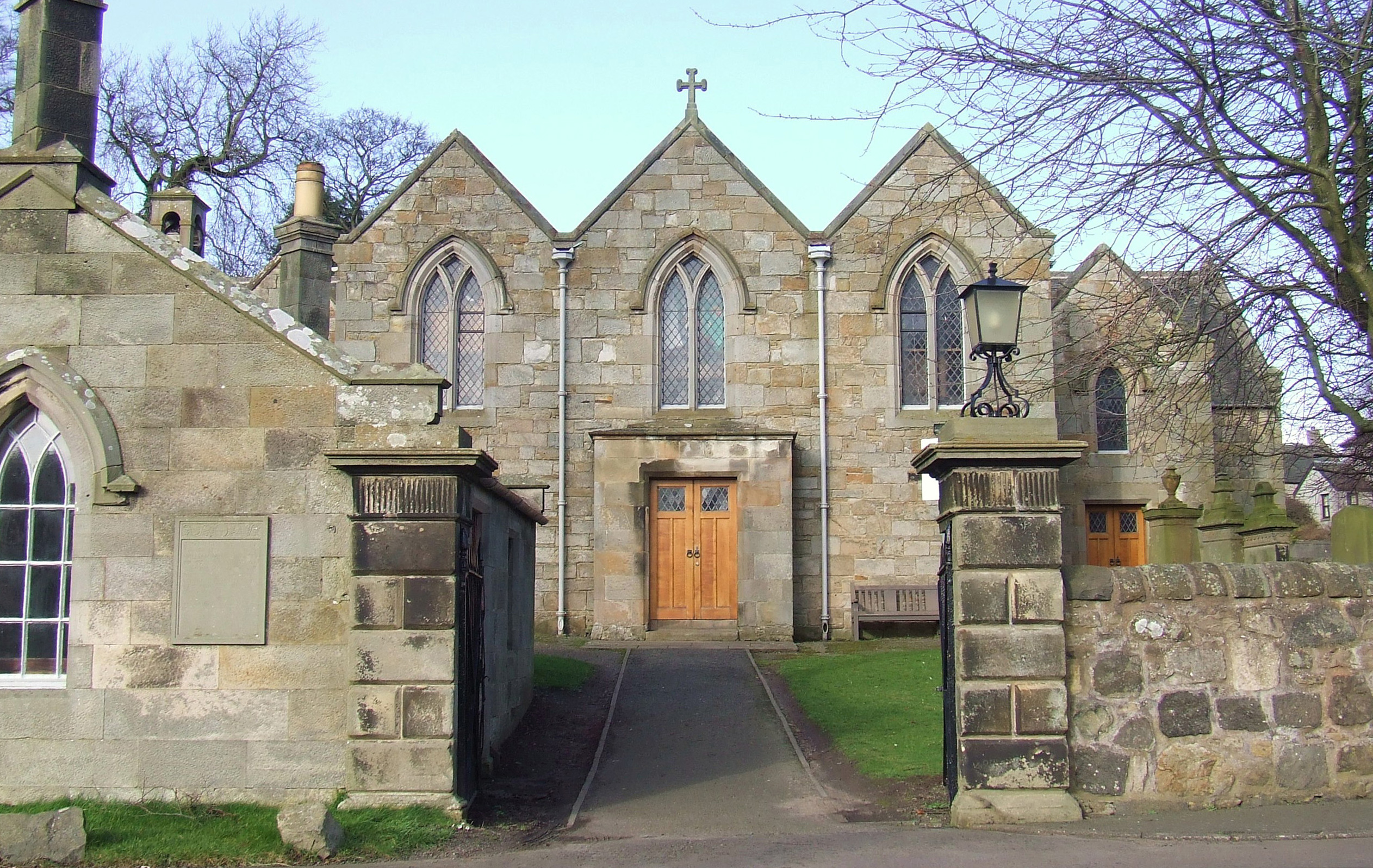
Ratho kirk

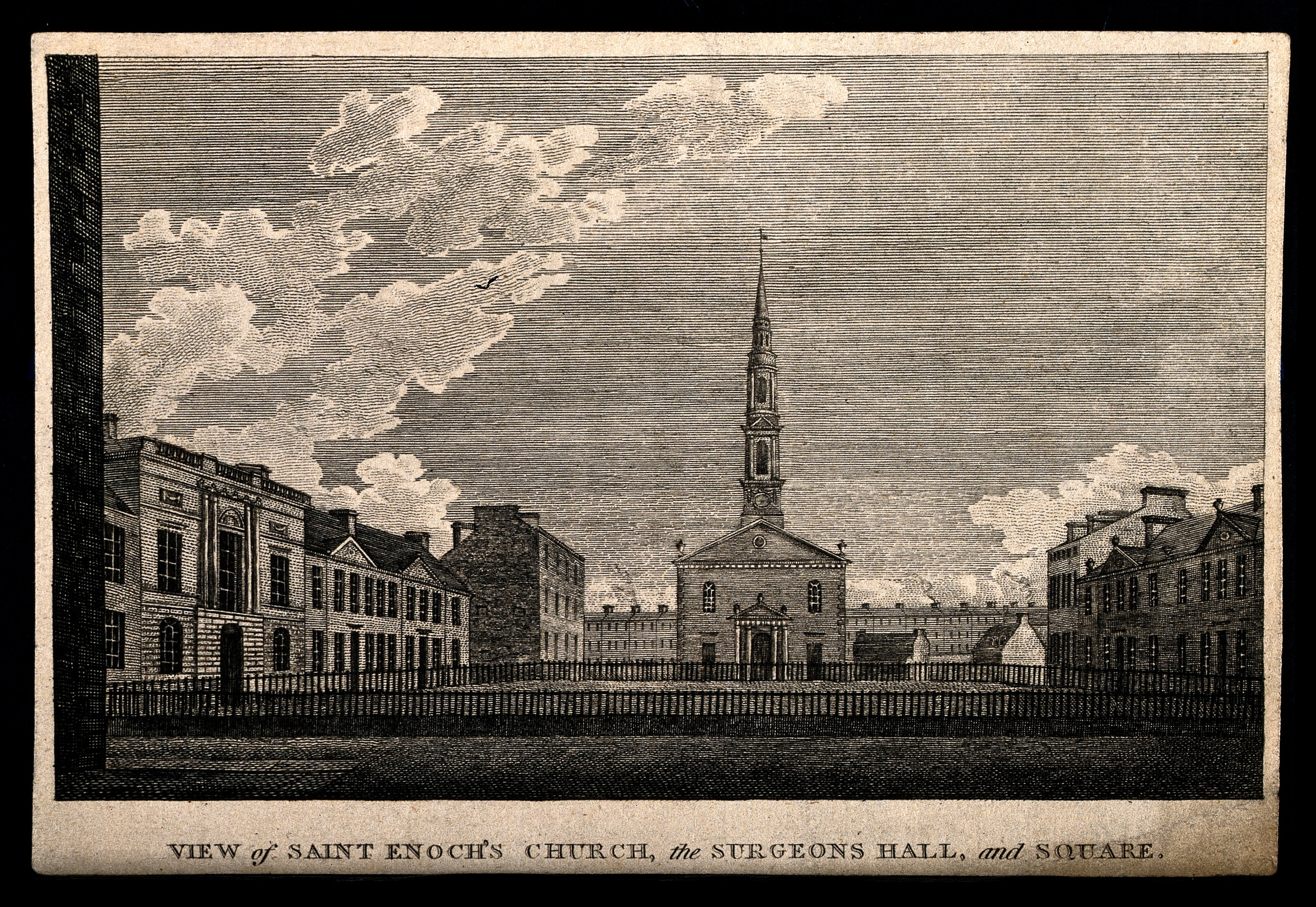
St Enoch's Church in Glasgow

Henderson was born in Kelso on 4 February 1797 and was educated at Kelso Grammar School. He studied divinity at the University of Edinburgh. Then he studied under George Lawson at Selkirk Divinity Hall. After examination he was licensed by Presbytery of Selkirk.

He was ordained by the by Presbytery of Kelso, on 4 September 1821, to the Low Meeting, Berwick-upon-Tweed. On 27 November 1823 he translated to St Bernard's Church in Stockbridge, Edinburgh. On 21 February 1828 translated to Ratho Kirk. He lived in Ratho manse.

In 1832 he moved to St Enoch's Church in Glasgow, being presented by the Magistrates and Council 29 August, and admitted 29 November 1832. He was awarded a doctorate D.D. by Glasgow University in 1837.

== After the Disruption ==
In the Disruption of 1843 he left the Church of Scotland and joined the Free Church of Scotland. He was minister of St Enoch's Free Church from 1843-1874. A St Enoch's Free Church was built on Waterloo Street in Glasgow. He also played a role in the wider church being convener of the Foreign Mission Scheme of the Free Church. In 1855 he succeeded James Grierson as Moderator of the General Assembly the highest position in the church. In 1856 he was succeeded in turn by Thomas M'Crie.

He died in North Berwick on 12 September 1874.

== Family ==
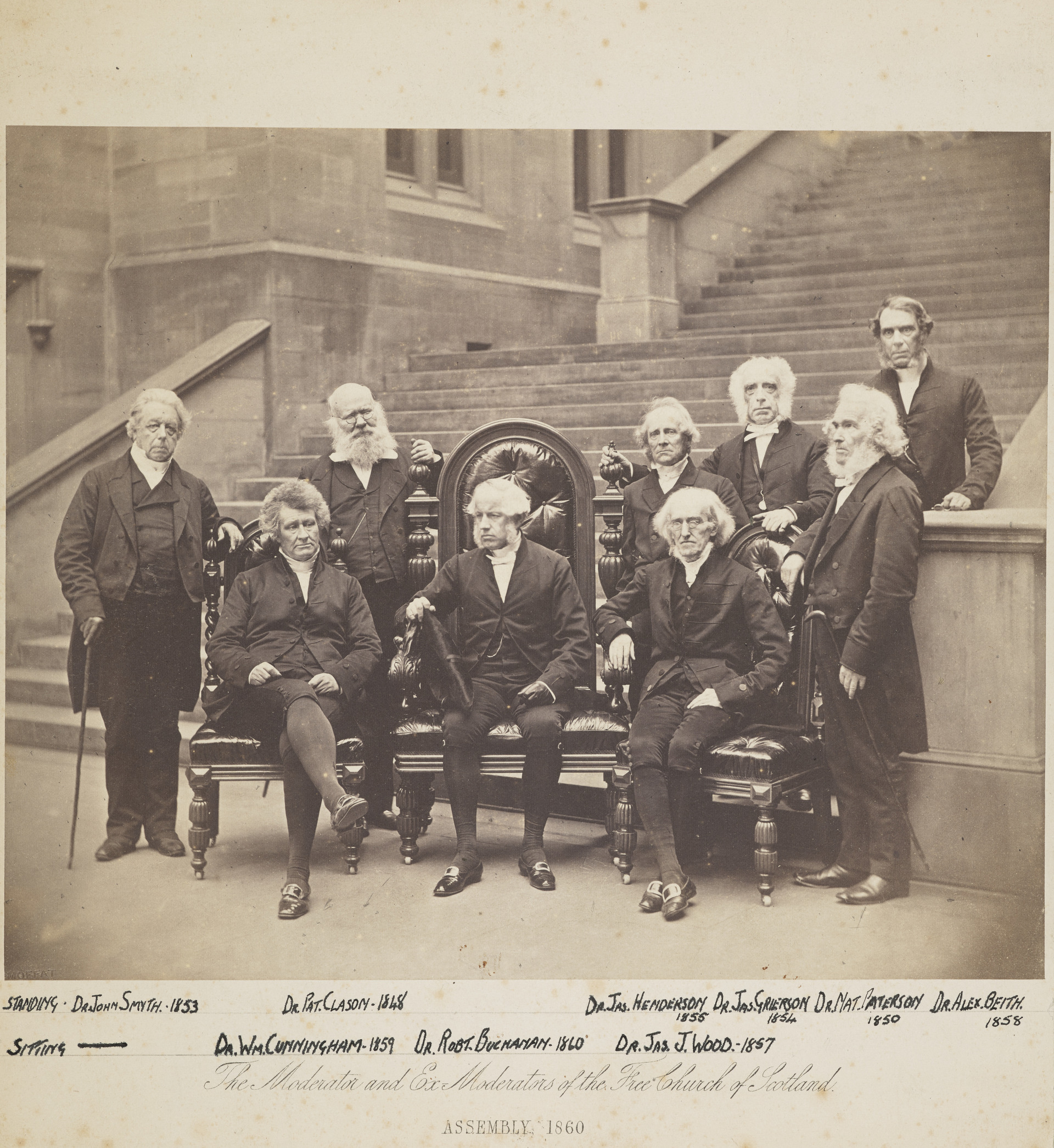
The Moderator and Ex Moderators of the Free Church of Scotland, Assembly; 1860. Pictured, from left to right, are (standing) John Smyth, Patrick Clason, Henderson, James Grierson, Nathaniel Paterson and Alexander Beith (behind); (seated) William Cunningham, Robert Buchanan and James Julius Wood

He married twice:

- (1) 16 March 1826, Eleanor Rutherford (died 27 January 1841), daughter of James Russell, Professor of Clinical Surgery, University of Edinburgh, and had eight children.

== Publications ==
- Two occasional sermons (Edinburgh, 1828; Glasgow, 1843)
- Popery un-changed, the Creed of Pius IV. still the Creed of the Church of Rome
- Lectures IV. (On the Social Condition of the People)
- VII. (On the Jews)
- VIII. (On the Evidences of Revealed Religion)
- I. (On Protestantism)

== Bibliography ==
- The Border Almanac, 1875

== Artistic recognition ==
He was photographed in 1860 (illustrated right) at the foot of the steps to New College with several other ex-Moderators of the Free Church.
