= Mackintosh MacKay =

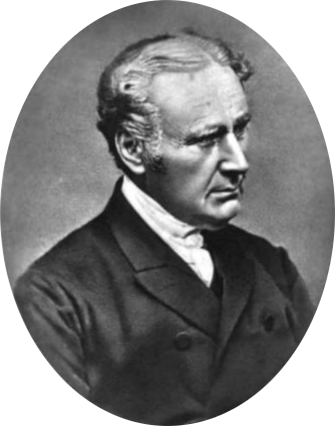
- Mackintosh Mackay from Disruption Worthies of the Highlands

Personal details
- Born: 1793
- Died: 1873 (aged 79–80)

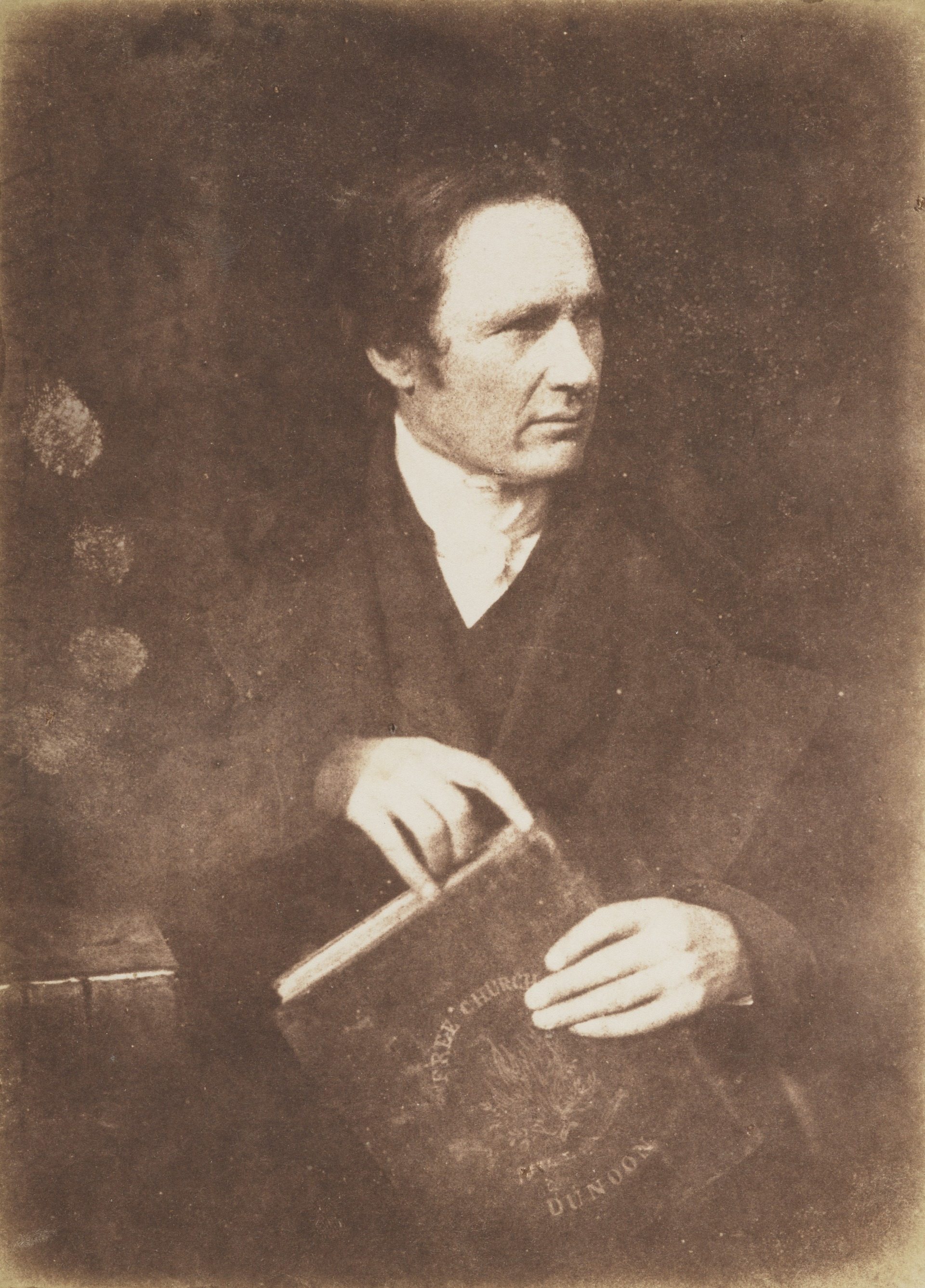
Rev. Dr Mackintosh MacKay, (1800 - 1873). Of Dunoon, Melbourne and Sydney, Church of Scotland and Free Church minister, Gaelic scholar

Mackintosh MacKay (1793 – 1873) was a Scottish minister and author who served as Moderator of the General Assembly of the Free Church of Scotland in 1849. He edited the Highland Society's prodigious Gaelic dictionary ('Dictionarium Scoto-Celticum) in 1828.

== Early life and education ==
MacKay was born on 18 November 1793 at Duardbeg on Edrachillis Bay in Sutherland, one of seven children to Cpt Alexander Mackay and his wife Helen, daughter of Alexander Falconer, minister of Eddrachillis. He studied at the University of St Andrews then at Divinity Hall in Edinburgh. After he was licensed by the Presbytery of Skye, he was employed as a schoolmaster at Portree. He was ordained to Laggan 28 September 1825.

In 1825, he was appointed minister of Laggan parish, where he remained until 1832, when he was appointed minister of the united parishes of Dunoon and Kilmun. Such was his success there that he soon had the Dunoon church enlarged, Kilmodan erected into a separate parish, and two mission churches appointed—one at Toward and the other at Ardentinny. It was while here that he edited the works of Rob Donn, the Sutherlandshire bard, which were published in 1829. He supplied a biography of the bard, which has given rise to much controversy. He was awarded a LLD from the University of Glasgow in 1829. At Laggan Manse William Forbes Skene, Historiographer-Royal for Scotland, then aged 19, studied Gaelic under MacKay's tuition. He was subsequently presented by George William, Duke of Argyll, August 1831 and translated and admitted to Dunoon on 19 April 1832.

His 27 February 1840 Address to the Parishioners of Dunoon and Kilmun, given from the Manse in Dunoon, was published later that year. An 1842 addendum by MacKay was later included.

== Post disruption ==
At the Disruption in 1843 he gave up one of the best livings in the Church of Scotland and joined the Dissenting party. Between 1844 and 1847 he spent much of his time visiting the Highlands and Islands in the yacht "Breadalbane", preaching to the people, and at the same time writing for and editing the Gaelic organ of the Free Church—An Fhianuis. Of this publication 37 parts appeared, dating from 1845 to 1850.

During the distress in the Highlands in 1846-7-8, consequent on the failure of the potato crop, he brought the condition of his fellow Highlanders before the General Assembly of the Free Church, with the result that upwards of £15,000 was collected for their relief. He also did much in the way of providing bursaries for Highland students, and with the assistance of the Ladies' Society of the Free Church he had a number of schools established in remote parts of the Highlands and Islands.

MacKay was elected moderator of the Free Church General Assembly on 24 May 1849, succeeding Patrick Clason of Buccleuch Church in the role. The Assembly was held at Tanfield Hall in Canonmills. He was succeeded in turn by Nathaniel Paterson in 1850.

In the early 1850s he travelled to Australia to spread the views of the Free Church. He became minister of the Gaelic Church, Melbourne, Australia, 1854-1856. He was elected minister of St George's Presbyterian Church, Sydney, New South Wales, in May 1856, being responsible for its first permanent purpose-built church in 1860. He continued there from 1856-61.

Returning home he took up a post in Free Church, Tarbert, Harris, 1862-1868. He died at 3 Bellfield, Portobello on 17 May 1873. He is buried in Duddingston Kirkyard in south Edinburgh. The grave lies against the western boundary wall. A secondary memorial exists to MacKay in Grange Cemetery reasserting his burial in Duddingston.

== Relation with Sir Walter Scott ==
He was a notable Gaelic scholar and preacher. He was friendly with Sir Walter Scott, who described him as "modest, intelligent, and gentle." "It being Sunday, he favoured us [at Abbotsford] with an excellent discourse on the Socinian controversy, which I wish my friend Mr Laidlaw had heard."

== Family ==
On the 22 February 1828 he married Frances (d. 23 March 1877), daughter of Francis Burton, Edinburgh. Together they had a son who was born on 23 January and died 23 March 1829.

== Publications ==
- Dictionarium Scoto-Celticum: A Dictionary of the Gaelic Language (as editor)(1828) (the first Gaelic dictionary to contain 'Vocabularies of Latin and English Words')
- Memoir of Robert Donn
- Exposition of Matthew 5
- Statistical Account of the United Parishes of Dunoon and Kilmun
- Memoir of Rob Donn, and Observations on his Character and Poetry (Inverness, 1829)
- Four Single Sermons (Liverpool and Greenock, 1833-46)
- Sermons, on the Christian Warfare and Titles of Christ (Edinburgh, 1836)
- The Treasure: A Selection from the Olney Hymns (Gaelic) (Glasgow, 1835)
- Address to the Parishioners of Dunoon and Kilmun (Greenock, 1 840)
- Practical Exposition of Matthew V., 1-10, 2 vols. (Edinburgh, 1845)
- Martyrdom of John Brown (Edin., 1846)
- Address to the General Assembly of 1849 (Edin., 1851)
- Sermon Preached before the General Assembly (Edin., 1851)
- Scots Worthies and Church History (London, 1872)
- Sermon on the Decease of the Rev. Roderick Macleod \Bracadale\ with Memorials of his Life, Character, and Ministry (Edinburgh, 1869)
- Account of the Parish (New Stat. Account)
- History of the Church (Gaelic), Description of the Hill-Fort of Dun-da-Laimh, in the Parish of Laggan " (Trans. Arch. Soc, iv.)
- edited An Fhianuis (The Witness), 1845-50.
- He superintended the printing of the Highland Society's Dictionarium-Scoto-Celticum, 2 vols. (Edinburgh, 1828)

== Bibliography ==
- Cameron's Centenary History of the Presbyterian Church in New South Wales, i., 56, 63, passim (Sydney, 1905)
- Maclean's Typographia-Scoto-Gadelica, 236
- Sir Walter Scott's Journal, 124, 206, 406-7
- The Quarterly Review (July 1831)

== Gallery ==
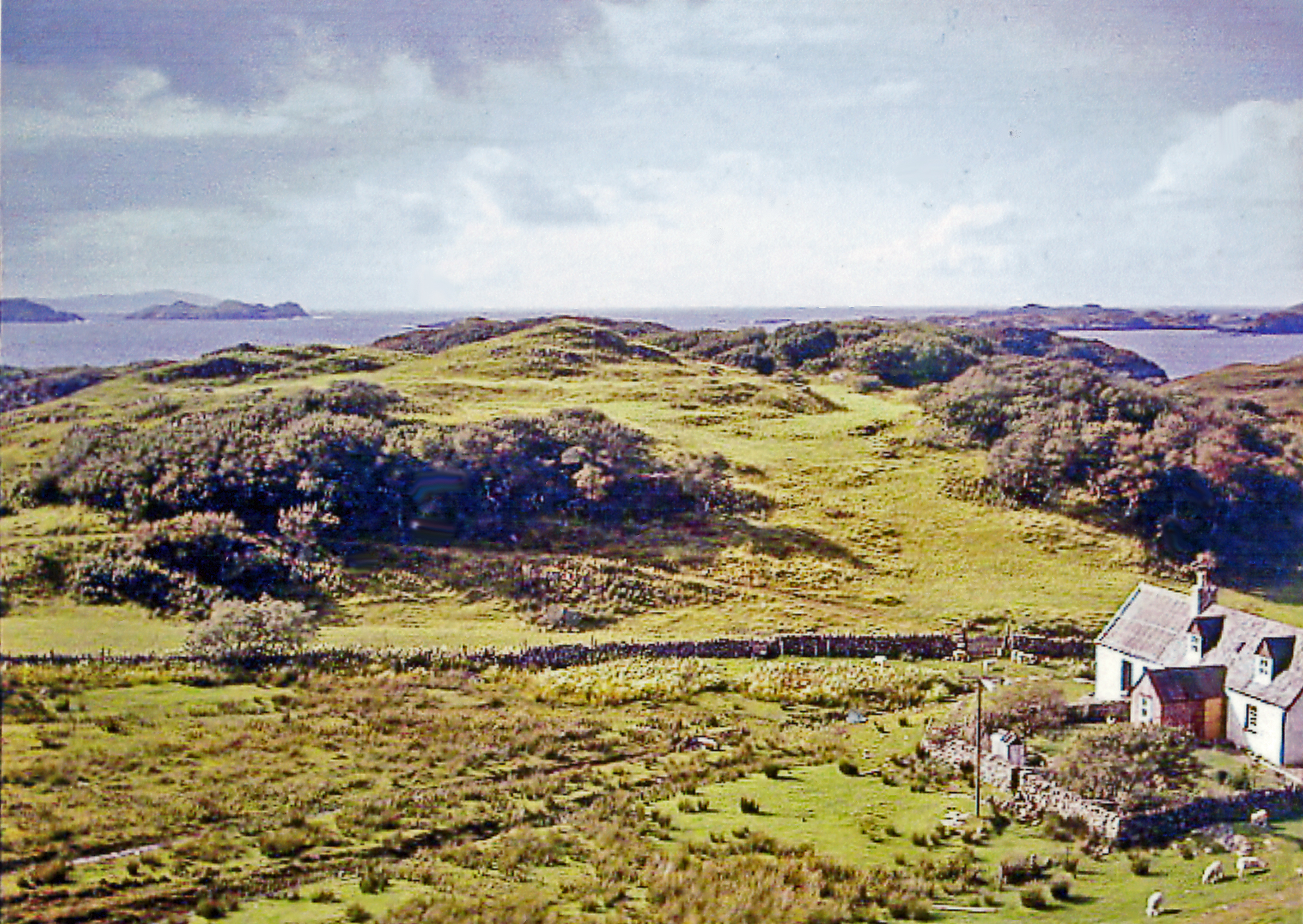
MacKay’s birthplace at Edrachillis Bay

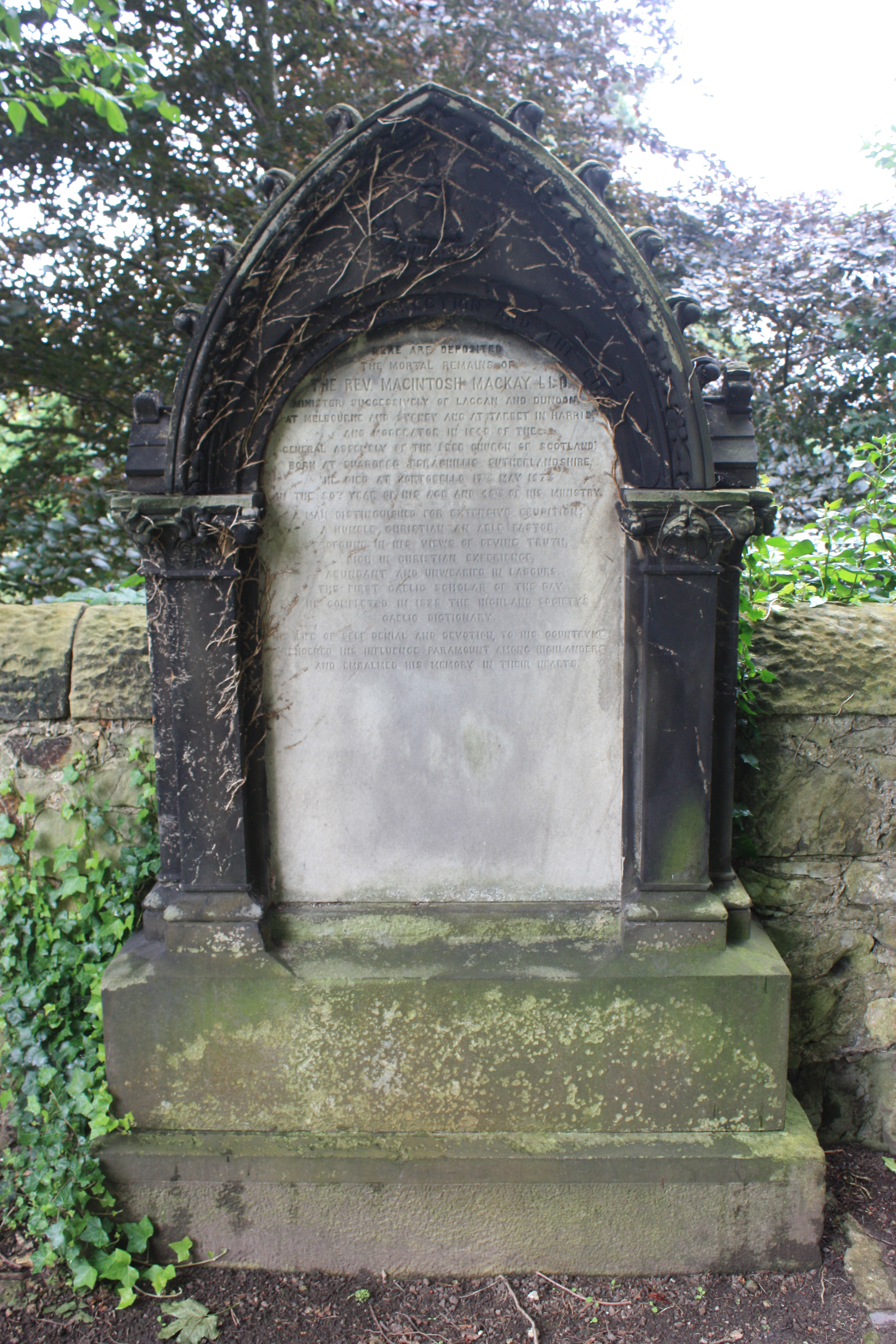
The grave of Very Rev Mackintosh MacKay, Duddingston Kirkyard

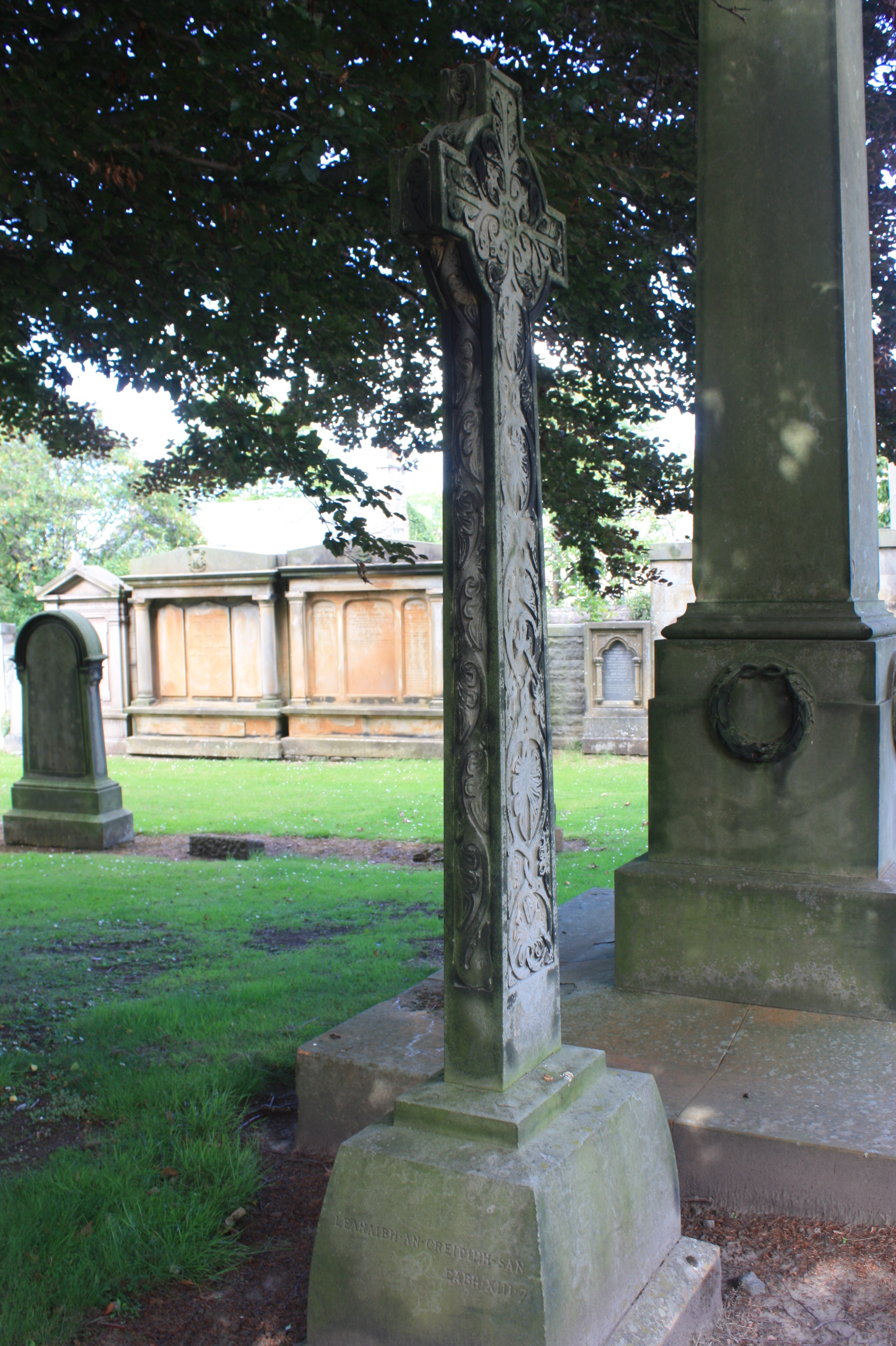
The memorial to Mackintosh MacKay, Grange Cemetery, Edinburgh
