= Frederick Ogilvie =

Director-General of the BBC

Sir Frederick Ogilvie FRSE
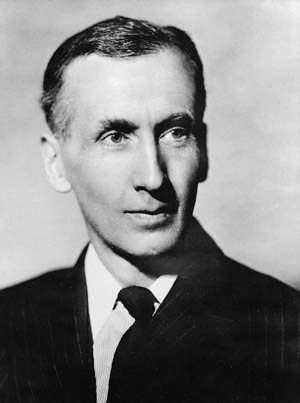
- Ogilvie in 1939

2nd Director-General of the BBC
- In office 19 July 1938 – 26 January 1942
- Preceded by: John Reith
- Succeeded by: Cecil Graves; Robert Foot

President and Vice-Chancellor of Queen's University Belfast
- In office 1935–1938
- Preceded by: Sir Richard Livingstone
- Succeeded by: Sir David Lindsay Keir

Personal details
- Born: Frederick Wolff Ogilvie; 7 February 1893 Valparaíso, Chile
- Died: 10 June 1949 (aged 56) Oxford, England
- Spouse: Mary Helen Macaulay (m. 1922)
- Children: 3, including Robert
- Education: Packwood Haugh School; Clifton College
- Alma mater: Balliol College, Oxford

Sir Frederick Wolff Ogilvie FRSE (7 February 1893 – 10 June 1949) was a British broadcasting executive and university administrator, who was Director-General of the BBC from 19 July 1938 to 26 January 1942, and was succeeded by joint Directors-General Cecil Graves and Robert Foot. He also served as Vice-Chancellor of Queen's University Belfast from 1934 to 1938. He was knighted by King George VI on 10 June 1942.

== Early life and education ==
Ogilvie was born in February 1893 in Valparaíso, Chile, the youngest son of Mary Ann (née Wolff) and William Maxwell Ogilvie, an engineer from Harrow Weald in northwest London. His parents were of Scottish descent. Ogilvie was educated at Packwood Haugh School and Clifton College, before beginning studying for a Literae humaniores degree at Balliol College, Oxford in 1911. From the beginning of his undergraduate studies, he displayed an interest in economics.

Having gained first class in his Honour Moderations exams, Ogilvie's studies were interrupted by the start of the First World War. He enrolled in the army two days after the announcement of war, joining as a second lieutenant in the 4th Bedfordshire Regiment. Posted to France, he sustained serious injuries in the Battle of Hill 60 in April 1915, losing his left arm. Despite his injury, he continued in military service, rising to the rank of captain by the time of his demobilization in 1919. He returned to Balliol and completed a modified version of his degree.

== Career ==
=== Academics ===
In the autumn term of 1919, he was appointed as an economics lecturer at Trinity College, Oxford, becoming a fellow of the college the following year. In 1926, he was appointed Chair of Political Economy at the Management School of Economics at Edinburgh University. He later acted as an economic advisor to a group of Conservative MPs.

In 1929 he was elected a Fellow of the Royal Society of Edinburgh. His proposers were Sir Edmund Taylor Whittaker, Ralph Allan Sampson, Adam Mitchell Hunter and John Edwin MacKenzie.

Ogilvie was one of the first British economists to recognise the significance of tourism. Ogilvie formulated one of the earliest social science definitions of "tourist" in the 1930s, defining the term as "any person whose movements fulfill two conditions: first, that absence from home is relatively short, and second, that money spent during absence is money derived from home and not in the place visited." He wrote on this subject in his book The Tourist Movement (1933), outlining how more expenditure on tourism could bring about faster growth in that area. He also contributed articles on economics and tourism to Chambers's Encyclopaedia. His other academic writings included contributions to the Encyclopaedia of the Social Sciences and the Dictionary of National Biography, as well as journals such as The Economic Journal, The Scottish Historical Review and the Quarterly Review.

Alongside his interest in tourism, Ogilvie had a concern for Scottish economic matters. He was a member of the chamber of commerce in Edinburgh, as well as other trade organisations from 1927, and in the 1930s was a government advisor on issues relating to youth unemployment and adult education. Between 1932 and 1934, he was a member of the governing body for Edinburgh University.

In 1934, he became vice-chancellor of Queen's University Belfast, where he also served as Professor of Political Economy. He continued at the university for four years.

=== Broadcasting ===
Ogilvie became the second Director-General of the BBC in 1938, following John Reith, who had been instrumental in the early development of the corporation. He served in this position until early 1942, but made little impact at the BBC, although an exception was recruiting Lindley Fraser to head the BBC's German service, where Fraser developed a large German audience throughout the war. Historian Asa Briggs described Ogilvie's period in office as "short, stormy and in some ways calamitous". R. C. Norman, who was chair of the BBC when Ogilvie was appointed, later described him as having every ability "except that of being able to manage a large organization, the one quality which was indispensable". Ogilvie resigned in 1942, and received a knighthood the same year.

=== Later life and death ===
Between 1943 and 1945, Ogilvie worked for the British Council. In 1944, he considered becoming the editor for a national newspaper, but instead became principal of Jesus College, Oxford. He made a much greater mark in this role than at the BBC, being able to draw on his experience and personal contacts to further the growth of the college. From 1945, he became the chair of the Tin Box Wages Council, which had been set up to regulate wages within the tin box industry. He continued in both of these roles until his death in 1949 in London. Queen's University named one of its blocks of student accommodation after him.

== Personal life ==
Ogilvie had an interest in music from his childhood and became significantly involved in the Oxford Bach Choir, of which he spent some time as chairman of the committee. He also had a passion for outdoor pursuits.

In 1922, he married Mary Helen Macaulay, the daughter of Alexander Beith Macaulay, who was professor of apologetics and systematic theology at Trinity College, Glasgow. They had three sons. The oldest James Willam, was killed in an accident while climbing the Matterhorn. Another, Robert Maxwell Ogilvie, followed in his father's footsteps, becoming a fellow of Balliol College in 1957.

Four years after his death, Lady Ogilvie became principal of St Anne's College, Oxford. She died in 1990, aged 90.

== Notes ==
Academic offices
Preceded by Sir Richard Livingstone	President and Vice-Chancellor of Queen's University Belfast; 1935–1938	Succeeded by Sir David Lindsay Keir
Media offices
Preceded by John Reith	Director-General of the BBC; 1938–1942	Succeeded by Cecil Graves and Robert W. Foot
