= Ian Jacob =

Former Director-General of the BBC

Lieutenant-General Sir Ian Jacob GBE CB
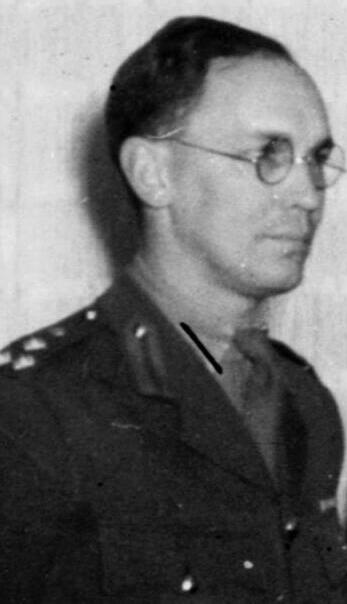
- Jacob as a brigadier at the Casablanca Conference in January 1943
- Born: 27 September 1899; Quetta, Baluchistan Agency, British India
- Died: 24 April 1993 (aged 93)
- Relatives: Field Marshal Sir Claud Jacob (father)
- Military career
- Allegiance: United Kingdom
- Branch: British Army
- Service years: 1918–1946, 1952
- Rank: Lieutenant-general
- Service number: 15845
- Units: Royal Engineers
- Conflicts: North-West Frontier; Second World War
- Awards: Knight Grand Cross of the Order of the British Empire; Companion of the Order of the Bath
- Other work: Director-General of the BBC (1952–59)

Lieutenant-General Sir Edward Ian Claud Jacob, GBE, CB (27 September 1899 – 24 April 1993) was a British Army officer, who served as the Military Assistant Secretary to Winston Churchill's war cabinet and was later a distinguished broadcasting executive, serving as the Director-General of the BBC from 1952 to 1959.

== Early life ==
Jacob was born in 1899 in Quetta, Pakistan (then a part of the British Empire). His father was Field Marshal Sir Claud Jacob, in whose footsteps Ian followed by becoming a professional soldier with the Royal Engineers in 1918, after being educated at both Wellington College, Berkshire, and the Royal Military Academy, Woolwich, where he was commissioned into the Royal Engineers. He subsequently studied the mechanical sciences (engineering) tripos at King's College, Cambridge, graduating with a second-class degree in 1925.

Jacob served as a commander of a company of Gentlemen Cadets at the Royal Military Academy, Woolwich until January 1931 and later at the Staff College, Camberley from 1931 to 1932, (where he passed the entrance examination with record marks), his fellow students there including Brian Horrocks, Sidney Kirkman, Frank Simpson, Cameron Nicholson, Arthur Dowler, Nevil Brownjohn, and Thomas Rees.

In 1924, Jacob married Cecil Treherne, the daughter of another senior army officer, Surgeon Major-General Sir Francis Treherne. The couple had two sons, William and John.

== Wartime work ==
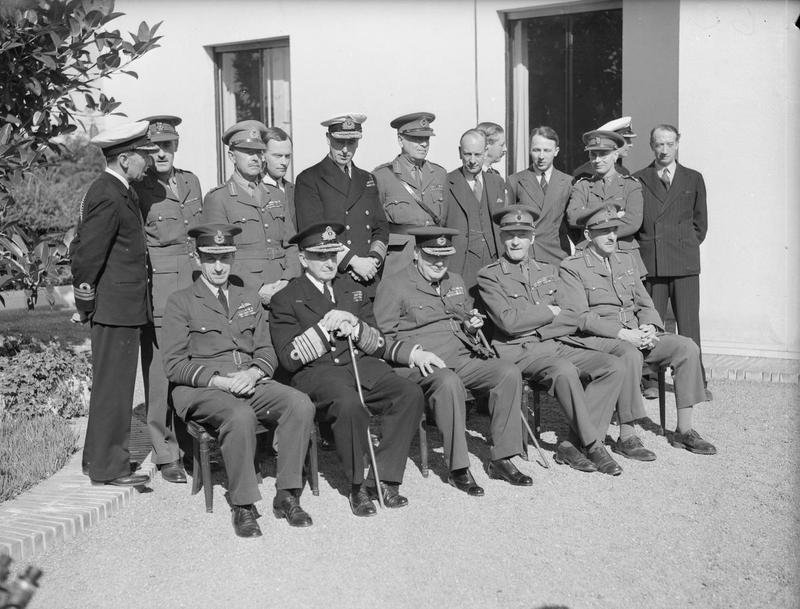
Brigadier Jacob, standing third from the right, arms folded, at the Casablanca Conference, January 1943

Jacob served as the Military Assistant Secretary to the War Cabinet for the duration of the Second World War (he actually asked to be returned to his regiment in 1940, but was refused). He worked closely with Winston Churchill and implemented Churchill's communications during his thirteen wartime journeys outside the United Kingdom. Churchill valued Jacob's efforts enough to endorse his promotion from the rank of colonel to lieutenant general over the course of the war. As a brigadier (war-substantive lieutenant-colonel), Jacob was promoted to the substantive rank of colonel in the Regular Army on 30 June 1943. He was granted the acting rank of major-general on 8 September 1944 and advanced to temporary major-general on 8 September 1945. In the 1944 Birthday Honours, he was appointed a Companion in the Military Division of the Order of the Bath (CB).

== Post-war ==
As Jacob had never been in command of troops, he had few prospects for serious work in the forces after the war and sought to make use of his experience in communications. Indeed, he was one of a number of wartime information service staff who moved into broadcasting after 1945. Jacob retired from the Army on 1 July 1946 with the honorary rank of major-general.

By the end of the war, the BBC's European Service (later the BBC World Service), based at Bush House, had become the world's most respected and sophisticated foreign language broadcasting operation and had been admired for its contribution to the war effort. After the war, however, its significance was greatly reduced and its future in some doubt. The departing head of the service, Sir Ivone Kirkpatrick (who would become the Chairman of the Independent Television Authority a decade later), recommended Jacob as a potential successor. Sir William Haley, the BBC's Director-General, had already met Jacob during preparations to report the news of the D-Day landings and was aware that his political contacts (Churchill in particular) could be valuable. He heeded Kirkpatrick's recommendation, and Jacob was duly appointed Controller of the European Service following his retirement from the Army. Jacob accepted the post shortly after receiving a knighthood for his work with the war cabinet.

In 1947, Haley decided to rationalise the BBC's overlapping European and Overseas services into a single operation. Jacob's successful management of Bush House led to his being appointed Director of the reconstructed Overseas service in which post he continued until 1951. In February 1950, he helped to establish the European Broadcasting Union (responsible for the Eurovision Song Contest and similar events) and served as its first President until 1960.

== Back into government ==
Churchill regained power in 1951, and in addition to being Prime Minister he took the office of Secretary of State for Defence. He immediately asked for William Haley to second Jacob from the BBC to reprise his advisory role, this time under the title of Chief Staff Officer. After a single visit to the United States and Canada, Churchill realised that the Defence portfolio was relatively dull during peacetime; he left the post and appointed Field Marshal the Earl Alexander as his replacement. Jacob was less comfortable working for Alexander than for Churchill, but a new opportunity arose for him in June 1952, when Haley announced he was to leave the BBC to become editor of The Times.

== Jacob as BBC Director-General ==
As Haley departed, it was apparent that Jacob was likely to succeed him in the role of Director-General. Jacob was well respected by the senior staff of the BBC, much more so than the other candidate George Barnes, then the controller of BBC television. (Barnes had been appointed Controller of Television in 1950, despite having no enthusiasm for visual broadcasting, and was not popular within the BBC. Indeed, the BBC's regional controllers informed the Chairman, Lord Simon of Wythenshawe, that they would resign simultaneously if Barnes was chosen over Jacob as Haley's replacement). However, Jacob was still officially seconded to the Ministry of Defence, and so a member of the Board of Management, Sir Basil Nicholls, was made acting Director-General until Jacob could be released back to the BBC. Jacob eventually entered his new job on 1 December 1952.

Jacob's tenure coincided with the rise of television, which was beginning to displace radio as the main broadcast medium (sales of Sound-and-Television licences overtook those of Sound-only licences in 1957). In contrast to Haley's hard-bitten era, Jacob's was a time of financial prosperity for the BBC. Indeed, he initially found it hard to persuade senior staff that money was available and that there was ample opportunity to spend it in developing television to the full.

Jacob was an enthusiast of news and current affairs programming, and was keen to continue the BBC's tradition of accuracy and impartiality in its journalism. However, this goal led him to misinterpret the intentions of the controversial Editor of News, Tahu Hole, who was inclined to abuse the impartiality principle to avoid management responsibilities. In fact, it was only in 1958, by which time BBC News was being put to shame by its competitor Independent Television News, that Jacob finally noticed Hole's shortcomings and moved him into an administrative post. Jacob did, however, campaign for the abolition of the restrictive Fourteen-Day Rule that prevented broadcast analysis of topics that were to be debated in parliament within the next fourteen days (the Rule was finally suspended in December 1956). Also during Jacob's time as Director-General was the first showing of Panorama which is the world's longest-running current affairs series as of 2017.

Jacob's approach to news coverage was not always popular with the government. His former mentor Winston Churchill in particular had never liked the BBC's journalistic impartiality, thinking that broadcast media should be a tool of government rather than a forum of political analysis and criticism. Churchill's successor as Prime Minister, Anthony Eden, objected to the BBC's reporting of the 1956 Suez Crisis. Eden insisted that unfavourable reports of the British bombardment of Egypt should not be broadcast to the world on the BBC's Overseas Service, but Jacob refused to compromise:

If the BBC is found for the first time to be suppressing significant items of news, its reputation would rapidly vanish and the harm to the national interest would enormously outweigh any damage caused by displaying to the world the workings of a free democracy.

Eden responded by cutting the budget of the Overseas Service (which was, unlike today's World Service, funded by the Foreign and Commonwealth Office rather than the Licence fee which funded the rest of the BBC). However, this punitive measure was lifted after Eden's resignation in 1957 with no further restrictions on the BBC's journalistic freedom.

Jacob was replaced as Director-General in 1960 by Hugh Carleton Greene. Though less radical (and certainly less well-known) than Greene, he saw the BBC successfully through many significant events in British broadcasting: the surge in television viewership (aided especially by the coverage of the Coronation of Queen Elizabeth II in 1953); the introduction of the competing ITV service in 1955; the gradual modernisation of some old eccentric practices (the aforementioned Fourteen-Day Rule and the Toddlers' Truce closedown period in the early evening). It was also mostly on the strength of Jacob's work that the 1960 Pilkington Committee on Broadcasting recommended that the third television channel should be offered to the BBC, eventually materialising as BBC2 in 1964.

Jacob's date of retirement was 31 December 1959. The following day, he was appointed a Knight Grand Cross of the Order of the British Empire in the New Year's Honours.

== Later life ==
Jacob was the co-author (along with Lord Ismay) of the 1963 Report on the Central Organisation of Defence, a work he later came to regard as his most important ever. He was also a trustee of the Imperial War Museum between 1966 and 1973 and was a County Councillor in Suffolk for two separate periods (1960–1970 and 1974–1977). He was a Deputy lieutenant for the county from 1964 to 1968.

== Bibliography ==
- Miall, Leonard (1994). Inside the BBC: British Broadcasting Characters. Weidenfeld & Nicolson. pp. 91–101. ISBN 0-297-81328-5.
- Smart, Nick (2005). Biographical Dictionary of British Generals of the Second World War. Barnesley: Pen and Sword Books. ISBN 1-84415-049-6.
- Richardson, Charles (1991). From Churchill's Secret Circle to the BBC: The Biography of Lieutenant General Sir Ian Jacob GBE CB DL. Brassey's. ISBN 978-0-08-037692-9. OCLC 494162074.

Media offices
Preceded by Unknown	Director of External Broadcasting, BBC; 1947–1952	Succeeded by Sir Beresford Clark; 1952–1964
Preceded by William Haley; 1944–1952	Director-General of the BBC; 1952–1959	Succeeded by Hugh Greene; 1960–1969
