= Tangye Lean =

British author (1911–1974)

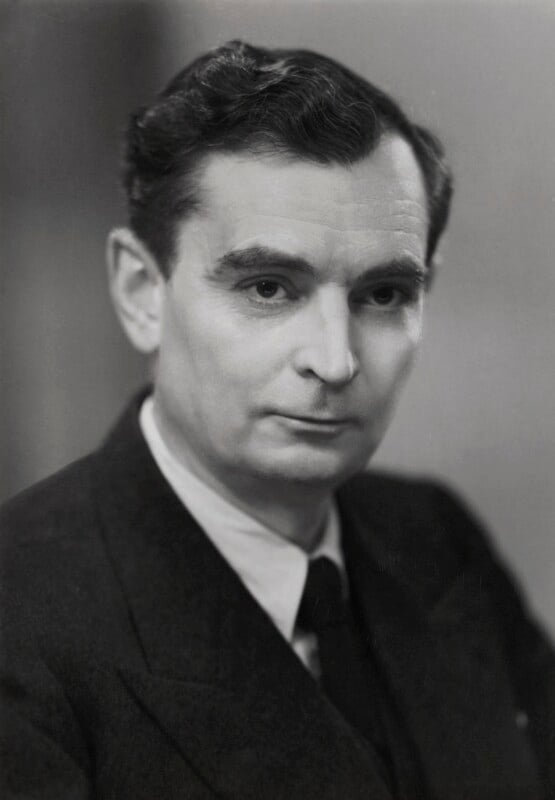
Lean in 1952

Edward Tangye Lean (23 February 1911 – 28 October 1974) was a British author and original founder of the Inklings literary club in Oxford.

== Biography ==
Lean's father was Francis William le Blount Lean and his mother was Helena Annie (née Tangye) Lean, who were married in 1904, separated by 1927, and were both Quakers. He was the younger brother of David Lean, the film director.

After leaving Leighton Park School, Tangye Lean was an undergraduate at University College, Oxford. While at Oxford, he founded the original Inklings club around 1931, for the reading of unfinished compositions. The club consisted of students and dons, including J. R. R. Tolkien and C. S. Lewis. When Lean left Oxford in 1933, the club faltered. However, its name was transferred by Tolkien and Lewis to their literary group at Magdalen College. Lean also contributed to the Isis magazine at Oxford.

Lean went on to become a writer, especially on historical themes. He was a journalist and book reviewer for the News Chronicle. Later, he was Director of External Broadcasting at the BBC.

== Books ==
- Of Unsound Mind (Cobden-Sanderson, 1932)
- Storm in Oxford (Cobden-Sanderson, 1932)
- Voices in the Darkness (Secker and Warburg, 1943)
- The Napoleonists: A study in political disaffection, 1760–1960 (Oxford University Press, 1970)

== See also ==
- Literature in Oxford

Media offices
Preceded by Sir Beresford Clark	Director of External Broadcasting, BBC; 1964–1967	Succeeded by Charles Curran
