= Robert Maxwell Ogilvie =

British classical scholar (1932–1981)

Robert Maxwell Ogilvie FRSE
- Born: 5 June 1932
- Died: 7 November 1981 (aged 49); St Andrews, Scotland
- Occupations: Classical scholar; Headmaster
- Parents: Frederick Wolff Ogilvie (father); Mary Ogilvie (mother)

Academic background
- Education: Rugby School; Balliol College, Oxford; Merton College, Oxford

Academic work
- Discipline: Classics
- Institutions: Balliol College, Oxford; Tonbridge School

Robert Maxwell Ogilvie (5 June 1932 – 7 November 1981) was a British scholar of Latin literature and classical philology.

== Life ==
His parents were Sir Frederick Wolff Ogilvie, director-general of the BBC from 1938 to 1942, and Lady (Mary) Ogilvie (née Macaulay), principal of St Anne's College, Oxford, from 1953 to 1966.

He was educated at Rugby School, then studied Classics at Oxford University (Balliol College 1950–1954, Merton College 1954–1955).

Ogilvie became a Fellow of Balliol College in 1957 and from 1957 to 1970 tutored students.

He was headmaster of Tonbridge School from 1970 to 1975.

From 1975 Ogilvie was professor of Humanity (Latin) at the University of St. Andrews. He is well known for his commentary on the first five books of Livy's Ab urbe condita and his commentary on the Agricola of Tacitus.

In 1979 he was elected a Fellow of the Royal Society of Edinburgh. His proposers were Norman Gash, J Steven Barrow, Geoffrey Barrow and Matthew Black.

He died suddenly in St Andrews on 7 November 1981.

== Family ==
In 1959 he married Jennifer Margaret Roberts.

== Selected works ==
1. A commentary on Livy, books 1–5 (1965). ISBN 9780198144328
2. De vita Agricolae (1967).
3. The Romans and their gods in the age of Augustus (1970). ISBN 9780393053999
4. The library of Lactantius (1978). ISBN 9780198266457
5. Roman literature and society (1980). ISBN 9780140220810

He was co-editor of Classical Quarterly from 1976 until death.
