= Richard Livingstone =

British classical scholar, educationalist and academic administrator

Sir Richard Livingstone KBE
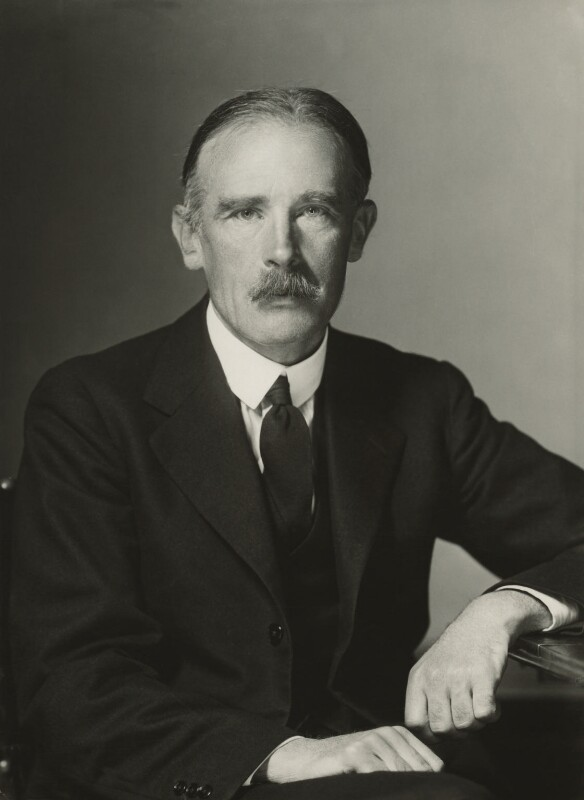
- Born: 23 January 1880; Liverpool, England
- Died: 26 December 1960 (aged 80); Oxford, England
- Spouse: Cecile Stephanie Louise Livingstone

Academic background
- Education: Winchester College New College, Oxford
- Alma mater: New College, Oxford

Academic work
- Discipline: Classical Studies
- Sub-discipline: Greek philosophy, Greek literature, and classical education
- Institutions: Corpus Christi College, Oxford, Queen's University Belfast, University of Oxford
- Richard Livingstone's voice Richard Livingstone's Dunning Trust lecture Recorded 14 Oct 1950

Sir Richard Winn Livingstone (23 January 1880 – 26 December 1960) was a British classical scholar and educationist. He is known for his contributions to classical liberal arts education and his role as an academic administrator at Queen's University Belfast and Corpus Christi College, Oxford.

== Life ==
Livingstone was born on 23 January 1880, in Liverpool, the son of Richard John Livingstone, a Church of England clergyman and honorary canon of Liverpool, and Millicent Julia Allanson-Winn, daughter of Charles Allanson-Winn, 3rd Baron Headley.

He attended Winchester College before studying at New College, Oxford, where he earned a first-class degree in Literae humaniores (Latin and Ancient Greek). Livingstone also won the Chancellor's Prize for Latin Verse and the Arnold Modern Historical Essay Prize. In 1904, he was appointed Fellow and Tutor at Corpus Christi College, Oxford, a position he held until 1924. During this time, he was also appointed librarian in 1905 and was actively involved in academic committees and publications.

In 1920, Livingstone served on the Prime Minister David Lloyd George's committee on the classics and was co-editor of the Classical Review from 1920 to 1922. He took a leave of absence from his role as co-editor to serve as an assistant master at Eton College between 1917 and 1918.

From 1924 to 1933, Livingstone was Vice-Chancellor of Queen's University Belfast in Northern Ireland. His contributions during this period were recognized with a knighthood in 1931.

Following his tenure in Belfast, Livingstone returned to Oxford in 1933 as President of Corpus Christi College. During his time there, he introduced summer schools for colonial administrators, expanded adult education programs, and played a key role in establishing a residential college for women.

In 1944, he delivered the Rede Lecture at Cambridge on Plato and modern education and served as Vice-Chancellor of the University of Oxford from 1944 to 1947. He was elected to the American Philosophical Society in 1948.

Livingstone retired from his position as Vice-Chancellor in 1950 and devoted his final years to writing and lecturing. He particularly focused on defending the value of a liberal arts education, with an emphasis on the classics. He died on 26 December 1960, in Oxford.

== Rede Lecture 1944: Plato and Modern Education ==
Livingstone began his lecture by asserting that the 20th century was marked by freedom, but that freedom alone could not define the 'good life.' He emphasized that liberalism, liberty, and rationalism are valuable only when properly applied and nurtured. In his subsequent lecture, he proposed that Christianity, alongside a renewed ethical system and rational philosophy, represented the "hope of the civilized world." He criticized the loss of fundamental beliefs and common purpose, attributing part of the blame to universities for failing to impart a meaningful philosophy of life. Livingstone concluded his final lecture by suggesting that while ethics alone are insufficient as a guide to conduct, the search for a modern equivalent of Aristotle could help navigate the moral uncertainties of the time.

== Personal life ==
Livingstone married Cecile Stephanie Louise Livingstone (née Wilson) on 8 July 1913.

== Awards and honours ==
As Vice-Chancellor of Queen's University Belfast, he was awarded the Knight Commander of the Order of the British Empire in 1931 in recognition of his successful efforts to enhance the university's resources and improve its public relations.

He also received honorary doctorates from ten universities and was honored with several international awards, including:

- The Norwegian Haakon VII's Freedom Cross
- Commandeur of the Légion d'Honneur (France)
- Knight Commander of the Order of King George I of Greece

== Legacy ==
Queen's University named Livingstone Hall, a principal building in the Queen's Elms Halls of Residence, in his honor.

His portrait, painted by the eminent Hungarian artist Philip de László, hangs in the Great Hall of the University.

== Books ==
- The Greek Genius and Its Meaning to Us (1912)
- A Defence of Classical Education (1916)
- The Legacy of Greece: Essays Edited by R. W. Livingstone (1921) – Includes the essay "Literature" by Livingstone
- The Pageant of Greece (1923)
- The Mission of Greece (1928)
- Greek Ideals and Modern Life (1935)
- Portrait of Socrates: Being the Apology, Crito, and Phaedo of Plato (1938) – English translation, with contributions from Benjamin Jowett
- The Future in Education (1941)
- Education for a World Adrift (1943)
- Plato and Modern Education (1944)
- Education and the Spirit of the Age (1952)
- The Rainbow Bridge (1959)
- The History of the Peloponnesian War – Edited and translated by Livingstone (1943)
- Essentials of Education – January 1952 Issue, The Atlantic

Academic offices
Preceded by Rev. Thomas Hamilton	President and Vice-Chancellor of Queen's University Belfast; 1924–1933	Succeeded by Sir Frederick Wolff Ogilvie
Preceded by Percy Stafford Allen	President of Corpus Christi College, Oxford; 1933–1950	Succeeded by William Francis Ross Hardie
Preceded by Sir William David Ross	Vice-Chancellor of Oxford University; 1944–1947	Succeeded by William Teulon Swan Stallybrass
