= C. G. H. Simon =

British General Commissioner of Income Tax

Christopher Gordon Horsfall Simon JP (14 November 1914 – 20 February 2002), known as C. G. H. Simon, was a British General Commissioner of Income Tax.

== Early life ==
Simon was educated at Packwood Haugh School from 1924 to 1928, Gresham's School, Holt, from 1928 to 1933, and King's College, Cambridge, where he read economics under John Maynard Keynes.

== Career ==
After a posting with the British Council, Simon served during the Second World War in the Intelligence Corps, in which he enlisted as a private soldier. He ended his service as a major with the Allied Control Commission in post-war Germany. In 1948, he returned to civilian life, joining the family business, the Simon Engineering Group, before being appointed to the Income Tax service, in which he became General Commissioner.

Simon also became a magistrate of the Manchester bench, served on the Regional Hospital Board for Lancashire, the Council of Manchester University, and the governing body of Cheadle Hulme School.

== Private life ==
With his wife Marjorie, Simon had two sons Andrew and Henry. In 1999, his home address was Cloud End, Alderley Edge, Cheshire.

He was a nephew of Ernest Simon, 1st Baron Simon of Wythenshawe.
