= Alexander Beith =

Scottish minister

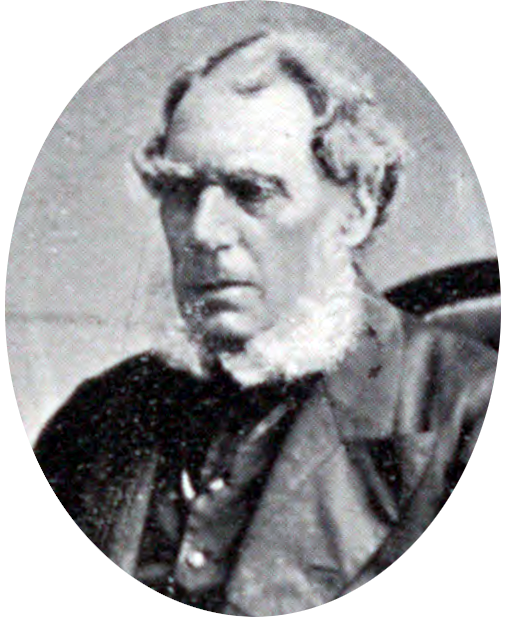
- Alexander Beith from Old Faces
- Church: Stirling Free

Personal details
- Born: 1799
- Died: 1891 (aged 91–92)

minister of Oban
- In office 27 March 1822 – 9 November 1824

minister of Hope Street Gaelic Chapel
- In office 9 November 1824 – 29 November 1826

minister of Kilbrandon and Kilchattan
- In office 29 November 1826 – 24 September 1830

minister of Glenelg
- In office 24 September 1830 – 26 September 1839

minister of Stirling East
- In office 26 September 1839 – 18 May 1843

minister of Stirling North Free
- In office 1843 – 11 May 1891

Moderator of the General Assembly of the Free Church of Scotland
- In office 20 May 1858 – close

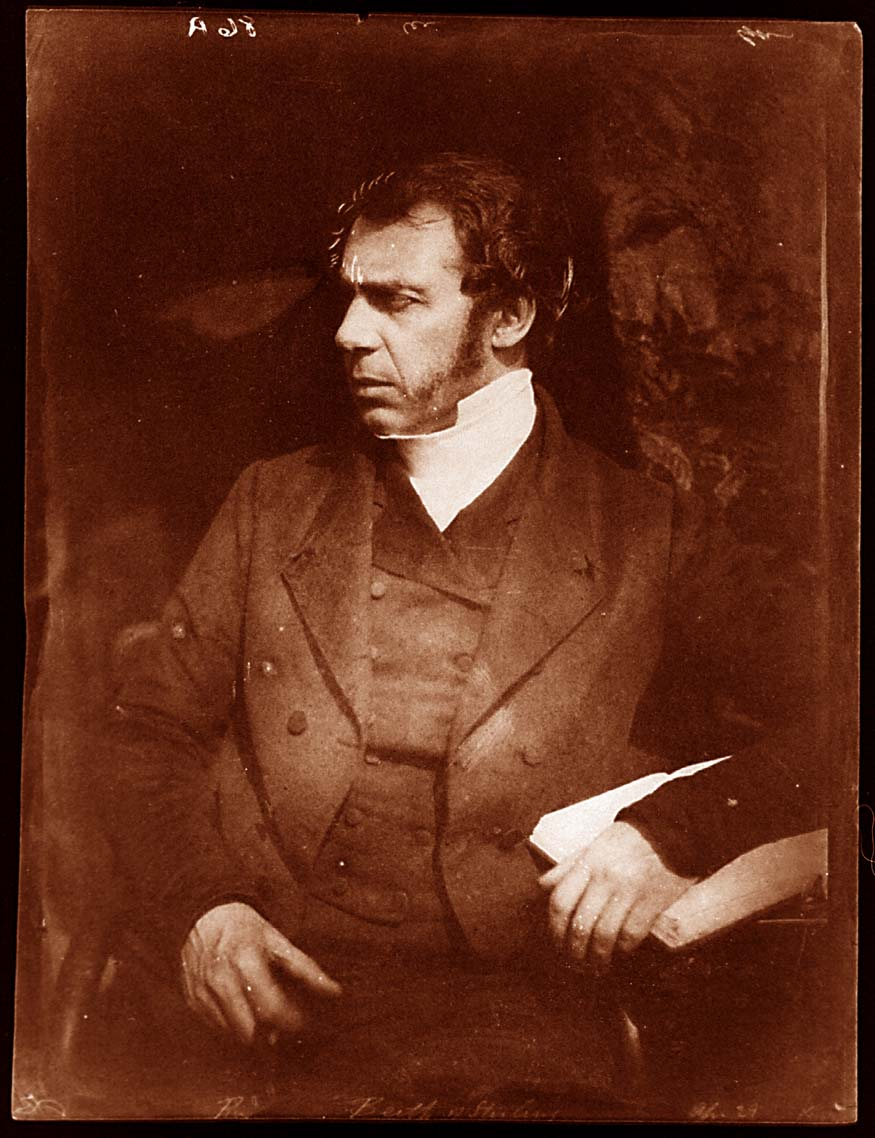
Alexander Beith by Hill & Adamson

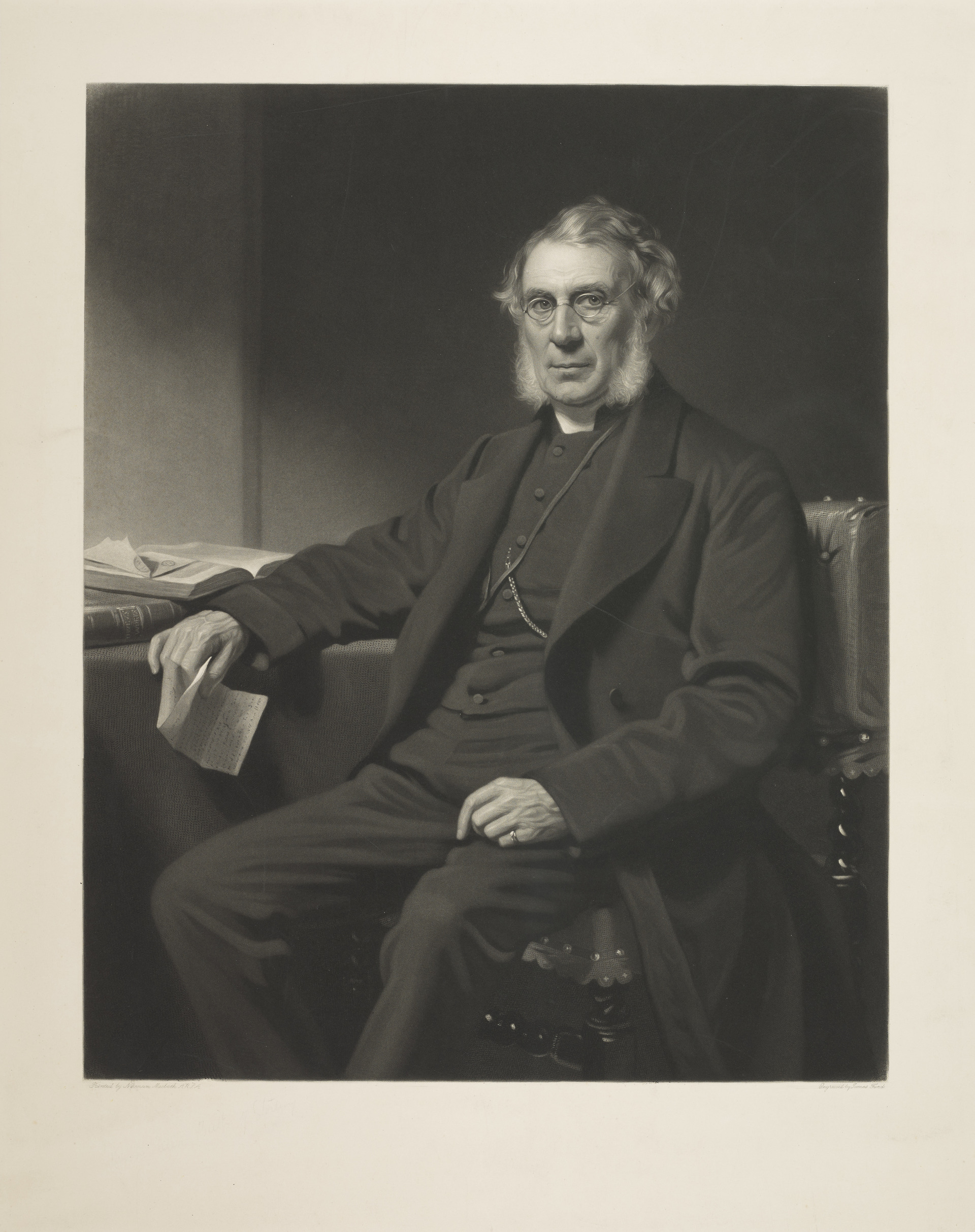
Alexander Beith by James Faed

Alexander Beith (1799–1891) was a Scottish minister and author who served as Moderator of the General Assembly of the Free Church of Scotland 1858/59.

== Early life and education ==
He was born at Campbeltown, Argyllshire, on 13 January 1799. His parents were Gilbert Beith and Helen Elder. Beith's father was a land agent and farmer in the Kintyre district of Argyleshire, and was a man of wide reading, especially in theology and church history. After the usual course of education at Campbeltown, Beith entered Glasgow University, on 20 November 1811, with a view to the ministry of the church of Scotland. He was a student of William M'Gill. After some time spent as a tutor, he was licensed as a preacher, by the presbytery of Kintyre, on 7 February 1821. He delivered his first sermons — both in Gaelic and English — in Campbeltown the following Sabbath. But although he spent so many years in Gaelic-speaking parishes, Beith was not fluent in Gaelic in his young days. Beith was helped by a servant girl as he sought to improve his Gaelic.

== Career ==
In March he was elected minister of the Chapel of Ease in Oban, where he rapidly became popular and successful. He laboured there until November 1824, when he was transferred to Hope Street Church, Glasgow. Beith was married to Julia Robson, whom he had met in Oban when at the age of fifteen she became a communicant member of his congregation. Four years later she became his wife."

Staying there for two years, he ministered to a large congregation. In 1824 the fourth Gaelic Chapel in Glasgow, Hope Street, was constituted. It was established to meet the demands of people with Argyllshire Gaelic who felt that they were not being properly catered for. Those wanting a new chapel had stated in their petition, "the difference between the dialects of the West and North Highlands is so great that the natives of the one frequently do not understand at all the language spoken in the other." Alexander Beith became the first minister of Hope Street Gaelic Chapel, and although his ministry was a short one, no doubt his Argyll dialect was acceptable to this new congregation. The sitting accommodation (for 1500 persons) was soon found inadequate for the worshippers, amongst them many of the leading families in the City.

In 1826 he removed to the parish of Kilbrandon in Argyllshire. He was presented, by the Earl of Breadalbane. Beith was a prolific writer in the course of his long life. It is significant that his first two publications, on different aspects of the sacrament of Baptism, were in Gaelic. In 1824 he published Dearbhaidhean an aghaidh Teagasg nan Anabaisteach. In 1827 there followed Leabhar Cheistean mu Nadur a Bhaistidh, which was reprinted in 1840." Beith’s Gaelic reportedly does not flow quite as well as that of John Swanson of the Small Isles. Donald Maclean comments of Beith’s catechism on baptism, "The orthography is very faulty, and evidently, the proofs were never corrected, if indeed proof sheets were ever issued.""’

In 1830 Beith moved to the parish of Glenelg, Invernessshire. He was presented in 1830, by Lord Glenelg, and Drysdale comments that, special circumstances in each case made it manifest that he should accept the appointments. When Beith was minister in Glenelg a tragedy struck the family when four of the children died in the course of six weeks. The oldest of the children who died, Matilda, when she knew she was dying, spoke to the others about her faith. The servants were then summoned and she addressed them as well. In the book which Beith wrote about that period, Sorrowing yet Rejoicing, he tells how the servants were then summoned. "One of them who, she knew, did not understand English, she addressed in Gaelic, solemnly warning and entreating her and all of them to go to Christ."

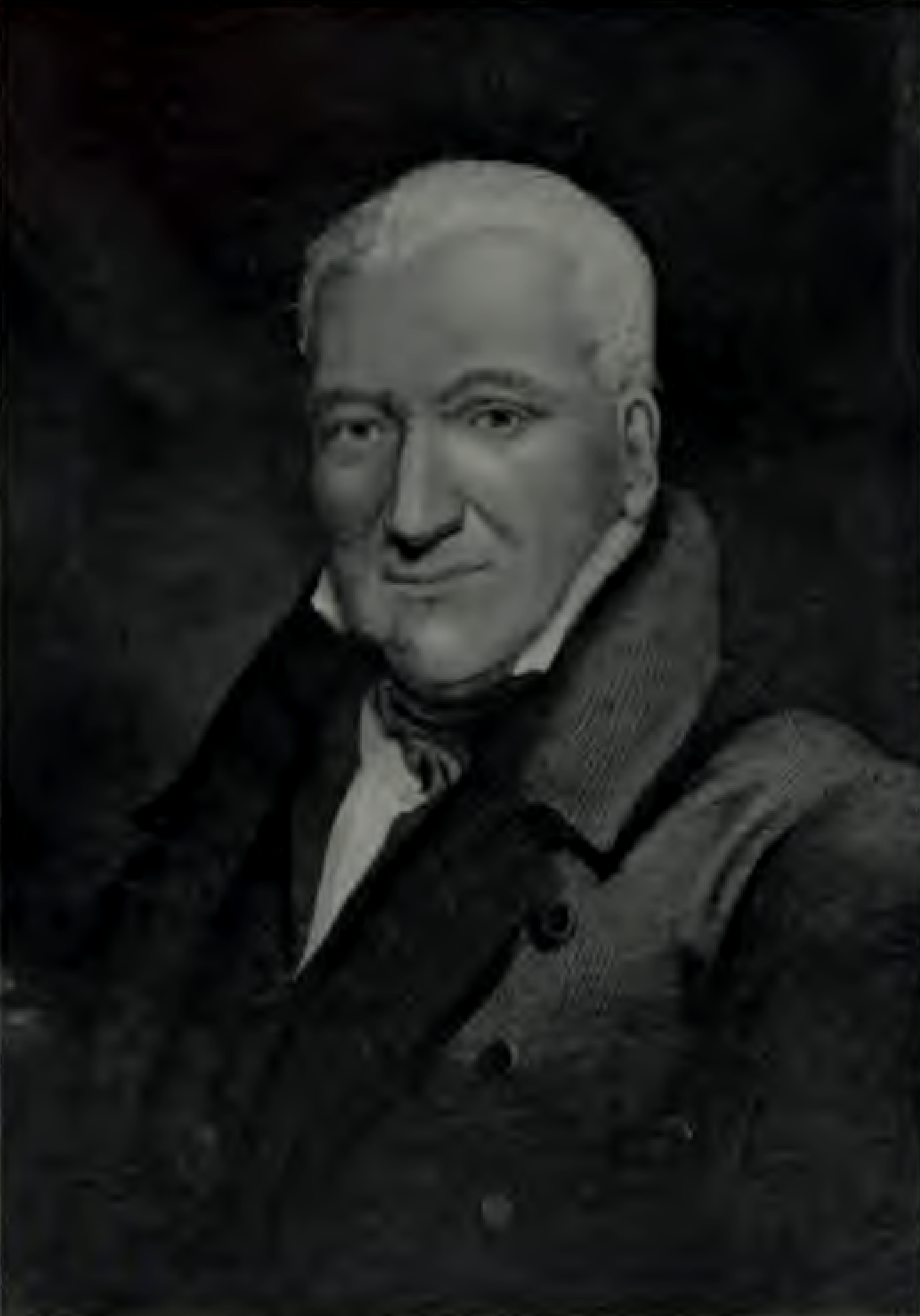
Peter M'Dougal - High School teacher and Gaelic Precentor

In 1839 he was called to the first charge of Stirling. At the time Beith came to Stirling there were two Established Churches, the West and the East, and three ministers, the third minister preaching in both churches every Sabbath, and dispensing two Communions every year, while the first and second ministers had only one service each Sabbath, and one Communion. This arrangement, coupled with the unsatisfactory state of matters arising out of there being a general Session for the whole parish, was not to Beith's liking, and he took steps for the erection of a third church, which culminated in the building of North Parish Church in 1842. In speaking, at a later period, on the state of matters above referred to, he said — " I might have taken my stipend, and been contented with this order of things, and gone on and on and on; but where would my conscience have been? If I was to obey conscience, I must prepare for the storm. I could then easily understand how other ministers were so ready to accept calls to go elsewhere; and I confess to you, what I never said in public before, that when proposals were made to me to be removed to Edinburgh, to one of the charges there, and made three times, the question of conscience at the time of the Disruption was not stronger with me than when I was called to decide whether I should go, and quit the state of things in Stirling, or stay and fight against it, and try, at least, to reform things. I stayed, and in a short time gathered about me many influential friends." North Church was erected in 1842 by Beith and ten of his friends in Stirling, and he was again selected to enter an empty church, which, however, in a year was nearly filled, and then came the Disruption.

In 1841 the Highlanders attending Beith's Gaelic services presented him with a plate, with Gaelic inscription, expressive of their gratitude for his voluntary services in preaching to them in their own language every alternate Sabbath, and in which he had not disappointed them for a single day since the commencement. Before Beith's arrival the Gaelic community met with a school teacher Peter M'Dougal.

When the agitation on the subject of spiritual independence was reaching a crisis in the church of Scotland, Beith was one of the seven ministers appointed in 1842 to preach at Strathbogie in spite of the prohibition of the civil courts.

== At the Disruption ==
Beith was one of the 474 ministers who in 1843 left the established church and formed the Free Church of Scotland. He was one of the body of over 400 who marched to Tanfield Hall, and his portrait is included in the historical Disruption picture. His attention was directed to how matters would fare with his own congregation, and on his arrival from Edinburgh on the Saturday evening he found they had secured the Corn Exchange, where service was conducted for about a year when what was known as "the little church" was opened. Beith ministered there for eight years, the necessity, meanwhile, for a larger building becoming more and more pressing. He himself shrank from initiating the erection of a third church, but his congregation took the matter in hand, the result being the building of the Free North Church, which was opened on 27 February 1853, the collection taken that day amounting to £1360, and entirely freeing the congregation from debt.

== Wider church work ==
In 1847 Beith gave evidence on the question of sites before a committee of the House of Commons, some landowners having refused sites for the erection of buildings in connection with the Free Church. He took a prominent part in educational and other matters affecting the new religious denomination. The honorary degree of D.D. was conferred upon him in 1850 by Princeton University.

In 1858 he was elected moderator of the general assembly of the free church, in succession to James Julius Wood. This Assembly was the first to deal with the Cardross Case. Beith regularly conducted two lengthy services every Sabbath, together with a week-day lecture, taking, besides, a prominent part, not only in Presbyterial and general ecclesiastical matters, but in public affairs as well, but, in 1869, following upon a severe illness, he was appointed an assistant. In the eight years during which he was thus aided, no fewer than twenty-one young men were appointed to the task.

Beith was a fluent speaker and able preacher; his theological position was broad and liberal. When the deposition of William Robertson Smith was first moved in the assembly, Beith proposed and carried a motion that the charges be withdrawn and the professor be restored to his chair at Aberdeen University. 'He held that critical study of the scriptures was not inconsistent with reverence for them and belief in their inspiration.

== Retiral ==
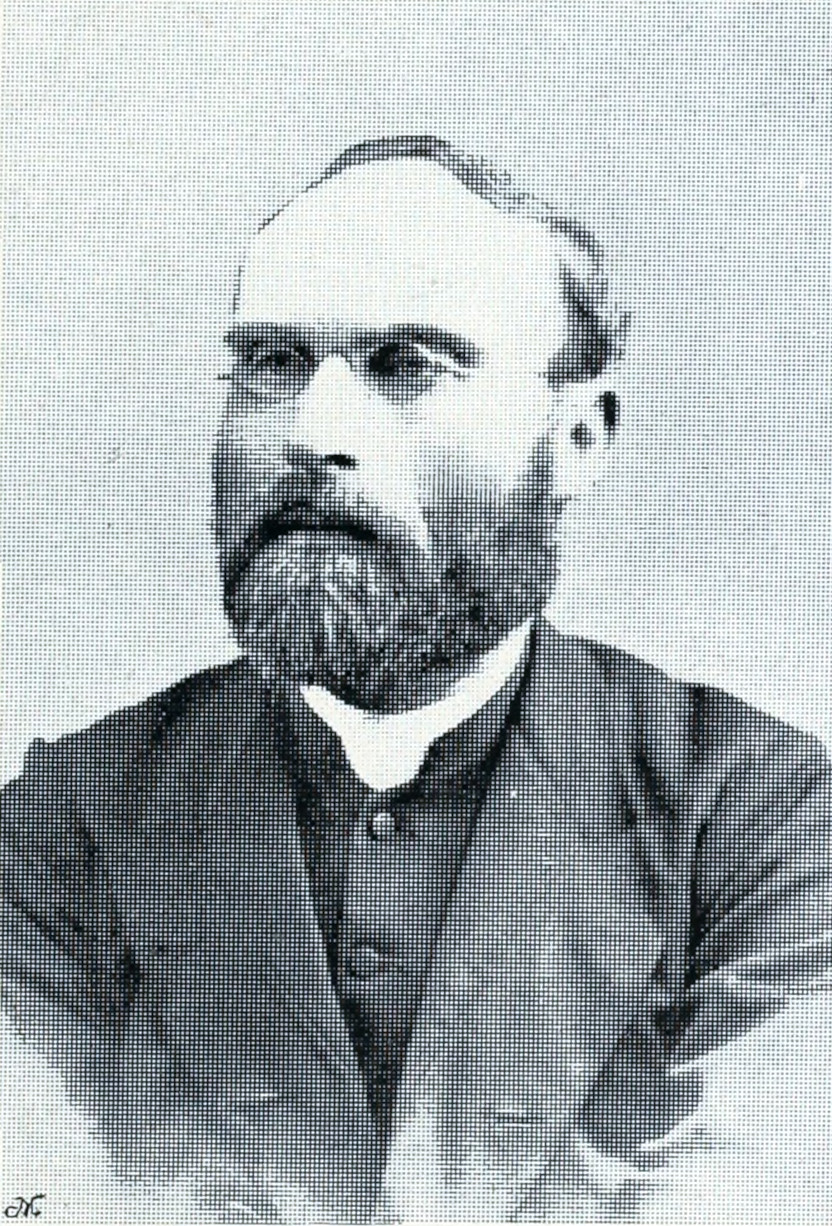
John Chalmers - Beith's successor at the Free North Church, Stirling

Beith retired from the active service of the church in Stirling in 1876 but continued to take part in the general work of the denomination. Towards the end of 1876 Beith intimated his intention of retiring from the active duties of the pastorate, and on 26 April 1877, John Chalmers of Ladyloan Free Church, Arbroath, was inducted as colleague and successor. Beith having removed to Edinburgh, attached himself to the Free St. George's congregation.

== Death and burial ==
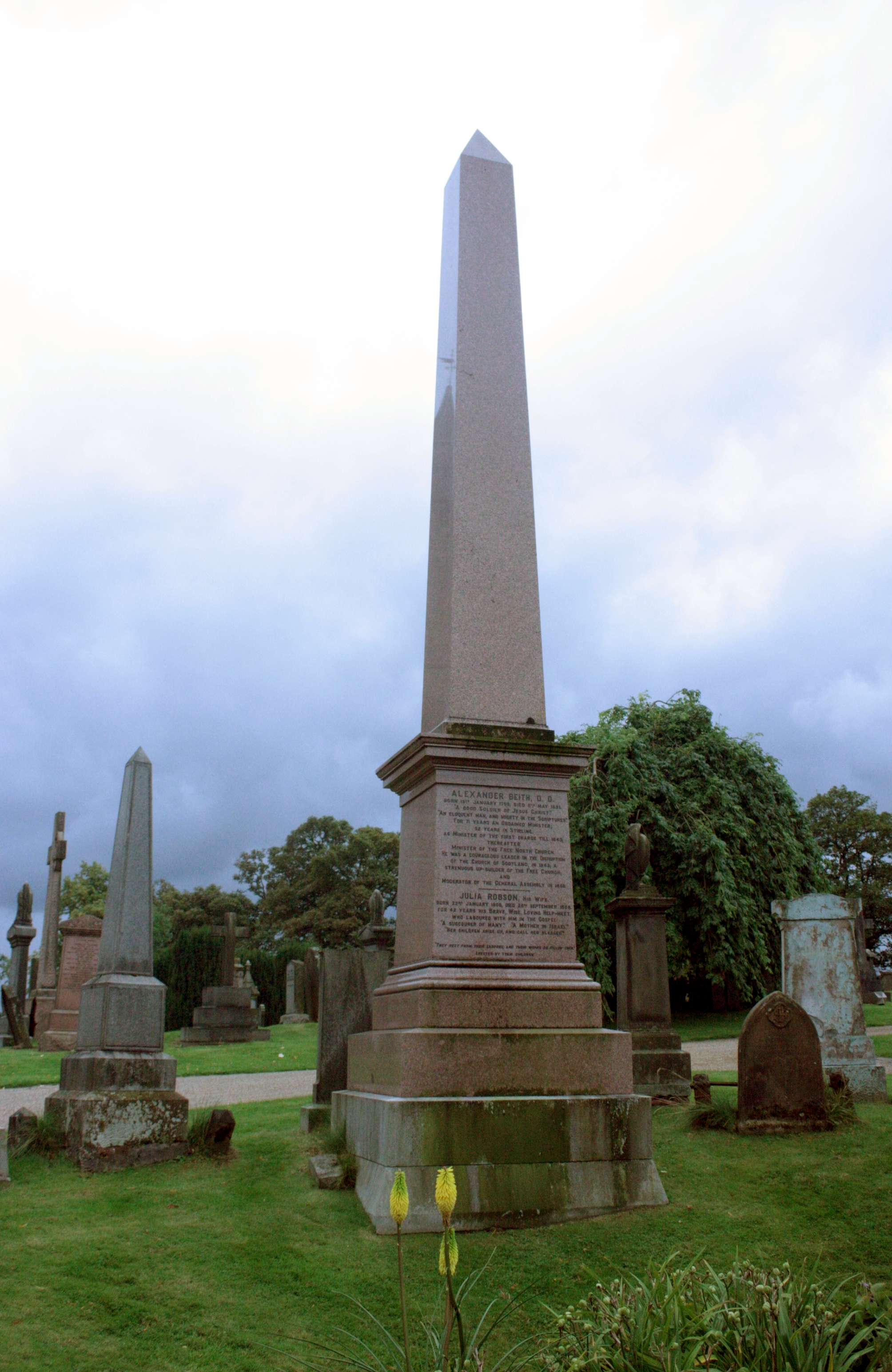
Beith's grave, Valley Cemetery, Stirling

He died at Edinburgh on 11 May 1891. He is buried in Valley Cemetery attaching the Church of the Holy Rude in Stirling near the southern roundel where a very tall obelisk with inscriptions overshadows the statue of James Guthrie.

== Family ==
By his wife Julia Robson (d. 25 Sept. 1866) he had fourteen children: six sons and eight daughters. His eldest son, Gilbert, was member of parliament for Glasgow Central, 1885, and for Inverness Burghs, 1892-5. Another son, John Alexander, was a justice of the peace and closely connected for many years with philanthropic and educational work in Manchester; he died in October 1896. Both brothers were partners in the well-known firm of Beith, Stevenson, & Co., East India merchants, Glasgow and Manchester.

== Artistic recognition ==
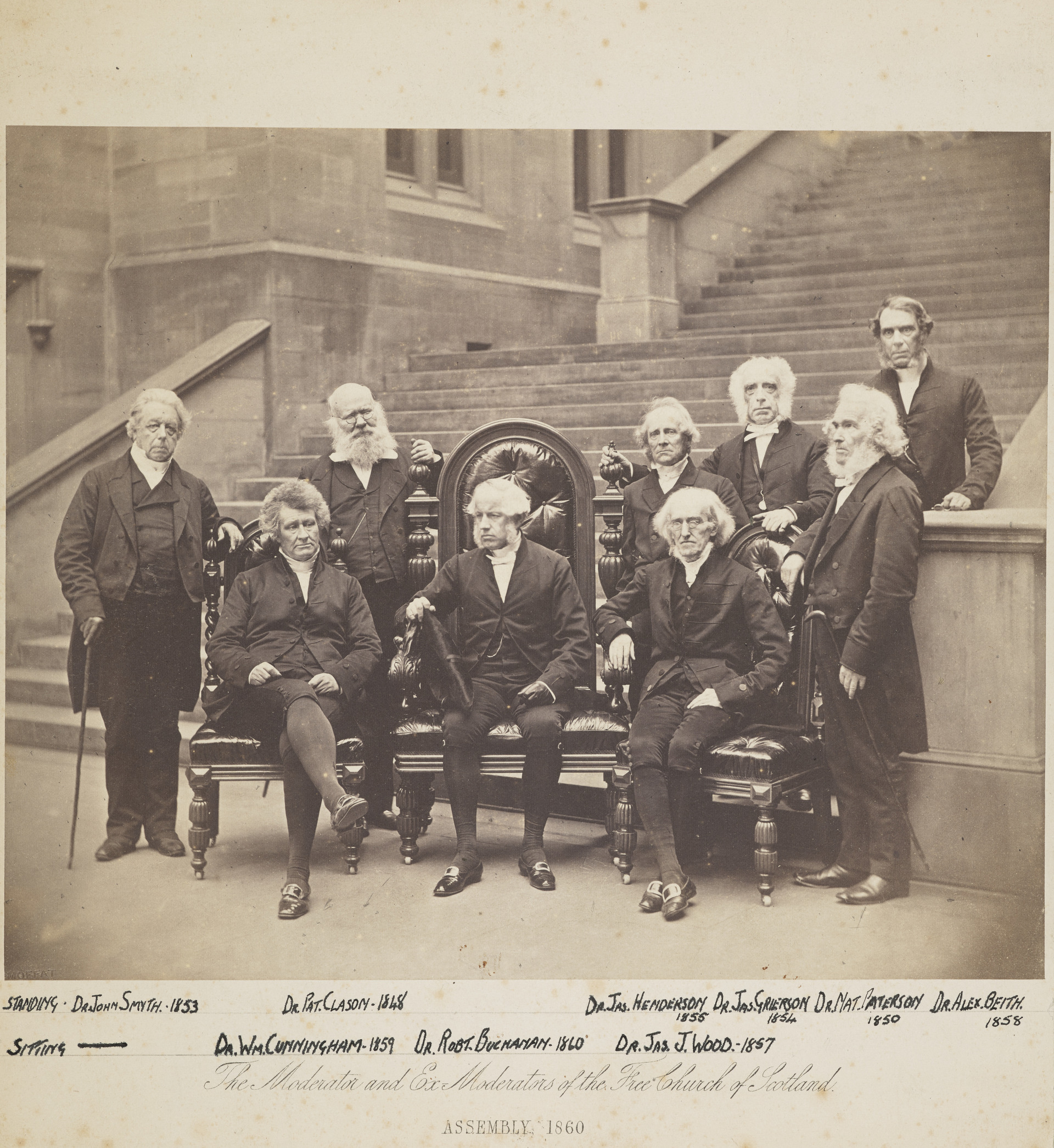
The Moderator and Ex Moderators of the Free Church of Scotland, Assembly; 1860. Pictured, from left to right, are (standing) John Smyth, Patrick Clason, James Henderson, James Grierson, Nathaniel Paterson and Beith (behind); (seated) William Cunningham, Robert Buchanan and James Julius Wood.

Beith was photographed in 1860 at the foot of the steps to New College with several other ex-Moderators of the Free Church.

A portrait of Beith, painted by Norman MacBeth, was presented to him by his congregation in Stirling and passed into the possession of his son Gilbert in Glasgow.

== Works ==
Beith was a voluminous writer. Besides many pamphlets on public questions, he published:

- On the Baptist Controversy, in Gaelic (1823)
- A Catechism on Baptism, in Gaelic (1824)
- Sermon at Opening of Synod Glasgow, (1834)
- The Compulsion of the Gospel, a sermon (Edinburgh, 1837)
- Account of the Revivals of Religion in the Isle of Skye (1837)
- Sorrowing yet Rejoicing, a Narrative of successive Bereavements in a Minister's Family [anon.] (Edinburgh, 1839)
- The Two Witnesses traced in History (Edinburgh, 1846)
- Letter to Patrick Arkley, Esq. (Edinburgh, 1846)
- Letters to the Author of the Eight Vials (Edinburgh, 1849)
- Biographical Sketch of the Rev. A. Stewart, Cromarty [in The Tree of Promise] (1854)
- Christ our Life, being a Series of Lectures on the first Six Chapters of John's Gospel 2 vols. (London, 1856-8)
- Disruption Facts and Principles (Stirling, 1859)
- Scottish Reformers and Martyrs (London, 1860)
- The Scottish Church, in her Relations to other Churches at Home and Abroad (Edinburgh, 1869)
- To the Men of the North (Edinburgh, 1876)
- Account of the Parish (New Stat. Acc, xiv.)
- Sermon LII. (Free Church Pulpit, i.)
- A Highland Tour with Dr Candlish (1874)
- Memoirs of Disruption Times (1877)
- The Woman of Samaria (1880)
