= Robert Foot =

Former Director-General of the BBC

Robert Foot OBE MC

3rd and 4th Director-General of the BBC
- In office 26 January 1942 – 31 March 1944 Serving with Cecil Graves (1942–1943)
- Preceded by: Frederick Ogilvie
- Succeeded by: William Haley

Personal details
- Born: Robert William Foot; 7 June 1889
- Died: 2 April 1973 (aged 83) Haslemere, Surrey, England
- Education: Winchester College

Robert William Foot OBE MC (7 June 1889 – 2 April 1973) was Director-General of the BBC, first jointly with Cecil Graves from 26 January 1942 to 6 September 1943 and then solely until he resigned on 31 March 1944. Before joining the BBC, Foot was a general manager at Gas Light and Coke Company. After being succeeded by William Haley, he became Chairman of the Mining Association.

== Life and career ==
Foot was born in 1889 and educated at Winchester College. He started his career in 1912 as a solicitor in Calcutta, India, working for the firm of Orr, Dignam and Company. During the First World War, he served in Belgium and France with the Royal Field Artillery. He was mentioned in dispatches on two occasions, and later received an OBE and Military Cross for his service.

In 1919, he began working for the Gas Light and Coke Company, appointed by David Milne Watson. From 1928 to 1941, he held the position of General Manager.

During the Second World War, he acted as a government advisor on organisation within the BBC. In 1942, he was appointed joint Director-General with Cecil Graves. The following year, Graves retired due to poor health, and Foot served as sole Director-General. He was not well-suited to the role and left the post in 1944.

Succeeded by William Haley, Foot became chairman of the Mining Association of Great Britain. He also later served as president of the British Coal Utilisation Research Association. Foot believed that nationalization was a bad idea. During his tenure at the Mining Association, he visited many mines personally to better understand miners' issues. In 1945, he published A Plan for Coal.

In 1947, he was promoted to President of the Mining Association, a position he held until 1952. He also served as the chairman for Powell Duffryn Technical Services and Wankie Colliery Company, and director of Barclays and the Australia and New Zealand Banking Group. After a short time in South Africa, Foot retired in England. He was a member of the court of assistance of the Worshipful Company of Haberdashers. He died aged 83 in Whitehanger Nursing Home, Haslemere, Surrey in 1973. He was married, with two sons and one daughter.

Media offices
Preceded by Frederick Ogilvie; 1938-1942	Joint Director-General of the BBC with Cecil Graves; 1942–1943	Succeeded by himself 1943-1944
Preceded by Cecil Graves and himself 1942-1943	Director-General of the BBC; 1943–1944	Succeeded by William Haley; 1944-1952
