= The Cardross Case =

19th-century court case in Scotland

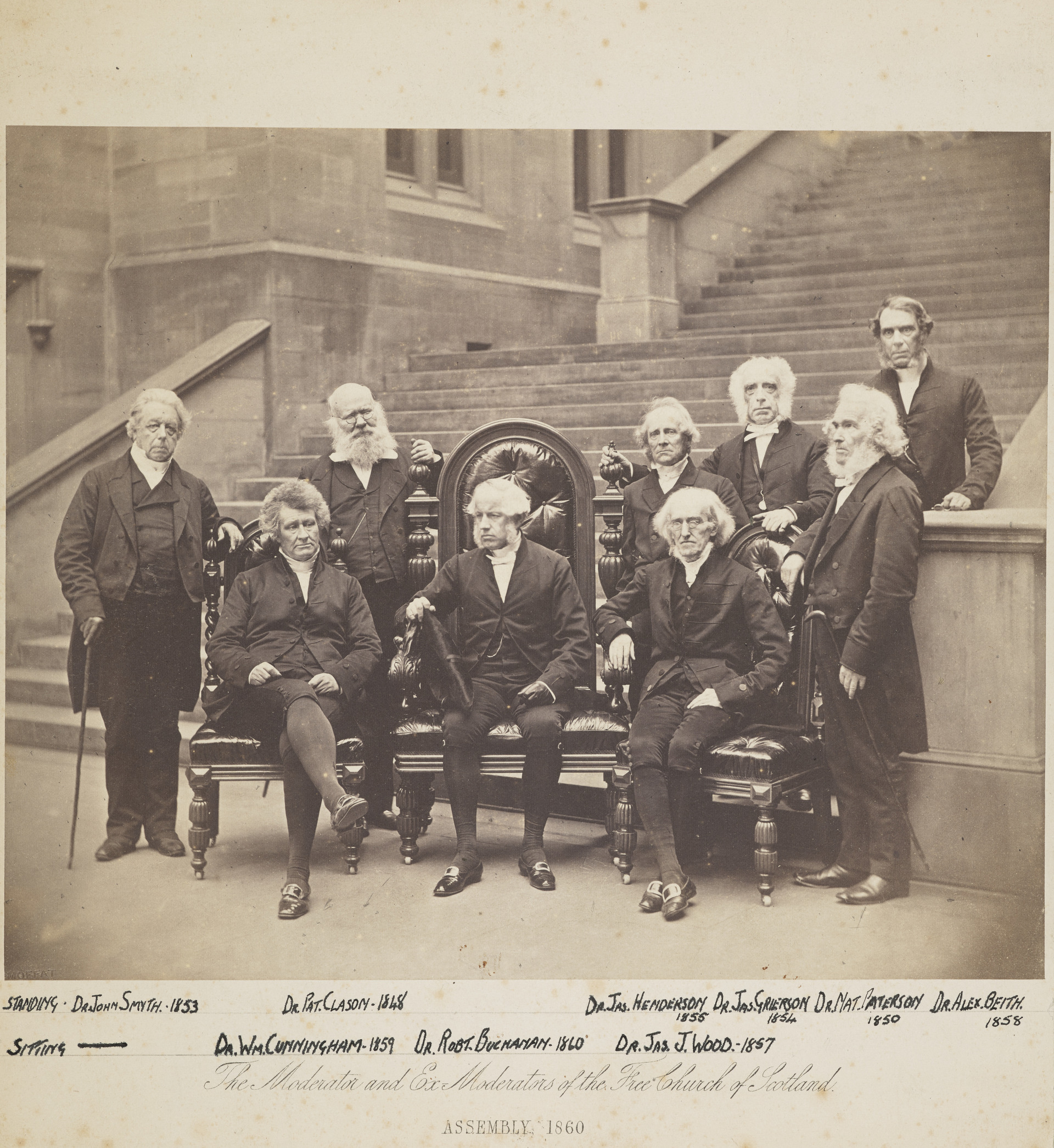
The moderators and ex-moderators of the Free Church of Scotland gathered together in 1860. Alexander Beith is the furthest to the right.

The Cardross Case was a 19th-century court case in Cardross in Scotland involving the Parish of Cardross and The Free Church of Scotland. It tested the limits between ecclesiastical and secular courts. The 19th century was an eventful period for Scottish religion and this case in many ways reverberated echoes from the Disruption of 1843. The case was reported on in media overseas, both in America and Australia.

The Reverend John MacMillan had left the parish of Ballachulish after the Disruption to serve as minister at Cardross.

The Case started in 1858 with the libelling of Mr. Macmillan before the Presbytery of Dumbarton on a charge of being drunk on the public road on two occasions, and of attempting on another occasion, when in a partially intoxicated condition, immoral behaviour in connection with a woman in the district. Alexander Beith was the moderator for the case.

Reverend Adam Mitchell Hunter who was ordained as minister of the Parish of Cardross in 1897 wrote an article about The Cardross Case in the journal Scottish Church History in 1941.
