= Beresford Clark =

British broadcaster

Sir John Beresford Clark, KCMG, CBE, FKC (2 December 1902 – 2 August 1968) was a British broadcaster.

== Biography ==
Clark was born in West Hartlepool, County Durham, in 1902, the elder son of Frederic and Lettia Clark. He was educated at Rydal School and King's College London (he became President of the University of London Union in 1924).

Beresford joined the British Broadcasting Corporation (BBC) at Cardiff in 1924. After working for the BBC in Cardiff as a Talks Assistant and at Manchester, he joined the Empire Service, becoming its Director in 1935. In the late 1930s, he travelled abroad widely to explore the use and advances of broadcast technology. In 1938, the Empire Service was reorganised into the Overseas Service and he became its first director, overseeing foreign language broadcasts in the wake of the 1938 Munich Crisis. In 1941, the Overseas and European Services were separated, with Clark remaining as Controller of the Overseas Service; between 1944 and 1945 he served as Temporary Controller of European Services. From 1948 to 1952, he was Deputy Director of Overseas Services (once again incorporating the European Service) and was then Director of External Broadcasting from 1952 to 1964, when he retired.

According to The Times, by the time of his death Clark had become, apart from Lord Reith, "the last of the B.B.C. pioneers. When he committed himself to the newly-born Overseas Service from which in the end so astonishing an effort and importance were to emerge in and after the Second World War, he was in the position of a man who 'lit matches on Dartmoor in a November gale hoping to find his way'". For his efforts in leading the Empire, European and Overseas services, he was appointed firstly a Commander of the Order of the British Empire (CBE) in 1942 and then a Knight Commander of the Order of St Michael and St George (KCMG) in 1958. He was also elected a Fellow of his alma mater King's College London in 1964. He had married Edith Margery Cotton, daughter of Alfred and Edith Cotton in 1932, but they had no children. She was a keen promoter of improving race relations in London, where the couple made their home. Sir Beresford died there on 2 August 1968. His "rich" private papers formed a major source-base for Asa Briggs' study of the development of British overseas and Empire broadcasting; Briggs dedicated the third volume of his History of Broadcasting in the United Kingdom to Clark.

Media offices
Preceded by Sir Ian Jacob	Director of External Broadcasting, BBC; 1952–1964	Succeeded by Tangye Lean
