= William Haley =

British newspaper editor and broadcasting administrator

Sir William Haley KCMG
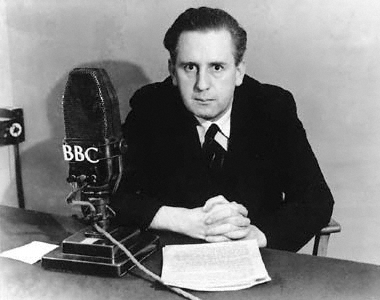
- Haley in 1942

5th Director-General of the BBC
- In office 1944–1952
- Preceded by: Robert Foot
- Succeeded by: Ian Jacob

Personal details
- Born: William John Haley; 24 May 1901 Jersey
- Died: 6 September 1987 (aged 86) Jersey
- Spouse: Susan Gibbons
- Education: Victoria College, Jersey
- Occupation: Editor and Director-General of the BBC

Sir William John Haley, KCMG (24 May 1901 – 6 September 1987) was a British newspaper editor and broadcasting administrator.

== Biography ==
Haley grew up on the island of Jersey and attended Victoria College. In 1918 he began to study journalism, and in 1921 he secured his first newspaper employment at The Times, eventually being stationed in Brussels.

Early in his career on the Manchester Evening News, Haley was found to be too shy to work as a reporter. He was then transferred to subediting. He rose through the ranks becoming director of Manchester Guardian and Evening News, Ltd after 8 years.

He served as Director-General of the BBC from 1944 to 1952 and from 1952 to 1966 he was editor of The Times. At The Times he wrote a series of light-hearted bookish articles under the pseudonym 'Oliver Edwards'. These articles were published in 1957 by Heinemann as 'Talking of Books'. While at the BBC he created the BBC Third Programme, which was replaced by BBC Radio 3 in 1967. He was made Knight Commander of the Order of St. Michael and St. George in the 1946 New Year Honours.

He was editor-in-chief of Encyclopædia Britannica from January 1968 until resigning in April 1969 in an editorial dispute over how to adapt the work to new readers. It was reported that younger executives (including the company's president, Charles E. Swanson) wanted to introduce livelier materials, while Haley favoured the traditional approach and an expansion in size.

Haley died in a nursing home in Jersey.

== Sources ==
Media offices
Preceded by Robert W. Foot	Director-General of the BBC; 1944-1952	Succeeded by Ian Jacob
Preceded by William Casey	Editor of The Times; 1952–1966	Succeeded by William Rees-Mogg
Preceded by Warren E. Preece	Editor-in-Chief of Encyclopædia Britannica; 1968-1969	Succeeded by Warren E. Preece
