= Packwood Haugh School =

Private school in Shropshire, England

Packwood Haugh

Location
- Ruyton-XI-Towns near Shrewsbury, Shropshire, SY4 1HX; England; 52.801°N 2.903°W

Information
- Type: Independent day and boarding Preparatory school
- Motto: Discas Dum Discere Possis (Latin: "Learn while you are able to learn")
- Religious affiliation: Church of England
- Established: 1892
- Chairman of Governors: David Stacey
- Headmaster: William Goldsmith
- Gender: Co-educational
- Age: 4 to 13
- Enrolment: 215
- Website: https://packwood.school//

Packwood Haugh School is a co-educational private preparatory school for pupils from the ages of 4 to 13, offering places for both day and boarding pupils. It is located in Ruyton-XI-Towns, midway between Oswestry and Shrewsbury in Shropshire, England.

== History ==
The school was founded in 1892 at Packwood, Warwickshire, and moved to its present site, a large Victorian country house previously called Park House, at Ruyton-XI-Towns, set in 66 acres (27 ha), in 1941. In 1956, it became a charitable trust. Girls joined the school in 1968 and a separate boarding house, Park House, provides boarding accommodation for girls. A pre-preparatory department, Packwood Acorns, was established in 1993 for day children only aged between four and seven and is also located within Park House. The rural site of 66 acres includes many facilities, such as a floodlit all-weather surface, a sports hall, purpose-built design and technology (DT) and art studios, an indoor swimming pool, science laboratories and a modern theatre. In 2019 the school united with Shrewsbury School, under which it is now an affiliate school.

== Curriculum ==
Through participation in a broad curriculum, centred on core literacy and numeracy skills that underpin all other subjects, pupils develop a good level of knowledge and understanding. Nearly all pupils stay at the school until they are 13, successfully gaining places in the senior schools of their choice, with a significant number gaining scholarships and awards. The curriculum is supported by a programme of extra-curricular activities such as pottery, cooking and debating. Additional external opportunities such as judo and scuba diving are also offered.

== Sport ==
There is a big games playing tradition at Packwood and a wide range of sports is available, with girls’ cricket, fencing, swimming, squash and riding enriching the core provision of football, rugby, hockey, netball cricket and lacrosse. Many pupils participate in local and national sporting competitions, with some achieving outstanding success in their chosen sport. Recent achievements have included top national rankings for boys and girls in under 11 and under 13 fencing competitions. Girls’ and boys’ cricket teams have both enjoyed strong results in local and regional matches, with many pupils selected for county squads and the girls’ team reaching the indoor cricket national finals.

== Alumni ==
- Tom James – double Olympic gold medal-winning rower
- Arthur Lewis Jenkins – soldier, pilot and war poet
- Alan Napier – actor
- Sir Frederick Wolff Ogilvie - Director-General of the British Broadcasting Corporation
- Rt Revd Mark Rylands – Bishop of Shrewsbury
- Christopher Gordon Horsfall Simon – British General Commissioner of Income Tax
