= Scottish religion in the nineteenth century =

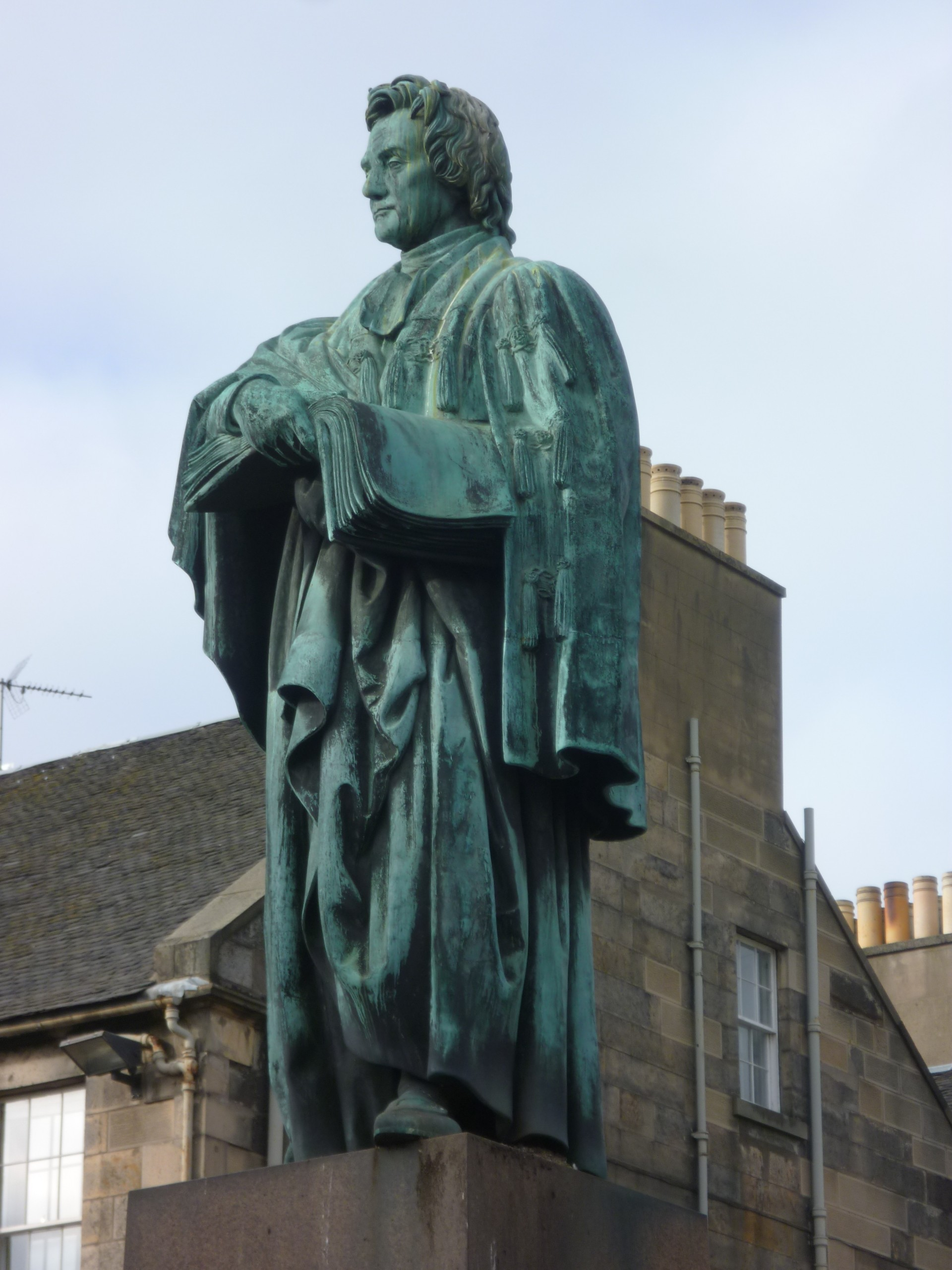
The statue of Thomas Chalmers in Edinburgh

Scottish religion in the nineteenth century includes all forms of religious organisation and belief in Scotland in the 19th century. This period saw a reaction to the population growth and urbanisation of the Industrial Revolution that had undermined traditional parochial structures and religious loyalties. The established Church of Scotland reacted with a programme of church building from the 1820s. Beginning in 1834 the "Ten Years' Conflict" ended in a schism from the established Church of Scotland led by Dr Thomas Chalmers known as the Great Disruption of 1843. Roughly a third of the clergy, mainly from the North and Highlands, formed the separate Free Church of Scotland. The evangelical Free Church and other secessionist churches grew rapidly in the Highlands and Islands and urban centres. There were further schisms and divisions, particularly between those who attempted to maintain the principles of Calvinism and those that took a more personal and flexible view of salvation. However, there were also mergers that cumulated in the creation of a United Free Church in 1900 that incorporated most of the secessionist churches.

Catholic Emancipation in 1829 and the influx of large numbers of Irish immigrants led to an expansion of Catholicism, with the restoration of the Church hierarchy in 1878. Episcopalianism also revived in the nineteenth century with the Episcopal Church in Scotland being organised as an autonomous body in communion with the Church of England in 1804. Other voluntary denominations included Baptists, Congregationalists and Methodists, which had entered the country in the seventeenth and eighteenth centuries, expanded in the nineteenth century and played a major part in religious and educational life, while the established church lost its monopoly over schooling and poor relief. The attempt to deal with the social problems of the growing working classes led to the rapid expansion of temperance societies and other religious organisations such as the Orange Order and Freemasonry. There were also missions at home to the Highlands and Islands and expanding urban centres and abroad, particularly to Africa, following the example of David Livingstone, who became a national icon.

== Church of Scotland ==
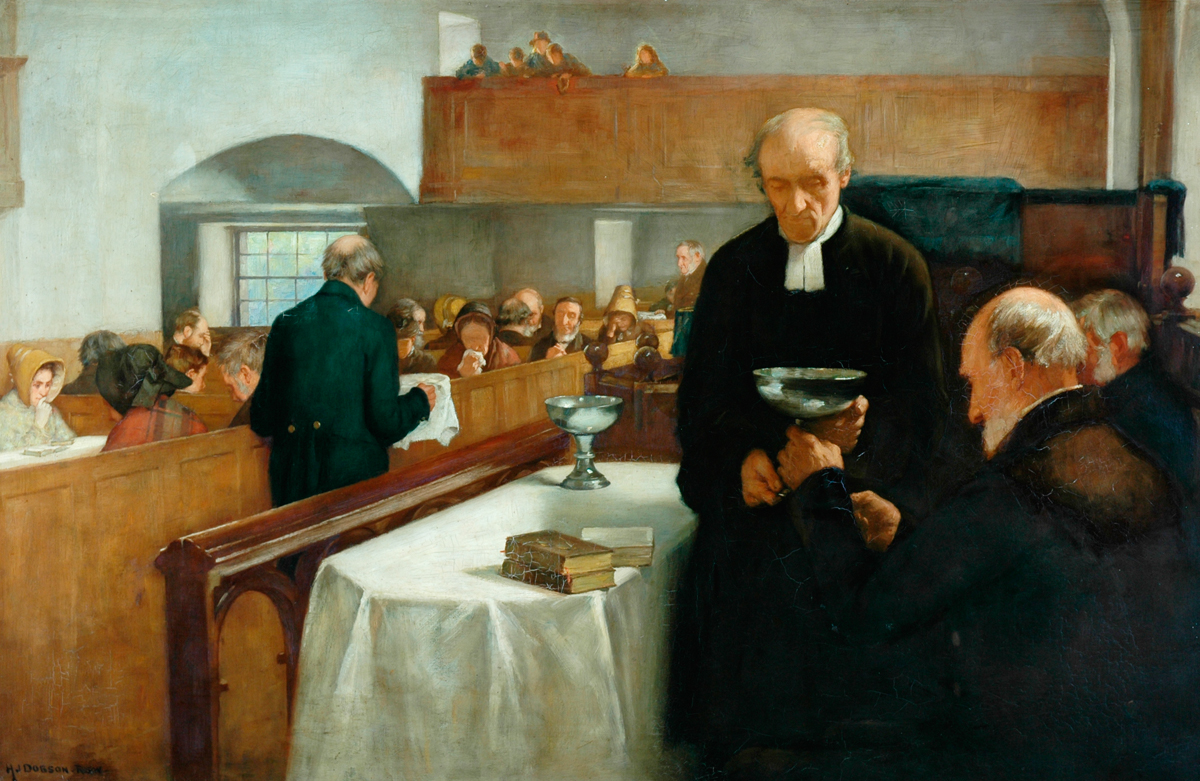
Henry John Dobson's A Scottish Sacrament

The rapid population expansion in the late eighteenth century and early nineteenth century, particularly in the major urban centres, overtook the system of parishes on which the established church depended, leaving large numbers of "unchurched" workers, who were estranged from organised religion. The Kirk began to concern itself with providing churches in the new towns and relatively thinly supplied Highlands, establishing a church extension committee in 1828. Chaired by Thomas Chalmers, by the early 1840s it had added 222 churches, largely through public subscription. The Church was increasingly divided between the Evangelicals and the Moderate Party. While Evangelicals emphasised the authority of the Bible and the traditions and historical documents of the kirk, the Moderates, who had dominated the General Assembly of the Church since the mid-eighteenth century, tended to stress intellectualism in theology, the established hierarchy of the kirk and attempted to raise the social status of the clergy. The major issue was the patronage of landholders and heritors over appointments to the ministry. Chalmers began as a Moderate, but increasingly became an Evangelical, emerging as the leading figure in the movement.

== Great Disruption ==
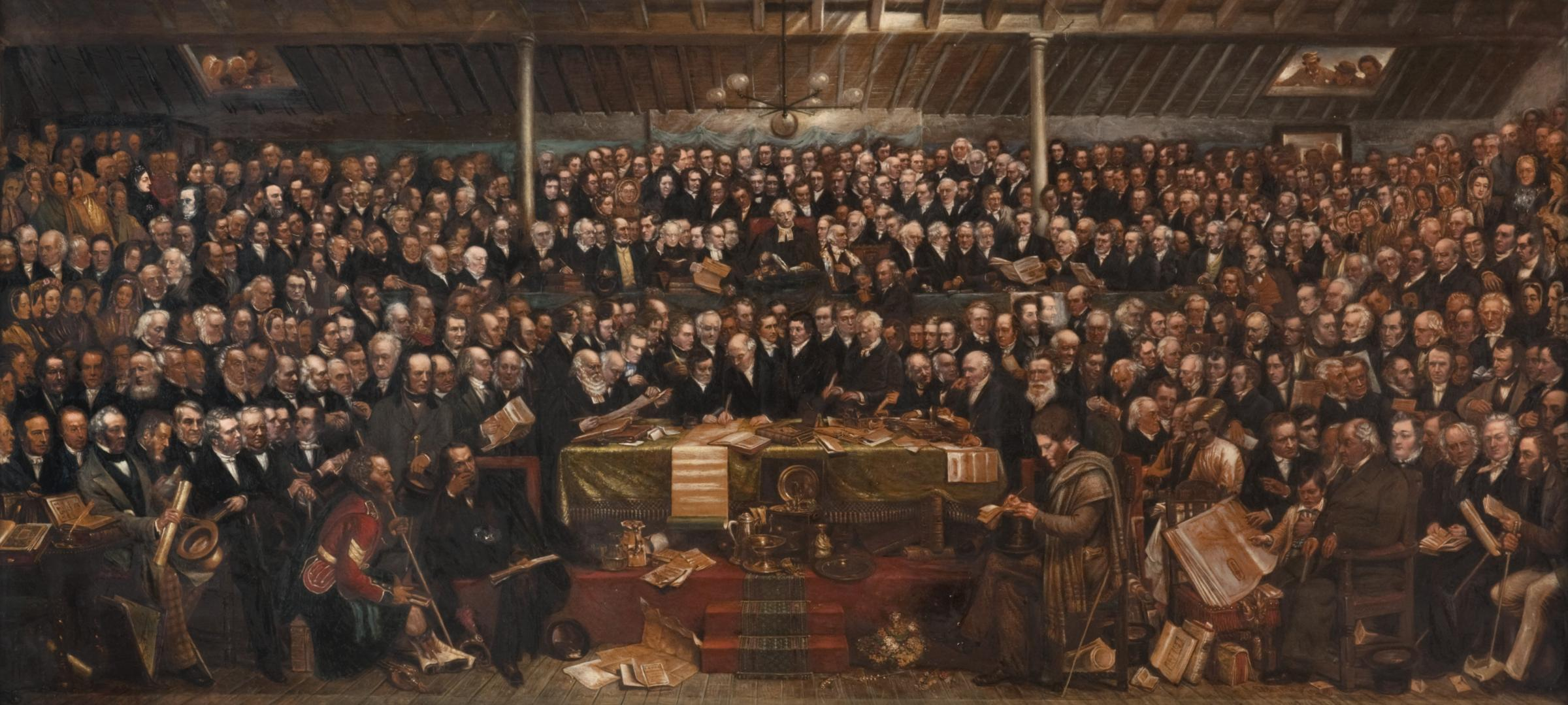
The Disruption Assembly, painted by David Octavius Hill

After prolonged years of struggle, in 1834 the Evangelicals gained control of the General Assembly and passed the Veto Act, which allowed congregations to reject unwanted "intrusive" presentations to livings by patrons and the Chapels Act, which put the ministers of Chapels of Ease on an equal footing with ordinary parish ministers. The following "Ten Years' Conflict" of legal and political wrangling ended in defeat for the non-intrusionists in the civil courts, reaching the Court of Session and then finally the House of Lords in 1839, which declared the acts unconstitutional. In 1842 Evangelicals presented to the General Assembly a Claim, Declaration and Protest anent the Encroachments of the Court of Session, known as the Claim of Right, that questioned the validity of civil jurisdiction over the church. When the Claim of Right was rejected by the General Assembly the result was a schism from the church by some of the non-intrusionists led by Thomas Chalmers, known as the Great Disruption of 1843.

Some 454, roughly a third, of the 1,195 clergy of the established church, mainly from the North and Highlands, formed the separate Free Church of Scotland. The Free Church was more accepting of Gaelic language and culture, grew rapidly in the Highlands and Islands, appealing much more strongly than did the established church, and where the groundwork had been laid by the Evangelical Revival that had begun in the eighteenth century and had entered a second wave, known as the Second Great Awakening, with events like the Kilsyth Revival in 1839.

Until the Disruption the Church of Scotland had been seen as the religious expression of national identity and the guardian of Scotland's morals. It had considerable control over moral discipline, schools and the poor law system, but after 1843 it was a minority church, with reduced moral authority and control of the poor and education. The established church took time to recover, but embarked on a programme of church building to rival the Free Church, increasing its number of parishes from 924 in 1843 to 1,437 by 1909.

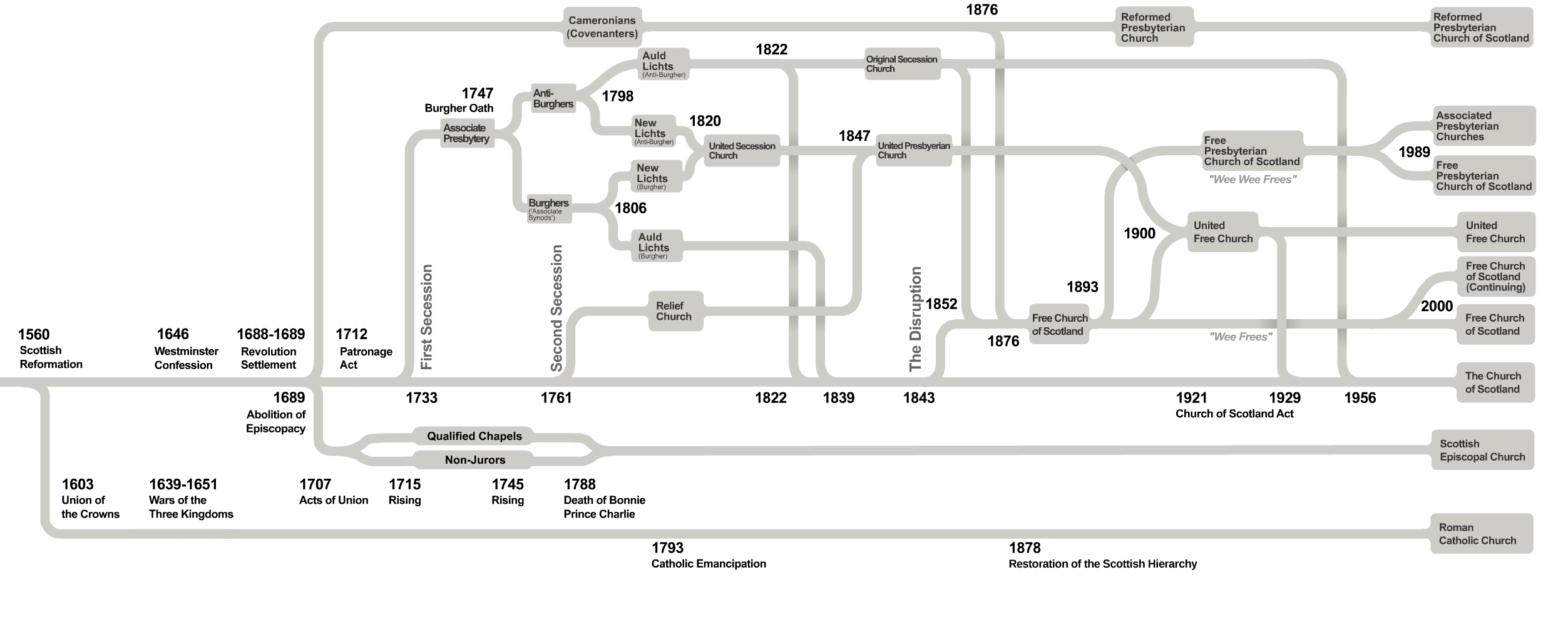
Timeline diagram showing the lineage of Scottish churches with various schisms and complex reunification's between 1560 and the present day

In 1860 there was a well publicized matter of charges against Reverend John MacMillan of Cardross which he refuted and numerously appealed which became known as the Cardross Case.

== Free Church ==
New College, Edinburgh, opened in 1844 and moved to its current site on completion in 1850

At the Disruption the established Church kept all the properties, buildings and endowments and Free Church ministers led services in the open air, barns, boats and one disused public house, sometimes having temporary use of existing dissenting meeting houses. However, with Chalmer's skills in financial organisation they created a voluntary fund of over £400,000 to build 700 new churches by his death in 1847 and 400 manses soon followed. An equal or larger amount was expended on the building of 500 parochial schools, and New College in Edinburgh for training clergy. After the passing of the Education Act of 1872, most of these schools were voluntarily transferred to the newly established public school-boards.

Chalmers's ideas shaped the breakaway group. He stressed a social vision that revived and preserved Scotland's communal traditions at a time of strain on the social fabric of the country. Chalmers's idealized small egalitarian, kirk-based, self-contained communities that recognized the individuality of their members and the need for cooperation. That vision also affected the mainstream Presbyterian churches, and by the 1870s it had been assimilated by the established Church of Scotland. Chalmers's ideals demonstrated that the church was concerned with the problems of urban society, and they represented a real attempt to overcome the social fragmentation that took place in industrial towns and cities.

In the late nineteenth century, the major debates were between fundamentalist Calvinists and theological liberals, who rejected a literal interpretation of the Bible. This resulted in a further split in the Free Church, sometimes called the Second Disruption, as the rigid Calvinists broke away to form the Free Presbyterian Church in 1893.

== Secession churches ==
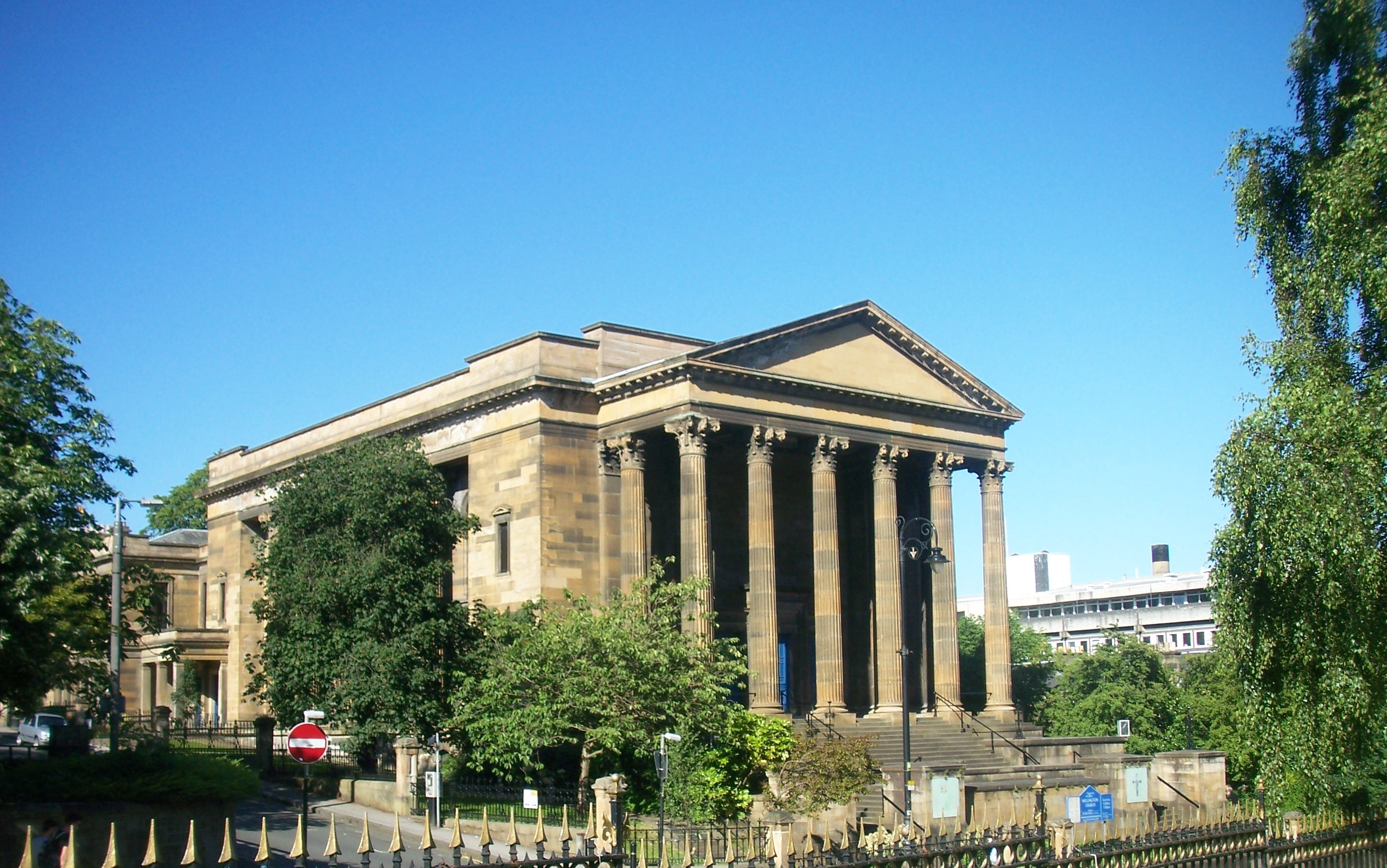
Wellington Church, Glasgow, built for the United Presbyterian Church in 1883-84 by the architect Thomas Lennox Watson

In the eighteenth century divisions within the Church of Scotland had led to the creation of the Associate Presbytery and Presbytery of Relief. The Associate Presbytery then split over the Burgess oath imposed after the Jacobite rebellion of 1745, with one faction forming the separate General Associate Synod. Between 1799 and 1806 the Old and New Light controversy, with the "Old Lichts" following closely the principles of the Covenanters, while the "New Lichts" were more focused on personal salvation, split both the Associate and General Associate Presbyteries. This paved the way for a form of reunification, as both the New Licht factions joined in 1820 to form the United Secession Church, which claimed to have 361 congregations and 261,000 followers at its inception. The secession churches had made headway in recruitment, and by 1830 30 percent of the Scottish population were members. They made particular advances in the major urban centres. In Glasgow in 1835-36 40 per cent of the population were members and in Edinburgh and it was 42 per cent.

== Reunions ==
In 1847 the United Secession Church was joined by the Presbytery of Relief to form the United Presbyterian Church. According to the religious census of 1851 it had 518 congregations and one in five of all churchgoers in Scotland. The Reformed Presbyterian Church had been established in 1743 from the remaining Cameronian congregations, which had refused to accept the Restoration of Episcopalianism in 1660 and had not re-entered the Church of Scotland when it was established on a Presbyterian basis in 1690. All but a remnant joined the Free Church in 1876. The Free Church of Scotland and the United Presbyterian Church united in 1900 to form the United Free Church. A small section of the Free Church, largely confined to the Highlands, rejected the union and continued independently under the name of the Free Church.

== Catholicism ==
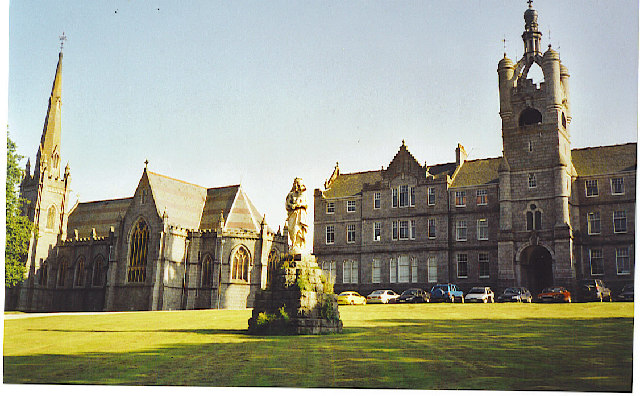
Blairs College, established as a Catholic Seminary in 1829

After the Reformation, Catholicism had survived as a mission, largely confined to the Highlands and Islands, but in the late eighteenth century declined in numbers due to extensive emigration from the region. In 1827 the mission was remodelled into Western, Eastern and Northern districts. Blairs College was established as a seminary in 1829. Catholic Emancipation in 1829 and the influx of large numbers of Irish immigrants, particularly after the famine years of the late 1840s, principally to the growing lowland centres like Glasgow, led to a transformation in the fortunes of Catholicism. The Church was initially unable to keep pace with the growth. By 1840 Glasgow had a Catholic population of 40,000, but only two churches and four priests to service them. A programme of church building and expansion of the priesthood began to catch up with the growth and by 1859 seven new churches had been built in the city. In 1878, despite opposition, a Roman Catholic ecclesiastical hierarchy was restored to the country, and Catholicism became a significant denomination within Scotland.

== Episcopalianism ==
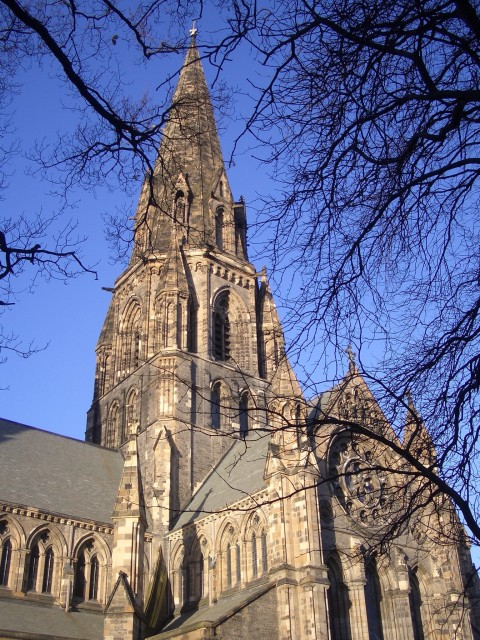
St Mary's Edinburgh, consecrated in 1879

The Episcopal Church had its origins in the congregations, ministers and bishops that did not accept the Presbyterian settlement after the Glorious Revolution in 1690 and among the Qualified Chapels of English and Scottish congregations that grew around Anglican worship in the eighteenth century. Having suffered a decline in fortunes as a result of its associations with Jacobitism in the eighteenth century it revived in the nineteenth century as the issue of succession to the throne receded, becoming established as the Episcopal Church in Scotland in 1804, as an autonomous organisation in communion with the Church of England. A strand of Evangelicalism developed in the church in the early nineteenth century, but in 1843, the same year as the Great Disruption, a group in Edinburgh under its leading figure David Drummond broke away to form a separate English Episcopal congregation, and the Evangelical party within the church never recovered. The church undertook a programme of rapid church building in the late nineteenth century, culminating in the consecration of St Mary's Edinburgh, which eventually became a Cathedral.

== Voluntary churches ==
In the nineteenth century the fragmentation of the established church and the Evangelical Revival meant that the country began to gain relatively large numbers of non-conformist organisations, many from England and the US, known in Scotland as voluntary churches, since they stood outside the established system and participation and any payments were voluntary. The Quakers had established themselves in Scotland in the seventeenth century and Baptist, Congregationalist and Methodist churches had appeared in the eighteenth century, but did not begin significant growth until the nineteenth century, partly because more radical and evangelical traditions already existed within the Church of Scotland and the free churches. The Congregationalists organised themselves into a union in 1812, the Baptists, who were divided into Calvinists and non-Calvinist tendencies, did the same in 1869. The Methodist Church had probably been limited by its anti-Calvinist theology, but made advances in the century, particularly in Shetland. From 1879, they were joined by the evangelical revivalism of the Salvation Army, which attempted to make major inroads in the growing urban centres. The Open and Exclusive Brethren entered Scotland in the late nineteenth century and the Open Brethren had 116 meetings in Scotland by 1884.

== Judaism ==
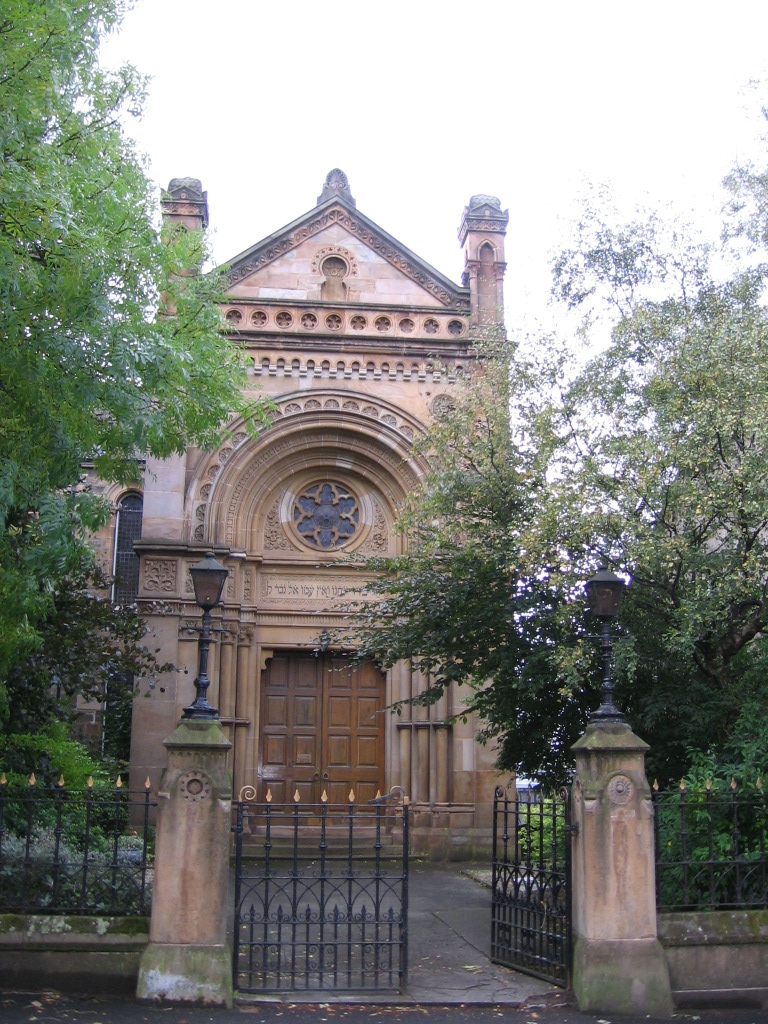
Garnethill Synagogue, built in 1879, in Glasgow

The first known Jews in Scotland were teachers of Hebrew at the universities in the seventeenth century. These were followed by merchants and tradesmen, mainly from Germany. The first Jewish congregation was founded in Edinburgh in 1816, and that in Glasgow in 1823. Scotland's first synagogue was set up in Edinburgh in 1825. Towards the end of the nineteenth century there was an influx of Jewish refugees, most from eastern Europe and escaping poverty and persecution. Many were skilled in the tailoring, furniture and fur trades and congregated in the working class districts of Lowland urban centres, like the Gorbals in Glasgow. The largest community in Glasgow may have been 1,000 strong in 1879 and had perhaps reached 5,000 by the end of the century. A synagogue was built at Garnethill in 1879. Over 8,000 Jews were resident in Scotland in 1903.

== Liturgical and musical revival ==
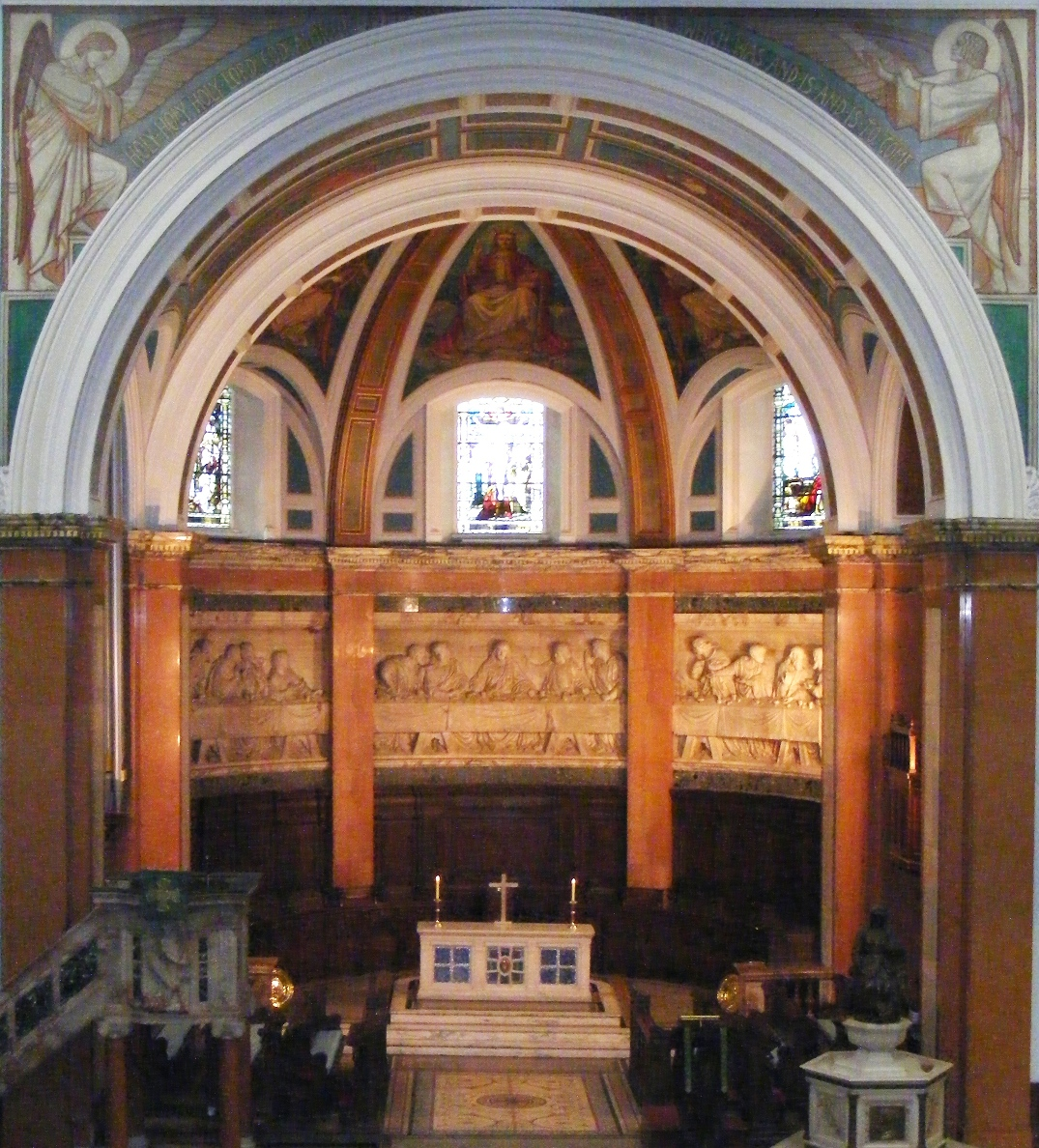
The interior of The Parish Church of St Cuthbert, Edinburgh, remodelled according to ecclesiological principles in 1894

There was a liturgical revival in the late nineteenth century that affected most of the major denominations. This was strongly influenced by the English Oxford Movement, which encouraged a return to Medieval forms of architecture and worship, including the reintroduction of accompanied music into the Church of Scotland. The revival saw greater emphasis on the liturgical year and sermons tended to become shorter. The Church of Scotland was among the first European Protestant churches to engage in liturgical innovation reflected in seating arrangements, abandoning box pews for open benches. From the middle of the century some of its churches, like Greyfriars in Edinburgh, began installing organs and stained glass windows, reflecting an attempt to return to forms of worship largely excluded since the late seventeenth century. The Church Service Society was founded in 1865 to promote liturgical study and reform. A year later organs were officially admitted to Church of Scotland churches. They began to be added to churches in large numbers and by the end of the century roughly a third of Church of Scotland ministers were members of the society and over 80 per cent of kirks had both organs and choirs. However, they remained controversial, with considerable opposition among conservative elements within the church and organs were never placed in some churches. At Duns the church was rebuilt (opened 1888) in a plan used in the Middle Ages, with a separate chancel, communion table at the far end, and the pulpit under the chancel arch. The influence of the ecclesiological movement can be seen in churches built at Crathie (opened 1893), which had an apsidal chancel raised above the level of the nave, a stone pulpit and a brass lectern, and St Cuthbert's, Edinburgh (rebuilt 1894), with a marble communion table in a chancel decorated with marble and mosaic.

In the Episcopalian Church the influence of the Oxford Movement and links with the Anglican Church led to the introduction of more traditional services and by 1900 surpliced choirs and musical services were the norm. The Free Church was more conservative over music, and organs were not permitted until 1883. Hymns were first introduced in the United Presbyterian Church in the 1850s. They became common in the Church of Scotland and Free Church in the 1870s. The Church of Scotland adopted a hymnal with 200 songs in 1870 and the Free Church followed suit in 1882. The visit of American Evangelists Ira D. Sankey (1840–1908), and Dwight L. Moody (1837–99) to Edinburgh and Glasgow in 1874-75 helped popularise accompanied church music in Scotland. The Moody-Sankey hymn book remained a best seller into the twentieth century. Sankey made the harmonium so popular that working-class mission congregations pleaded for the introduction of accompanied music.

== Popular religion ==
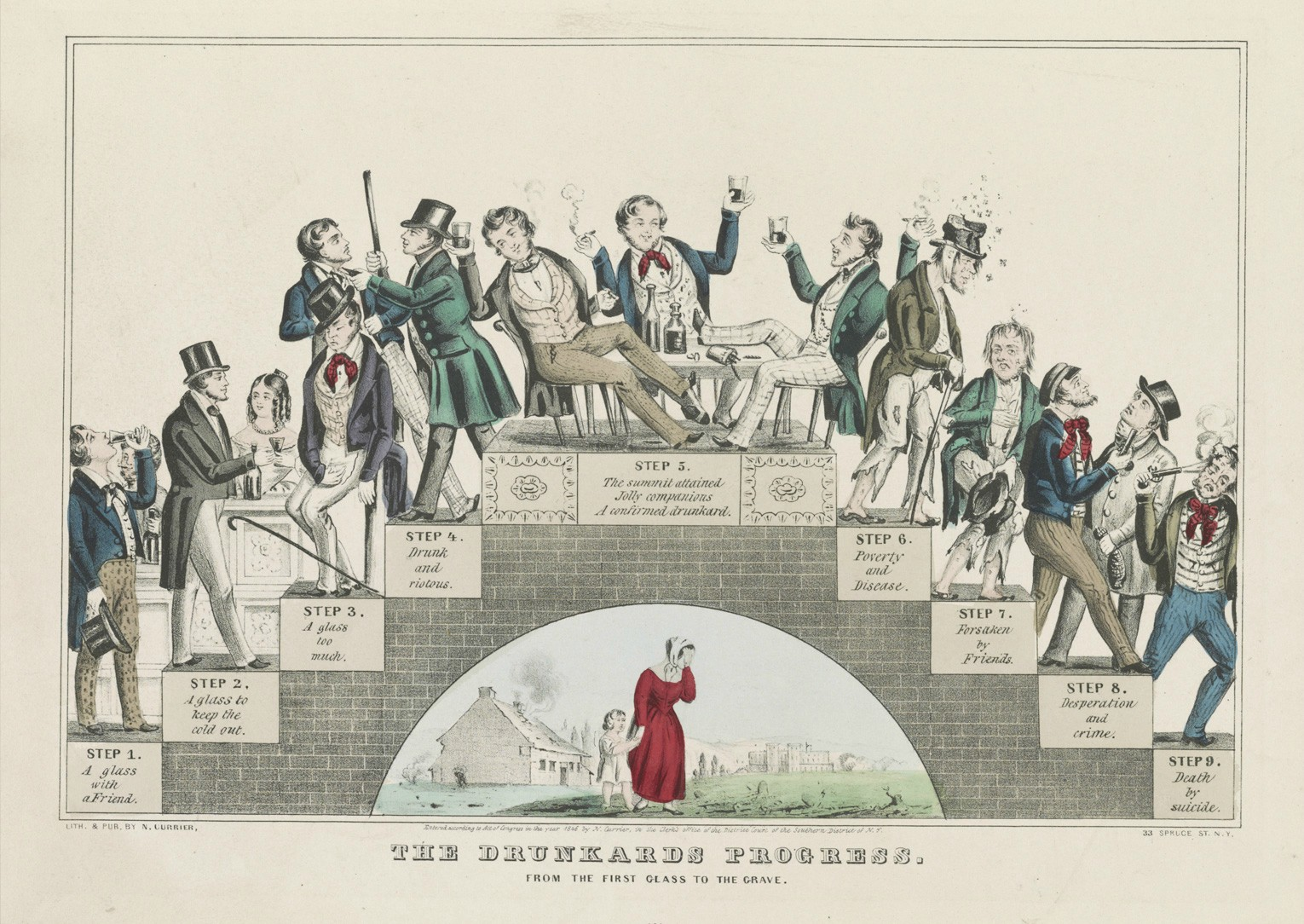
The Drunkard's Progress, an American lithograph from 1846, shows the stages of alcoholism that were common in temperance propaganda

=== Census of religion 1851 ===
The British government undertook a census of religion in Scotland in 1851, sending forms to ministers to report on attendance at all their services on Sunday, 30 March 1851. The final report included numerous estimates to fill in blank information. It showed the attendance of the Church of Scotland at 19.9 percent of the population; of the Free Church at 19.2 percent; the United Presbyterians at 11.7 percent; and of the others at 10.1 percent – or just over 60 percent in all.

=== Disruptions ===
Industrialisation, urbanisation and the Disruption of 1843 all undermined the tradition of parish schools. Attempts to supplement the parish system included Sunday schools. Originally begun in the 1780s by town councils, they were adopted by all religious denominations in the nineteenth century. By the 1830s and 1840s these had widened to include mission schools, ragged schools, Bible societies and improvement classes, open to members of all forms of Protestantism and particularly aimed at the growing urban working classes. By 1890 the Baptists had more Sunday schools than churches and were teaching over 10,000 children. The number would double by 1914. The problem of a rapidly growing industrial workforce meant that the Old Poor Law, based on parish relief administered by the church, had broken down in the major urban centres. Thomas Chalmers, who advocated self-help as a solution, lobbied forcibly for the exclusion of the able bodied from relief and that payment remained voluntary, but in periods of economic downturn genuine suffering was widespread. After the Disruption in 1845 the control of relief was removed from the church and given to parochial boards, but the level of relief remained inadequate for the scale of the problem.

The beginnings of the temperance movement can be traced to 1828–29 in Maryhill and Greenock, when it was imported from America. By 1850 it had become a central theme in the missionary campaign to the working classes. A new wave of temperance societies included the United Order of Female Rechabites and the Independent Order of Good Templars, which arrived from the US in 1869 and within seven years had 1100 branches in Scotland. The Salvation Army also placed an emphasis on sobriety. The Catholic Church had its own temperance movement, founding Catholic Total Abstinence Society in 1839. They made common cause with the Protestant societies, holding joint processions. Other religious based organisations that expanded in this period included the Orange Order, which had 15,000 members in Glasgow by the 1890s. Freemasonry also made advances in the late nineteenth century, particularly among skilled artisans.

== Home missions ==
A major emphasis of Evangelical Protestantism were organised missions. In the eighteenth century the focus had been the Highlands and Islands through the Royal Bounty provided by the government and the Society in Scotland for Propagating Christian Knowledge (SSPCK), which had 229 schools in the Highlands by 1795. Gaelic school societies were founded, beginning in Edinburgh in 1811, supporting travelling schools to the northern Highlands and western Isles. In 1797 James Haldane founded the non-denominational Society for the Propagation of the Gospel at Home, whose lay-preachers established independent churches across the Highlands. When Haldane and his brother Robert accepted the principle of adult baptism in 1808 most of them became Baptist chapels. The Congregational Union of Scotland was formed in 1812 to promote home missions. In 1827 the Baptists consolidated their efforts in the Baptist Home Missionary Society. In 1824 the government provided funds to build 32 churches and 41 manses in the Highlands. After the Disruption in 1843 most of the expansion was in new churches established by the Free Church.

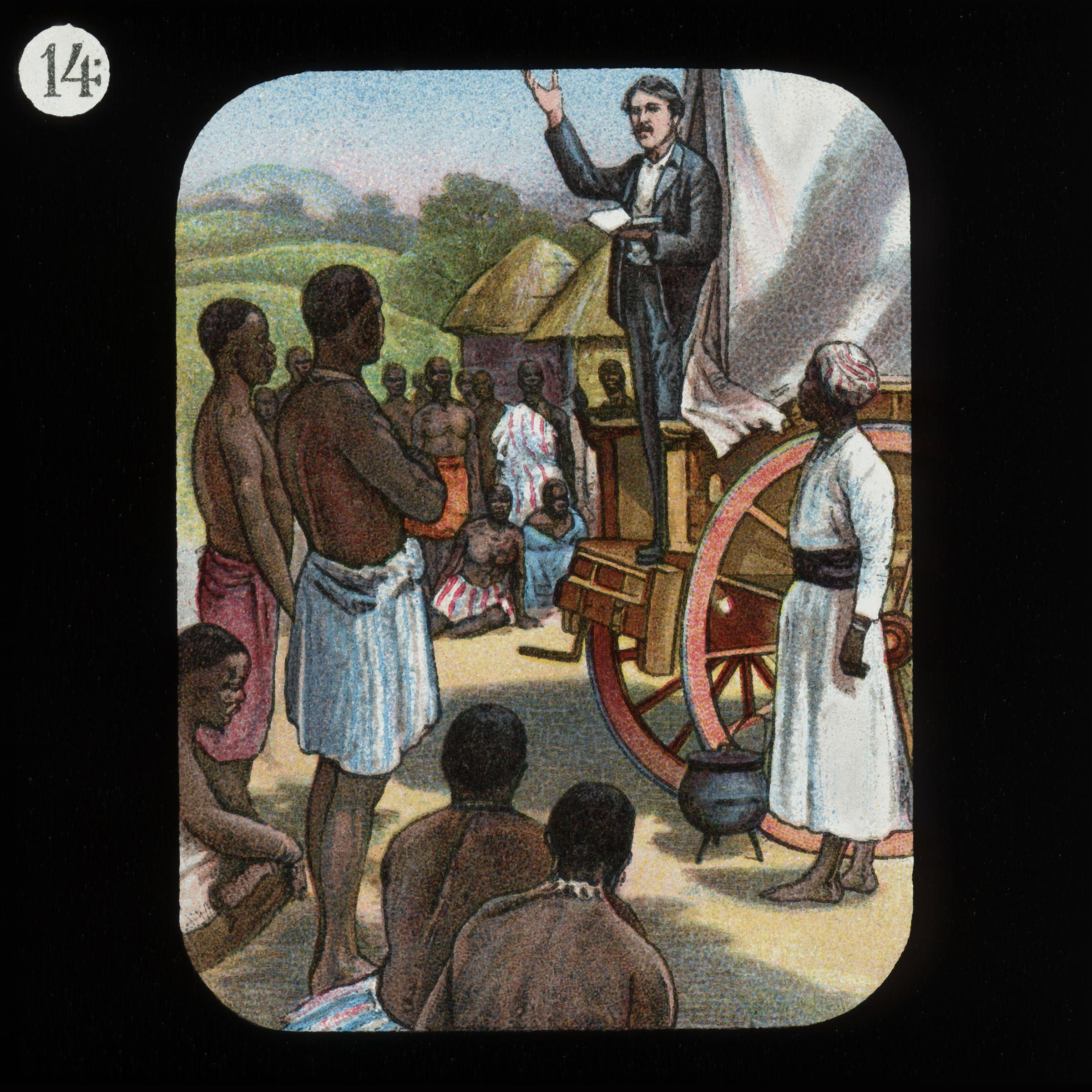
David Livingstone preaching from a wagon in one of the illustrations that were used at home to relate missionary work to audiences in Britain

Missions to fishermen and seamen began with the Seamen's Friend Societies. In the cities much of the work was interdenominational. The first urban mission was founded by David Nasmith in Glasgow in 1826 and drew on all the Protestant churches. Chalmers' experiment in St. John's, Glasgow, published in The Christian and Civic Economy of Large Towns (1821–26), provided a model of urban mission based on lay visitation. It was widely adopted by the Free Church after the Disruption and would be taken up by the Church of Scotland under the leadership of A. H. Charteris in the 1870s. The visit of American Evangelists Sankey and Moody in 1874-75 revitalised the Evangelical mission, leading to the founding of the Glasgow United Evangelistic Association. The Tent Hall was opened in the city in 1876, which hosted poor relief and evangelical meetings, and the Bible Training Institute for training lay evangelists was founded in 1892. Charteris was instrumental in the foundation of the Women's Guild in 1887, which underlined the role of women in the missions. They also acted as Biblewomen, reading scriptures, and in teaching Sunday schools.

== Overseas missions ==
The Scottish churches were relatively late to take up the challenge of foreign missions. The most famous Scottish missionary, David Livingstone, was not funded from his home country, but by the London Missionary Society. After his "disappearance" and death in the 1870s he became an icon of evangelic outreach, self-improvement, exploration and a form of colonialism. The legacy of Livingstone can be seen in the names of many mission stations founded following his example, such as Blantyre (the place of Livingstone's birth) for the Church of Scotland and Livingstonia for the Free Church, both now in Malawi.

David Clement Scott led the mission at Blantyre from 1881 and other extended family member including his brother, William Affleck Scott and Janet S. Beck followed. Scott was not trained as a builder or an architect but he oversaw the construction of impressive St Michael and All Angels Church, between 1888 and 1891.

As well as the cult of Livingstone, Scottish missionary efforts were also fuelled by the rivalry between different denominations in Scotland. The missions were popularised at home by publications and illustrations, often particularly designed to appeal to children, and through the new medium of the magic lantern show, shown to audiences in church halls throughout the country.
