= Adam Mitchell Hunter =

Scottish minister, mathematician, astronomer, and author of church history

Adam Mitchell Hunter (1871–1955) was a Scottish minister, mathematician, astronomer and author of church history.

== Life ==
He was born in Edinburgh in 1871. He was educated at George Watsons College then studied divinity at the University of Edinburgh and Marburg University in central Germany.

He was ordained in the Church of Scotland in 1897, and became minister of Cardross Parish Church. He simultaneously lectured in church history at both the University of Edinburgh and the University of Glasgow. In 1922, he left Cardross and took on the role of librarian at New College, Edinburgh. In 1923, he was elected a fellow of the Royal Society of Edinburgh. His proposers were James Young Simpson, Hector Macpherson, Charles Glover Barkla and John Alison. In 1941, he published an article about the Cardross Case. He resigned from the society in 1946.

Hunter died in 1955.

== Publications ==
- The Teachings of Calvin: A Modern Interpretation (1920)
- The Celebration of Communion in Scotland since the Reformation (1929)
- New College, Edinburgh: A Centenary History (1946)
- The Age of Daniel and the Exile
