= Goold =

Goold is a surname. Notable people with the surname include:

- Brian Goold-Verschoyle (1912–1942), Irish member of the Communist Party of Great Britain and spy
- Derrick Goold (born 1975), American author and sportswriter
- Elsie Goold-Adams (1882–1952), Australian Red Cross president in Queensland
- Fintan Goold (born 1986), Irish sportsperson
- Frederick Goold (1808–1877), Anglican priest in Ireland
- Wyndham Goold (1812–1854), Irish politician
- James Goold, Baron Goold (1923–1997), Scottish businessman and Conservative politician
- James Alipius Goold (1812–1886), Irish-Australian bishop
- John Goold (1941–2024), Australian rules footballer
- John Goold (physicist), Irish theoretical physicist
- Hamilton Goold-Adams (1858–1920), Irish soldier and colonial administrator, Governor of Queensland
- Mick Goold (1930–2005), Irish Gaelic footballer
- Patrick Goold (1814–1886), Irish member of the Parliament of the Cape of Good Hope
- Rita Goold, British psychic and spiritualist medium
- Rupert Goold (born 1972), English theatre director
- Sally Goold, Australia Wiradjuri nurse
- Stephen Goold (1817–1876), Australian politician
- Thomas Goold (c. 1766–1846), Irish lawyer and politician
- Vere St. Leger Goold (1853–1909), Irish tennis player, first Irish champion, later convicted murderer
- William Henry Goold (1815–1897), Free Church of Scotland minister

== See also ==
- Gould (name)
