= William Binnie (minister) =

Scottish minister

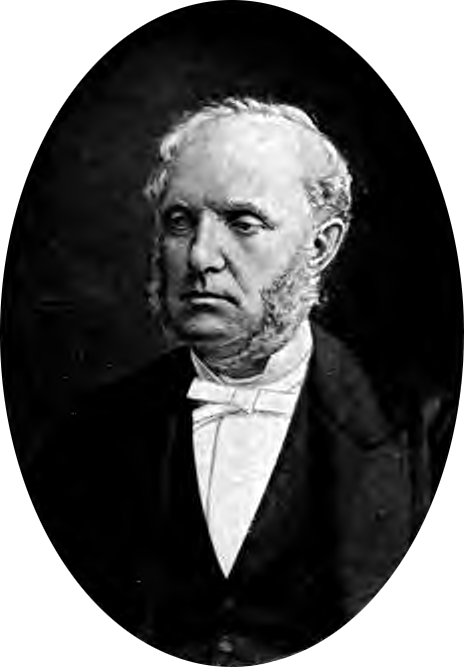
- from A Kirk and a College in the Craigs of Stirling
- Church: Stirling

Personal details
- Born: 20 August 1823
- Died: 22 September 1886 (aged 63)

minister of Stirling
- In office 24 May 1849 – 11 July 1839

Professor of Systematic Theology to the Reformed Presbytery Synod
- In office 1862 – 14 September 1875

Professor of Church History, Free Church of Scotland College, Aberdeen
- In office 14 September 1875 – 22 September 1886

William Binnie (1823-1886) was a presbyterian minister. He was Professor of Systematic Theology to the Reformed Presbytery Synod as well as being their minister in Stirling. On the breach in the Reformed Presbytery he joined the Majority Synod. In 1875 he was appointed to the Church History chair at the Free Church College in Aberdeen. He was an author publishing works on the Psalms and on the church.

== Life ==
William Binnie was born in Glasgow on August 20, 1823, the second son of an elder of the Church who took a prominent part in all its affairs. He was trained in Glasgow University, where he graduated M.A. in 1844, and at the Reformed Presbyterian Hall in Paisley, 1843–6. Next winter he proceeded to Berlin for a year, and there heard lectures by Neander and Hengstenberg. Illness shortened his term of study on the Continent, and he was forced to return home before he could take a second session. He was licensed by the Glasgow Presbytery on September 1, 1847, and on May 24, 1849, was ordained at Stirling.

During the course of his ministry at Stirling he maintained studious habits, and in 1862, on the death of Dr Symington, he was elected, by a large majority over two other nominees, to the chair of Systematic Theology in the Reformed Presbyterian Hall, which met for a session in the church of his youth before removing to Edinburgh. In 1860 the University of Glasgow recognised his scholarship by conferring the degree of D.D. upon him. In Stirling he added considerable service to the community to his congregational work, being chosen chairman of the School Board in 1873, an appointment he held till he left the town.

In 1875 the chair of Church History in Aberdeen Free Church College fell vacant, and under the Mutual Eligibility Act Dr Binnie was elected to the post by the General Assembly. Commissioners in support of the call appeared before the Presbytery of Glasgow on September 14, and Dr Binnie then formally accepted office. In loosing him from his chair and his congregation, the Presbytery recorded "the deep sense they entertain, and have long entertained, of his high excellence as a man, a Christian, a minister of the Gospel and a Professor of Theology." On leaving Stirling he was entertained to a public breakfast.

Professor Binnie died unexpectedly at Glasgow while on a visit, September 22, 1886.

== Family ==
He was married to Janet, sister of Rev. John Fairbairn of Allanton, who died before her husband in the same year.

He married 22 January 1850, Janet, (died 25 January 1886 aet. 64) daughter of Thomas Fairbairn, banker, Edinburgh, and had issue-

- Margaret, (married 4 April 1871 Rev. James Hunter, R.P.C. Falkirk)
- Thomas, manager of Scottish - American Mortgage Co., Edinburgh, baptised 9 August 1852
- Janet Agnes, born 12 September 1856
- Elisabeth, born 13 July 1858
- William, settler in Texas, born 15 April 1860
- John Fairbairn, medical author and surgeon in Kansas City, U.S.A., associate of Dr. W.J. Mayo, Professor of Surgery, Kansas University, Lt. Col. and surgical consultant to 3rd Army Corps, A.E.F., Limoges, France, wrote Manual on Operative Surgery, born 22 April 1863, died 28 November 1936 at San Diego, U.S.A.

== Publications ==
As an author Dr Binnie did not publish extensively. He is best known by his studies on The Psalms, which he issued in 1870, and by the volume in the "Bible Class Handbooks" on The Church, 1882. As Moderator of the Synod in 1860, he published his opening sermon on The First Christian Synod, which dealt with the then agitated state of the ecclesiastical world. In 1880 he wrote on The Proposed Reconstruction of the Old Testament Writings. He made occasional contributions to the periodical press.

A fuller list is given in Ormond.

- 1. The Church Discipline of the Scottish Reformation. Ter-Centenary of the Scottish Reformation as commemorated at Edinburgh, 1860. With Introduction by Dr Begg. Edited by Dr Wylie. Edinburgh, 1860.
- 2. The Spiritual Jurisdiction of the Church. With an Appendix on the Cardross Case. London; Edinburgh; and New York. 1860.
- 3. The First Christian Synod. A Sermon preached at the opening of the Reformed Presbyterian Synod in Edinburgh, May 6, 1861. Published at the request of Synod. T. Nelson A Sons. 1861.
- 4. Introduction to a new edition of "The Ecclesiastical Catechism" by Dr Alex. M'Leod, New York. Paisley : 1861.
- 5. The Psalms : Their History, Teachings, and Use. London: 1870.
- 6. Recent Attempts to Eliminate Supernatural Revelation from the Holy Scriptures. Lectures on Revealed Religion by Professors and Ministers of various Denominations. Delivered under the auspices of the Glasgow Y.M.C.A., 1872–8. With Preface by Dr. Jamieson. Glasgow. N.D.
- 7. Rev. William H. Goold, D.D., Martyrs' Free Church, Edinburgh; Disruption Worthies : A Memorial of 1843. Edinburgh, London.
- 8. Introduction, Notes and Questions to a new edition of Paley's "Horse Paulinae." London : 1879
- 9. The Proposed Reconstruction of the Old Testament History. Aberdeen. 1880.
- 10. The Church. Edinburgh : 1882. Handbooks for Bible Classes
- 11. Zinzendorf. Edinburgh : 1883 Lecture VII. Second Series of The Evangelical Succession Lectures, delivered in Free St George's, Edinburgh.
- 12. The Psalms. . . . A new edition, revised, enlarged, and compared throughout with the Revised Version of the Old Testament. London, 1886.
- 13. Sermons. London and New York, Posthumous.
