= William Binnie =

William Binnie may refer to:

- William Binnie (minister) (1823–1886), Scottish Presbyterian minister, academic and author
- William Binnie (architect) (1886–1963), Scottish architect
- William Binnie (engineer) (1867–1949), British civil engineer
- William Binnie (businessman) (born 1958), New Hampshire industrialist and investment banker
- Ian Binnie (William Ian Corneil Binnie, born 1939), puisne justice of the Supreme Court of Canada
- Brian Binnie (William Brian Binnie, 1953–2022), United States Navy officer
