= William Symington (minister) =

Scottish minister (1795–1862)

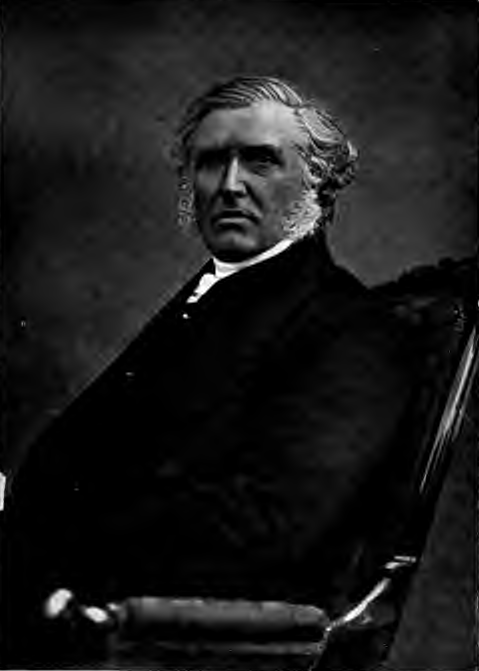
- from A Kirk and a College in the Craigs of Stirling
- Church: Paisley

Personal details
- Born: 2 June 1795 Paisley, Scotland
- Died: 28 January 1862 (aged 66)

minister of Stranraer
- In office 18 August 1819 – 11 July 1839

minister of Great Hamilton Street
- In office 11 July 1839 – 28 January 1862

Professor of Systematic Theology to the Reformed Presbytery Synod
- In office 1853–1862

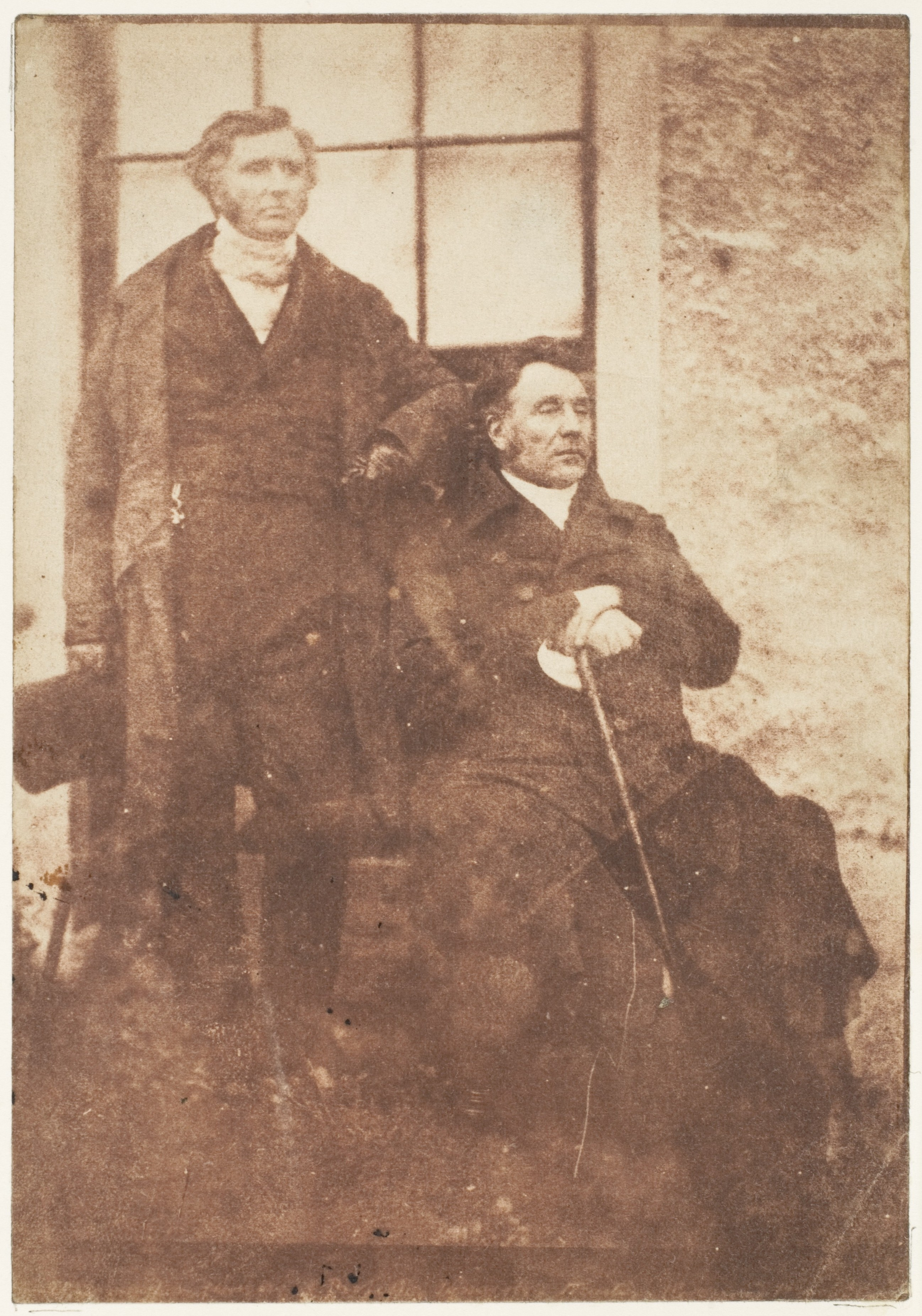
Andrew and William Symington by Hill & Adamson

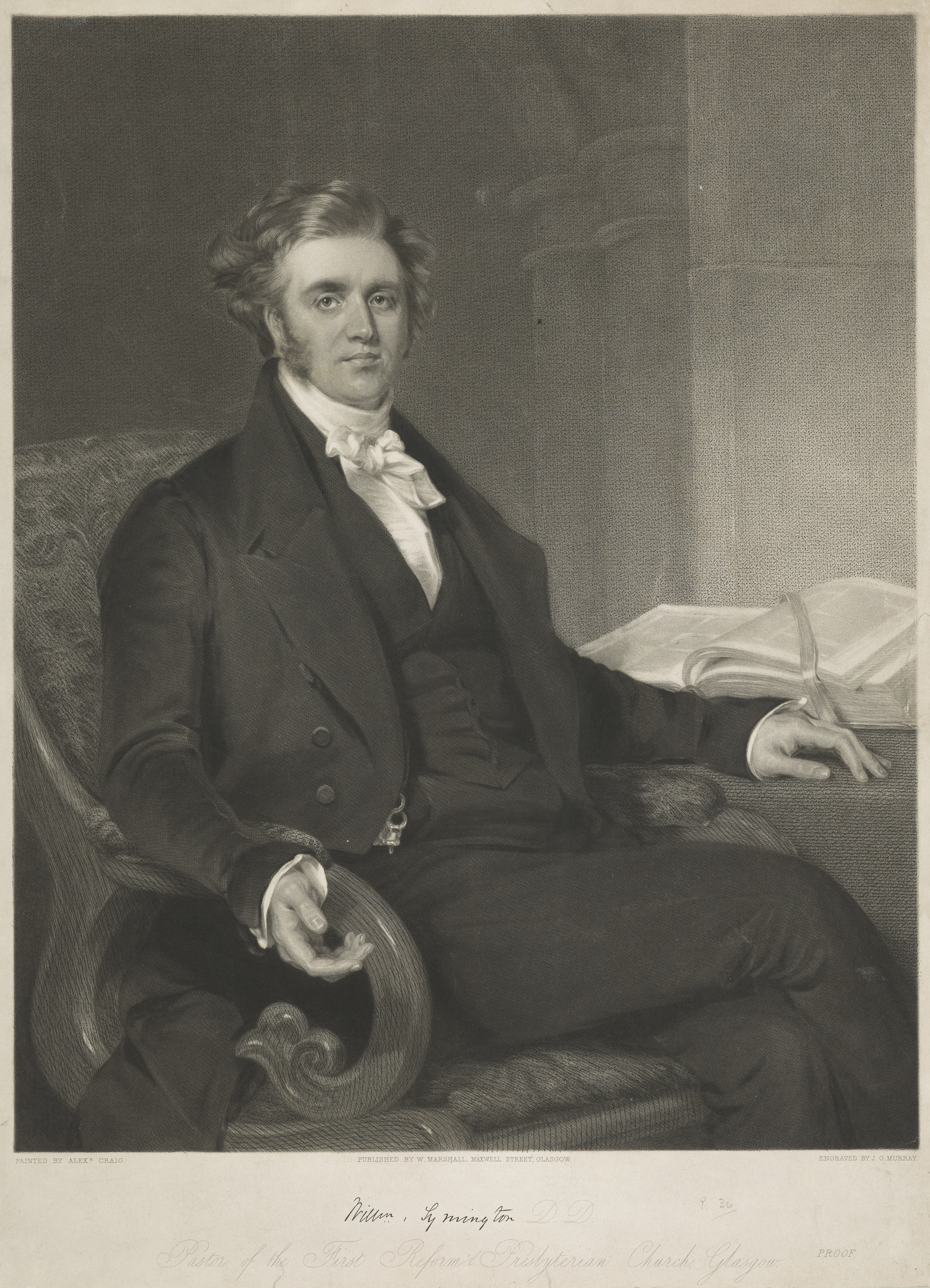
William Symington by Craig and Murray

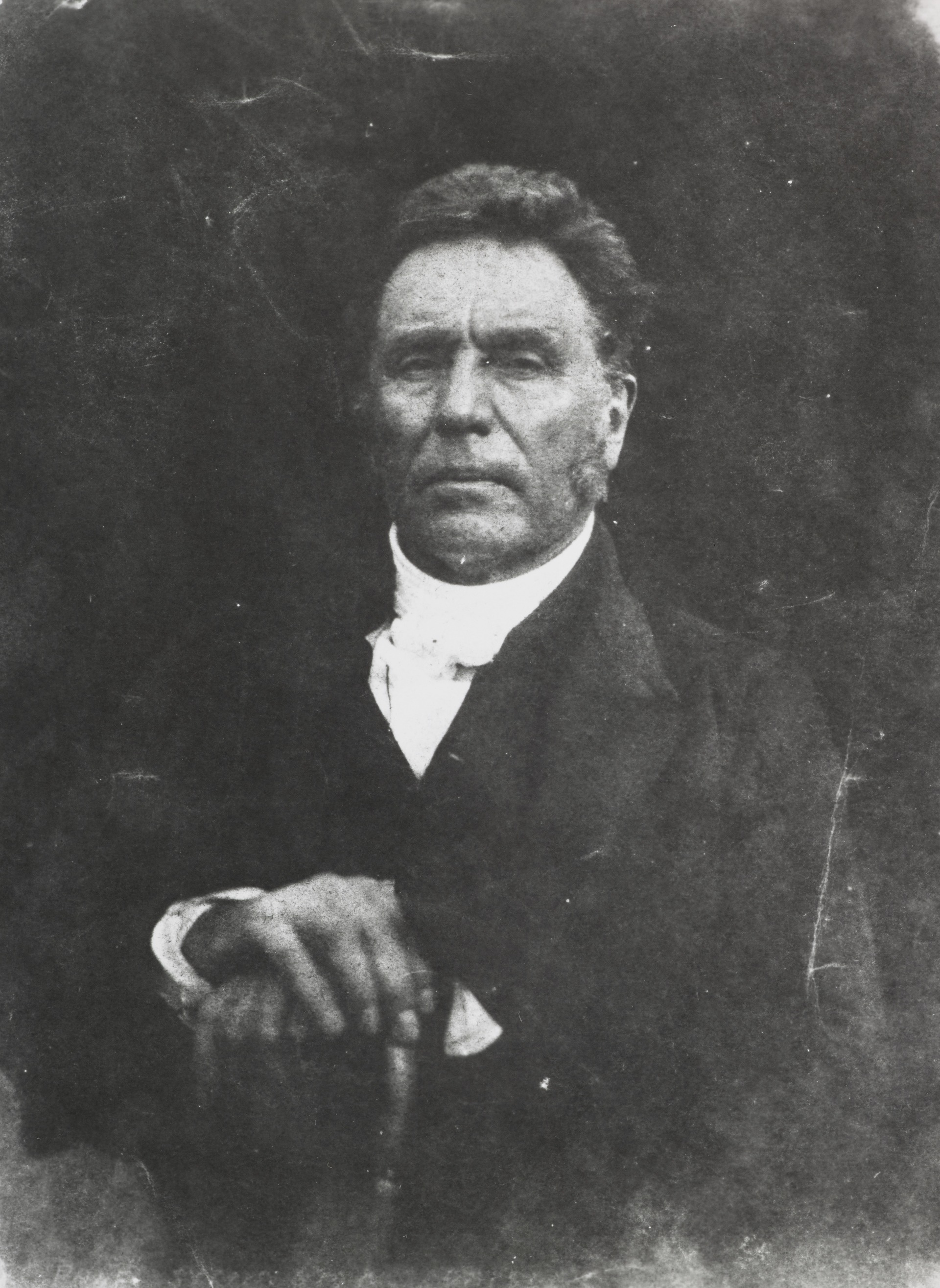
William Symington by Hill & Adamson

William Symington (2 June 1795 – 28 January 1862) was a Scottish minister. In 1853 he was appointed a professor of theology in the Reformed Presbyterian Church of Scotland. He took a deep interest in Bible circulation, home and foreign missions, and other religious movements.

== Life ==
William Symington was born in Paisley on 2 June 1795 to William and Marion; he had an older brother, Andrew Symington. In his youth he attended a private school and Paisley Academy. In 1810 he took classes at Glasgow University and spent the sessions 1814–17 at the Hall at Stirling. He was licensed by the Western Presbytery on 30 June 1818. Two calls were presented to him at the Synod of 1819: Airdrie and Stranraer - he accepted Stranraer. He was ordained on 18 August 1819.

On a vacancy occurring in Great Hamilton Street, Glasgow he was elected on 5 March 1839, although there was a considerable feeling in the Church against "transportations", and a minority was opposed to him on that account. He had already been twice chosen for West Campbell Street in the same city but the Synod had refused to present one call and he had declined the other. He was inducted on 11 July 1839.

In 1839, he published his book, "Messiah, the Prince"; was created D.D. by the University of Edinburgh; and removed from Stranraer to Glasgow. From that time to 1862 Great Hamilton Street Church had a Christian orator for its minister.

Symington was a friend of Thomas Chalmers. The proposal in the Senatus of Edinburgh University to confer the degree of D.D. on Symington was proposed by him, and seconded by David Welsh. He received the degree of D.D. from Edinburgh in 1839.

When the Disruption came Symington sympathised largely with the movement and walked in the historical procession from St. Andrew's Church to Cannonmills. When people wondered why Symington did not then join the Free Church, he said, "With a great sum they purchased their freedom, but I was free-born."

Symington's ministry in Glasgow resulted in an increase in the membership of the congregation, which reached nearly 1000. One of his missionaries in Glasgow was John G. Paton, D.D., afterwards of New Hebrides. On the death of his brother in 1853 he was elected to the Chair of Systematic Theology. In 1855 he was under the necessity of applying for a colleague, but it was not till March 3, 1859, that his son, William, was settled over the congregation. He died on January 28, 1862, and was buried in the necropolis of Glasgow.

His life motto was 'To God Alone be Glory'.

== Family ==
On 27 June 1820, he married Anne Spiers. Two of their sons entered the ministry - William and Alexander - and a daughter became the wife of William Henry Goold of Edinburgh. They had the following children -

- Margaret Spiers (married W. H, Goold, Reformed Presbyterian Church, Edinburgh)
- William, Reformed Presbyterian Church Glasgow
- Robert (22 August 1825 – 31 August 1833)
- Marion (married Matthew Clark, Glasgow)
- Andrew, Glasgow, (married Felicia Colquhoun)
- Alexander Macleod, Reformed Presbyterian Church, Dumfries
- Agnes Anne (married William McCormick, Dumfries)

Symington's father was a merchant and a member of the Reformed Presbyterian Church, and his brother Andrew Symington was a preacher in the same denomination. Another brother, Robert Brown Symington, was the father of Andrew James Symington (born 1825), author of Harebell Chimes and other books of poetry.

== Publications ==
Symington's contributions to literature included a number of fugitive pieces which he published while in Stranraer, but his chief works are The Atonement and Intercession of Jesus Christ, Edin., 1834, and Messiah the Prince, Edin., 1839.

The 1881 edition of Messiah the Prince contains a biography of William Symington.
