= Fintan Goold =

Irish Gaelic footballer

Personal information
- Native name: Fiontán de Gúl (Irish)
- Born: 1986 (age 39–40) Cork, Ireland
- Occupation: Chemical Engineer
- Height: 1.85 m (6 ft 1 in)

Sport
- Sport: Gaelic Football
- Position: Midfield
Club
- Years: Club
- 2003-: Macroom
Inter-county
Years	County	Apps (scores)
2005-2016	Cork	18 (0-8)
Inter-county titles
- Munster titles: 4
- All-Irelands: 1
- NFL: 3
- All Stars: 0

Fintan Goold (born 1986 in Macroom, County Cork) is an Irish sportsperson. He plays Gaelic football with his local club Macroom and has been a member of the Cork senior inter-county team since 2005. He is also the brother of physicist John Goold.

== Playing career ==
=== Club ===
Goold plays his club football with his local club in Macroom. He first came to prominence as a member of the club's under-21 team in the early 2000s. He lined out in the final of the county under-21 championship in 2006, however, Beara were the winners on that occasion. Goold lined out in a second consecutive county final in that grade in 2007, however, on this occasion Castlehaven defeated Macroom. Goold has enjoyed success with his club by captaining them to Intermediate County success in 2010 by defeating Kildorrery.

=== Minor & under-21 ===
Goold first came to prominence on the inter-county scene as a member of the Cork minor football team in the early 2000s. He lined out in his first Munster final in that grade in 2003, however, Kerry were a much better team and won the game by 1–14 to 0–10.

Goold was still eligible for the minor grade again in 2004. That year Cork contested another provincial decider, however, after a draw and a replay Cork were defeated by Kerry by 0–13 to 1–7.

In 2005 Goold also became a member of the Cork under-21 football team. He won a Munster title in that grade that year, however, Cork were subsequently defeated in the All-Ireland semi-final.

In 2006 Goold captured a second consecutive Munster under-21 winners’ medal, however, an All-Ireland medal eluded him. He made it three Munster titles in-a-row in 2007; however, on this occasion Goold later added an All-Ireland medal to his collection.

=== Senior ===
Goold was just out of the minor grade when he became a key member of the county's senior football team. He was a key member of the team for the provincial championship campaign which Cork reached the final of. Reigning All-Ireland champions Kerry provided the opposition, however, Cork were no match for ‘the Kingdom’. The 1–11 to 0–10 defeat was not the end of the road as Cork still had another chance to claim the All-Ireland title. Kerry subsequently trounced their greatest rivals by 1–19 to 0–9 in the All-Ireland semi-final; however, Goold played no part in this game.

In 2006 Cork lined out against Kerry in the Munster final once again. That game ended in a 0-10 apiece draw. The replay saw a much fresher Cork team defeat Kerry by 1–12 to 0–9. James Masters proved the hero of the day, as he scored 1-7 and Goold came on as a substitute to win his first Munster title. The quirks of the championship saw Cork face Kerry again in the subsequent All-Ireland semi-final for the second year in-a-row. In a similar pattern to the previous year Cork failed to beat Kerry at Croke Park. A 0–16 to 0-10 resulted in Goold's side being dumped out of the championship.

In 2007 Cork narrowly lost their Munster crown to Kerry. In spite of the 1–15 to 1–13 defeat Cork still had another chance to claim the All-Ireland title. Cork later did well in the All-Ireland series and finally qualified for the championship decider. Reigning champions Kerry, however, were the opponents. Goold was not listed on the starting fifteen, however, he came on as a substitute during the match. While the first half was played on an even keel, 'the Kingdom' ran riot in the second half and a rout ensued. At the full-time whistle Cork were trounced by 3–13 to 1–9.

In 2008, Cork won the Munster title, beating Kerry in the final. It was Goold's second Munster winners' medal in three years. Kerry, however, again defeated Cork in a thrilling replay in the All-Ireland semi-final despite an outstanding performance by ‘the Rebels’.

== Honours ==
Cork

- Munster Senior Football Championship (4): 2006, 2008, 2009, 2012
- Munster Under-21 Football Championship (3): 2005, 2006, 2007
- National Football League Division 1 (3): 2010, 2011, 2012
- National Football League Division 2 (1): 2009
- All-Ireland Senior Football Championship (1): 2010
- All-Ireland Under-21 Football Championship (1): 2007

Club

- Cork Intermediate Football Championship (1): 2010
- Cork Minor A Football Championship (1): 2004

Awards

- Cadbury Under-21 Hero of The Future (1): 2007

Awards
Preceded by Keith Higgins (Mayo)	U21 Footballer of the Year; 2007	Succeeded by Killian Young (Kerry)
