= Charles Abercrombie Smith =

Cape Colony scientist, politician and civil servant

Sir Charles Abercrombie Smith
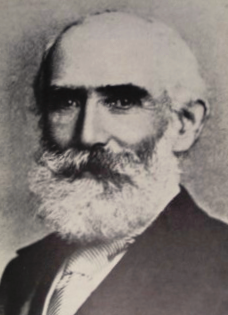
- Sir Charles Abercrombie Smith, Cape Auditor-General

Member of the Cape Colony Parliament Parliament for King Williams Town 1875
- In office 1866–1875

Minister of Crown Lands and Public Works
- In office 1872–1875
- Prime Minister: John Molteno
- Preceded by: Office created
- Succeeded by: John X. Merriman

Personal details
- Born: 12 May 1834 St Cyrus, Kincardineshire, Scotland
- Died: 1 May 1919 (aged 84) Wynberg, Cape Town
- Party: Liberalism
- Education: University of Glasgow
- Occupation: Scientist, politician and civil servant

Sir Charles Abercrombie Smith (12 May 1834 – 1 May 1919) was a Cape Colony scientist, politician and civil servant.

== Early life ==
Charles Abercrombie Smith was born on 12 May 1834 in St Cyrus, Kincardineshire, Scotland, and studied physics and mathematics at the University of Glasgow. In the 1850s he worked as an assistant to Lord Kelvin on experiments with thermo-electricity but, after a serious health breakdown, he emigrated and settled in the Cape Colony in 1860.

He initially working as a land surveyor in the Eastern Cape (near Kat River) for a few years, where he became somewhat acquainted with the Xhosa people, language and culture, as well as with the pressures on their communities. He developed an interest in systems of land tenure that might better enable the Xhosa to combat white settler encroachment, and in the development of Xhosa farming settlements using new crops and livestock. His 1864 proposal, with Charles Pacalt Brownlee, for individual land ownership to replace communal land tenure in Xhosa areas dates from this period.

== Political career ==
He entered the Cape Colony Parliament in 1866, representing King Williams Town. He was to hold this seat up until 1875, when he moved to the Cape's civil service.

In politics he was a liberal, like his fellow MP for King Williams Town Patrick Goold, favouring a non-expansionist policy to the frontier, and opposed to the pro-imperialist frontier "Separatist League". He was also a supporter of Saul Solomon's "Voluntarist" movement, which favoured the full separation of Church and State, and the removal of state support for Churches. He initially opposed the "responsible government" (locally elected government) movement, believing that the people of the Cape were not yet ready for this privilege. However the movement succeeded regardless, and the Cape attained its first elected executive in 1872.

In 1872, the Cape's first Prime Minister, John Molteno, appointed Smith to his cabinet as Commissioner (Minister) of Crown Lands and Public Works, in spite of Smith's opposition to his government. He was Commissioner at a time of extremely rapid economic and social development at the Cape, and did significant work on the reduction of public debt, the tender process, as well as education and infrastructure. By 1875 he was a supporter of responsible government and strongly opposed Carnarvon's attempt to impose a British confederation on southern Africa. Overall, he performed this role very competently, but without distinction.

== Auditor-General (1875-1903) ==
In 1875, in an unparalleled move, Molteno removed Smith from his cabinet and appointed him to the esteemed position of Auditor-General in the Cape's Civil Service. While this action was immensely controversial at the time, it was a great move for Smith's career. He produced a range of ground-breaking reports and papers, headed various commissions and became deeply involved in the founding of many of the Cape's most influential institutions.
Altogether, his work as Auditor-General was an immense success, and he remained in this position up until his retirement in 1903.

Nonetheless, serious concerns were raised in parliament about the appropriateness of politicians being moved into the civil service, and Smith's case was not replicated.

== Scientist ==
In his early political career, he spent a great deal of time furthering his studies in mathematics, contributing papers to the Quarterly Journal of Mathematics and serving as examiner for mathematics.

Smith helped to set up the Meteorological Commission of the Cape of Good Hope and for 37 years he was its chairman, overseeing enormous growth, up until the Union of South Africa in 1910.

He joined the council of the University of the Cape of Good Hope when it was established in 1873, even serving as vice-chancellor at times. He did considerable work in this capacity for the advancement of the natural sciences. He was also on the council of Diocesan College, Cape Town.

Smith was also keenly interested in philosophy, and he was involved in the South African Philosophical Society from its establishment in 1877. He also served as its treasurer until 1908, when he became a Fellow of the Royal Society of South Africa - newly amalgamated for the Union of South Africa. He was awarded an honorary Doctorate in Law (LLD) in 1917.

== Later life and family ==
In his private life, Smith's principle hobby was the study and appreciation of "the magnificent Cape flora" and he greatly enjoyed long walks through the Cape Fynbos. He was also a keen mountaineer in his younger days.

He only married very late in life, and did not have any children. He remained sickly throughout his life, and for his last years he was bed-ridden at "St Cyrus", his house in Wynberg. He was knighted in 1903, received an honorary doctorate in 1917, and died in 1919.

Political offices
Preceded by ???	Representative of King Williams Town; 1866–1875	Succeeded by ???
Preceded by Office created	Minister for Crown Lands and Public Works, Cape Colony; 1872–1875	Succeeded by John X. Merriman
Government offices
Preceded by E.M. Cole	Auditor General; 1875–1903	Succeeded by ???
