= Andrew Symington =

Scottish minister

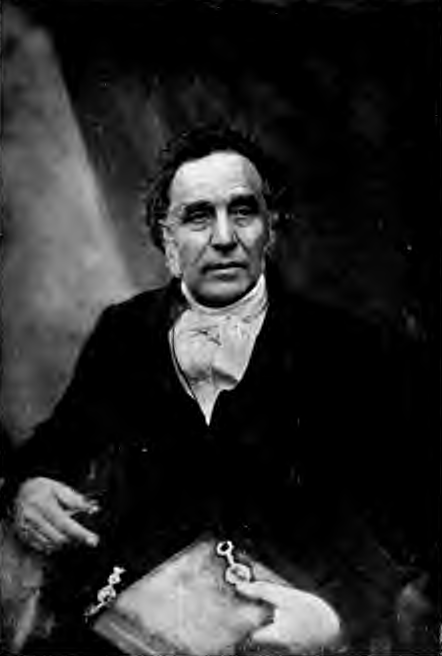
- from A Kirk and a College in the Craigs of Stirling
- Church: Paisley

Personal details
- Born: 26 June 1785
- Died: 22 September 1853 (aged 68)

minister of Paisley
- In office 26 April 1809 – 1853

Clerk to the Synod of the Reformed Presbytery Synod
- In office 1811–1822

Professor of Divinity to the Reformed Presbytery Synod
- In office 1820–1853

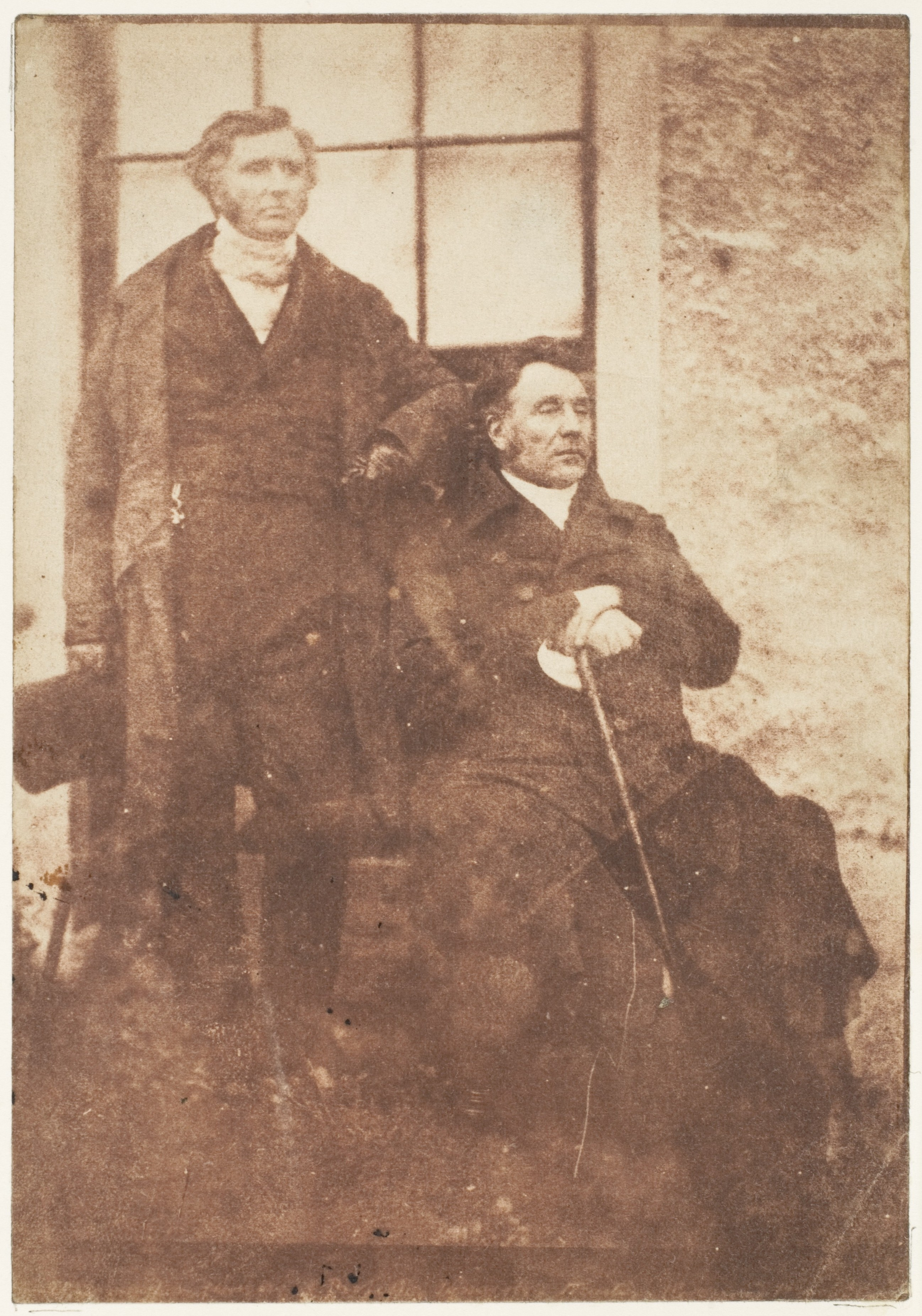
Andrew and William Symington by Hill & Adamson

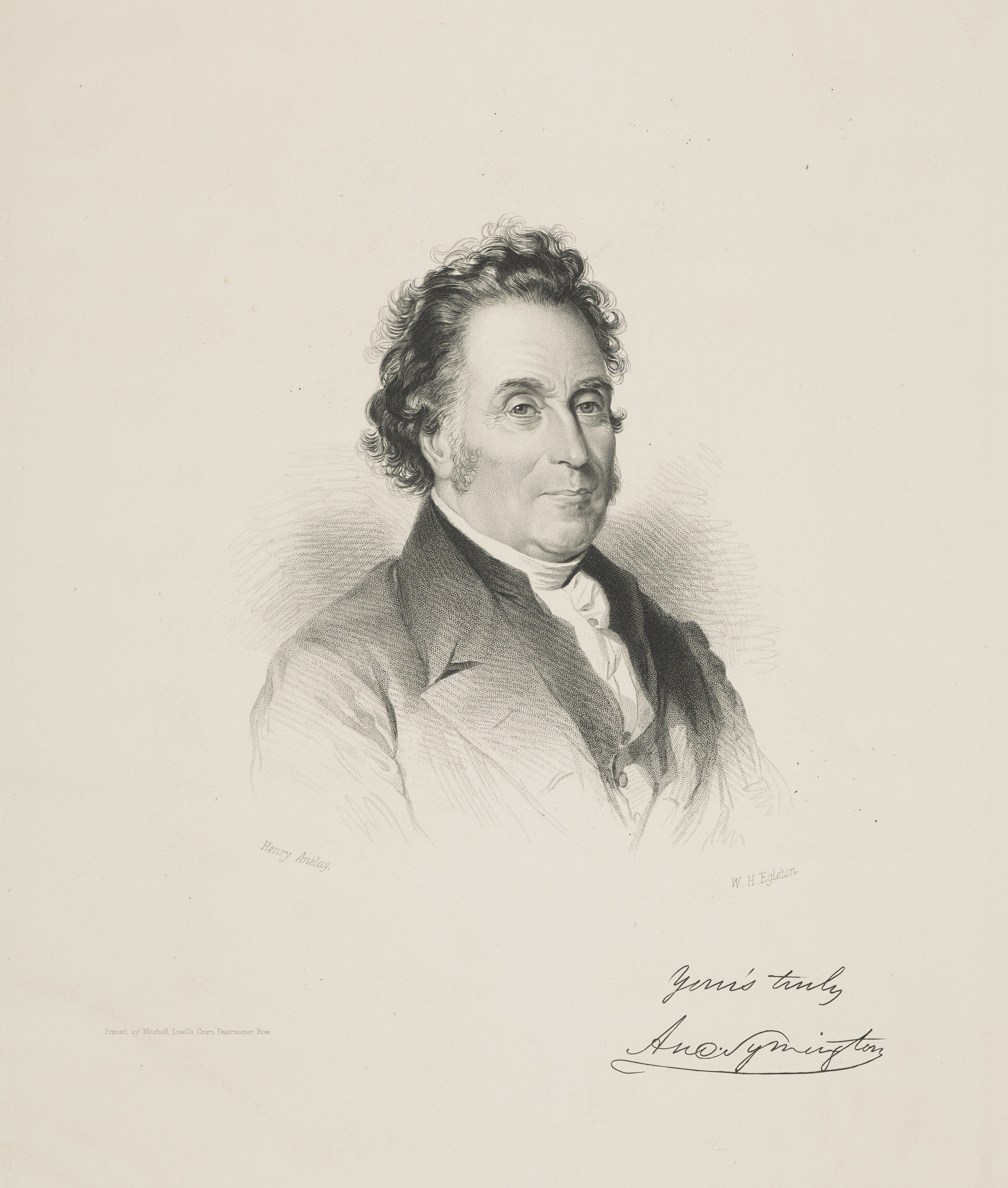
Andrew Symington by William Henry Egleton

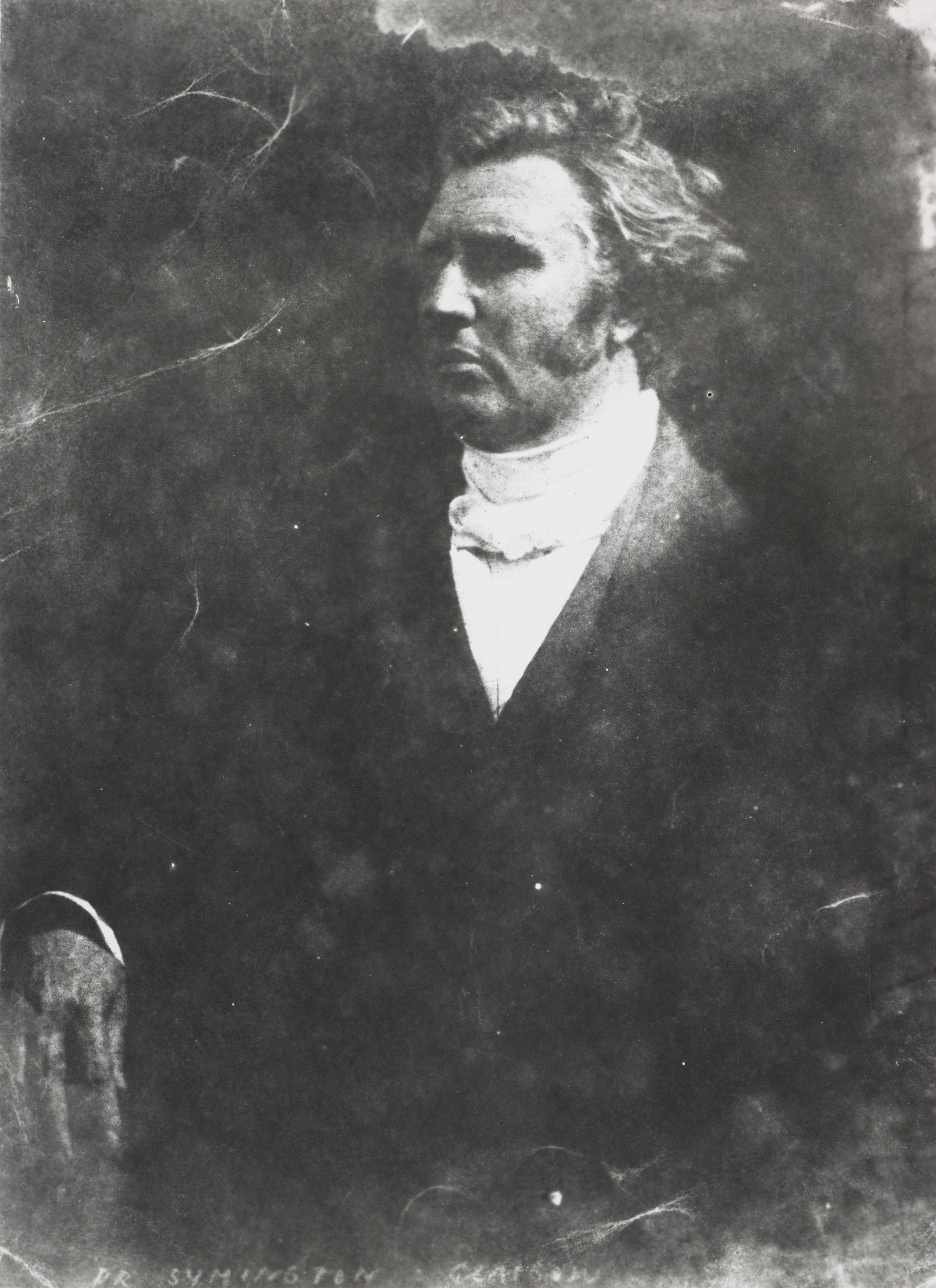
Andrew Symington by Hill & Adamson

Andrew Symington (26 June 1785 – 22 September 1853), was a Scottish minister and teacher. He was ordained in 1809. In 1820 he was appointed professor of theology in the Reformed Presbyterian Church of Scotland.

== Life ==
Andrew Symington was born at Paisley on 26 June 1785, the eldest son of a merchant at the Cross, who gave three members of his family to the ministry. He received his early training at Paisley Grammar School, and then proceeded to the University of Glasgow, where he had taken honours in several departments. In 1803 he graduated M.A. He attended the Hall at Stirling for the sessions 1805–7, and was licensed on November 11, 1807. Three calls were soon after offered to him - Glasgow, Water of Urr, and Paisley. He chose his native place, and was ordained there on April 26, 1809.

He was made a D.D. by the Western University of Pennsylvania in 1831, which Glasgow University followed up with the same honour in 1840. In 1811 he was appointed Clerk to the Synod, a post he held till 1822. On the death of his old teacher, John M'Millan, he was called, in 1820, to be Professor of Theology to the denomination. The method he adopted differed from that of his predecessor, for he abandoned expounding the Confession of Faith, and gave lectures on Systematic Theology. When he died, it is said that only six or seven of the missionaries or ministers of the Church had not passed through his hands, while students came from Ireland and America.

With the exception of a few isolated sermons preached on special occasions and one or two introductory biographies to memorial volumes of sermons, he produced little. His Guide for Private Social Prayer, 1823, reached several editions, and the Elements of Divine Truth was published posthumously in 1854. He prepared some of the public documents of the Church.

He died on 22 September 1853. A slight accident had incapacitated him a fortnight before, but his death was unexpected. He met his students in his own house two days before the end. His successor was George Glazy, who was ordained on 3 October 1854. The Synod of the Church appointed Andrew's brother Dr. William Symington to the vacant Chair of Systematic Theology.

== Family ==
He married Jane Stevenson, of Crookedholm, Riccarton, Ayrshire on 18 December 1811. They had fourteen children, of whom three sons and three daughters survived him -

- Margaret, Marion
- William. (married, died without issue)
- James, died unmarried
- Margaret
- Marion
- Isabella
- Jane
- Robert, electrician in Glasgow, emigrated to Canada (married Margaret D. Orr)
- Andrew, died young (he was minister successively at Laurieston and Greenock)
- Margaret
- Jane Stevenson
- Andrew, R.P.C, Greenock

Symington's father was a merchant and a member of the Reformed Presbyterian Church, and his brother William Symington was a preacher in the same denomination. Another brother, Robert Brown Symington, was the father of Andrew James Symington (born 1825), author of Harebell Chimes and other books of poetry.

== Publications ==
Besides numerous tracts and sermons, Symington wrote:

- ‘The Martyr's Monument,’ Paisley, 1847.
- ‘Elements of Divine Truth,’ Edinburgh, 1854, 8vo.

He also contributed ‘The Unity of the Heavenly Church’ (1845) to ‘Essays on Christian Union,’ wrote memoirs of Archibald Mason and Thomas Halliday, which are prefixed to the collected editions of their discourses, and supplied an article on the Reformed Presbyterian church to the ‘Cyclopædia of Religious Denominations,’ 1853, 8vo.

- The God of Paul's Fathers. A sermon. 1813.
- The Dismission, Rest, and Future Glory of the Good and Faithful Servant. A sermon preached on the death of the Rev. Archibald Mason, D.D. 1832.
- The Blood of Faithful Martyrs precious in the sight of the Lord. A sermon. 1834.
- The Child Jesus. A sermon. 1839.
- Private Social Prayer. A sermon. 1840.
- Death Swallowed up in Victory; a sermon preached on the death of the Rev. William Goold, senior minister of the Reformed Presbyterian Congregation, Edinburgh. Published by request. Third edition. Edinburgh, 1844.
- The Martyr's Monument. A Brief View of the Principles and character of the Scottish Martyrs. Paisley, 1847.
- On Intemperance. A sermon
- Guide to Private Social Prayer
- Essay on the Unity of the Heavenly State.
- Tract on the Sabbath.
- Lecture on the Claims of the Church and Society on Young Men. Glasgow, 1850.
- Memoir of the Rev. Thomas Halliday, Airdrie. Prefixed to his Discourses.
- Elements of Divine Truth. A series of Lectures on Christian Theology to Sabbath School Teachers. 8vo. Edinburgh. 1854. Posthumous.
