= Patrick Goold =

South African politician (1814–1886)

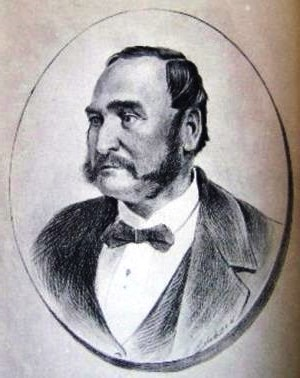
Patrick Goold, from Het Volksblad, September 1883

Patrick Goold MLA (1814–1886) was a prominent member of the Parliament of the Cape of Good Hope.

== Early life ==
Patrick Goold was born in Cork, Ireland, in 1814, the son of Michael Henry and Elizabeth Mahoney Goold. As part of the British Army, he came to the Cape Colony in 1835, where he served on the frontier for the next few decades - working more with logistics than in actual combat.

He became a prominent merchant on the eastern frontier after discharge. He also formed the Veterans Volunteer Force in 1877, of which he became Captain. On 6 August 1849 he married Ellen Cullopy.

== Political career ==
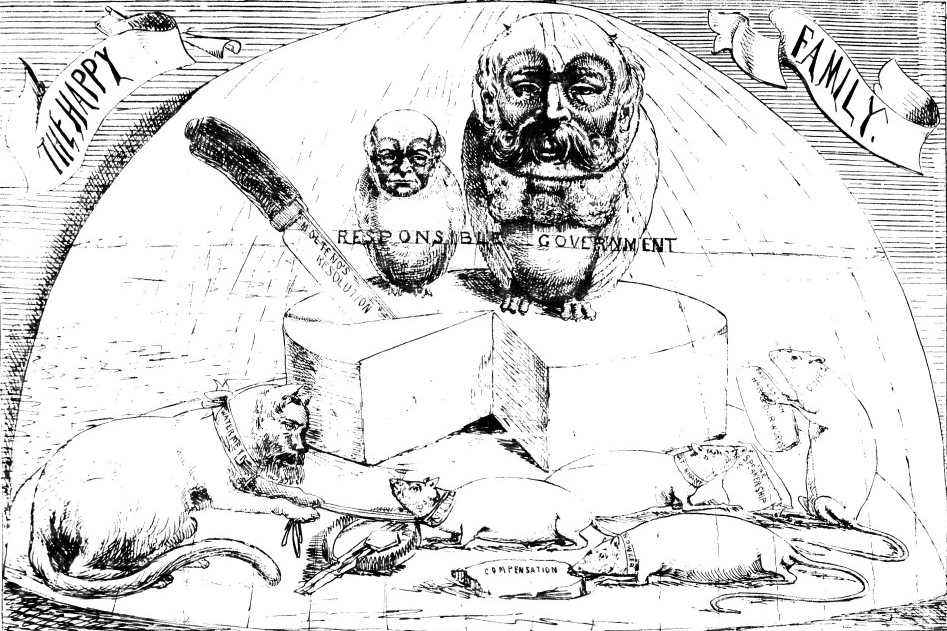
Cartoon critical of responsible government. Goold is shown as the mouse on the far right, holding the cheese labelled "East London Harbour Works"

He settled in the frontier town of King William's Town, and in 1869 he stood with Charles Abercrombie Smith in the hotly contested election for that district. Goold and Smith were elected as Members of the Cape Parliament (House of Assembly). Controversially, Goold was a Catholic, and both he and Smith were relative liberals, elected by a conservative and Protestant district.

In parliament he was strictly independent. However he soon came to be one of a group of Eastern Province MPs who strongly supported the movement for Responsible Government (or "self-rule" as Goold preferred to call it) led by John Molteno, and the allied movement for Voluntaryism (complete separation of Church and State) led by Saul Solomon.

He was noted for hardly ever speaking in the house, but for his slow, hard-hitting and very humorous eloquence when he did speak. He retired soon after Responsible Government and Voluntarism were successfully introduced in 1872.
