= William Henry Goold =

Scottish minister

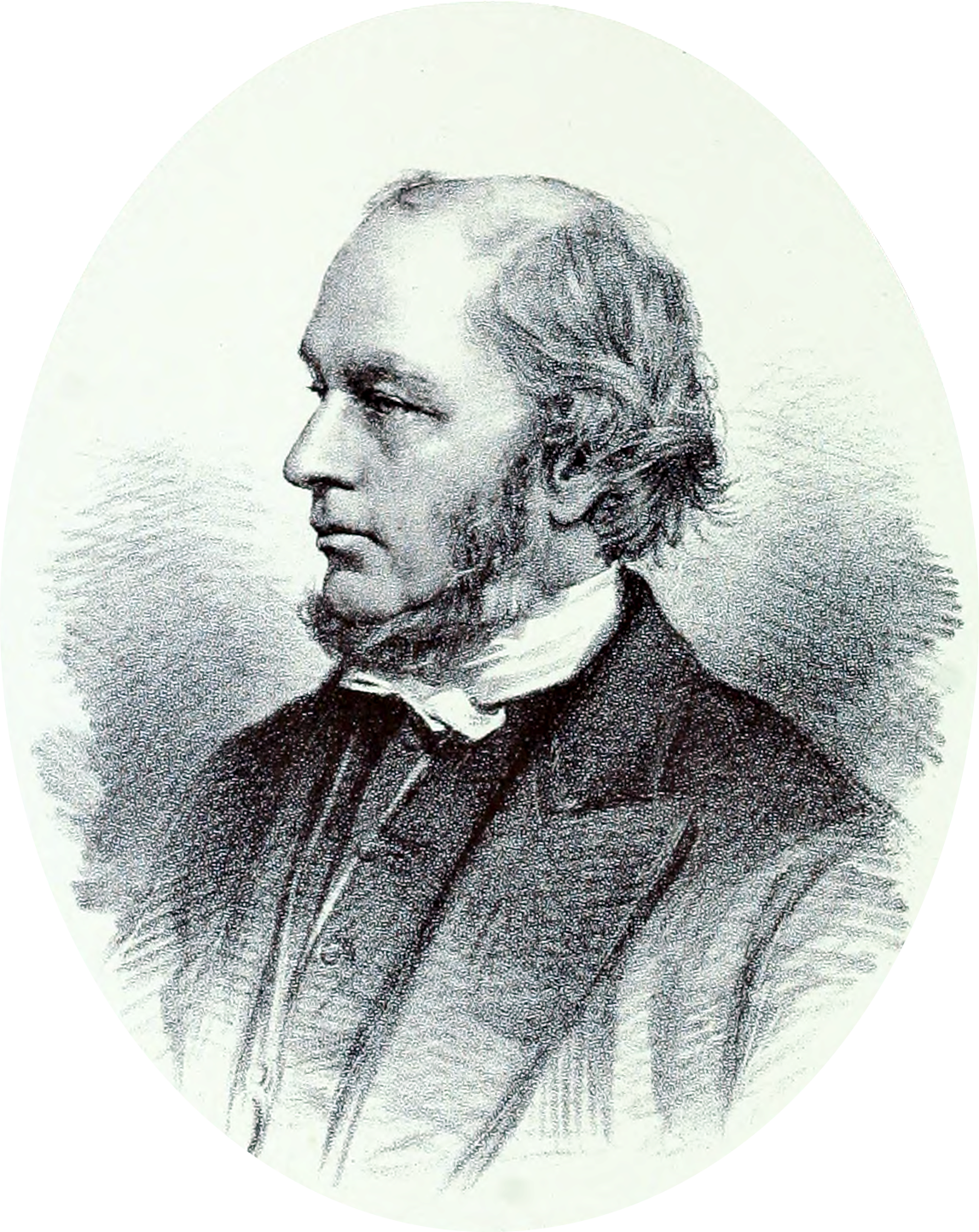
- William Henry Goold from Disruption Worthies

Personal details
- Born: 20 December 1815
- Died: 27 June 1897 (aged 81)

minister of Edinburgh
- In office 6 October 1840 – 1854

Professor of Biblical Criticism and Church History to the Reformed Presbytery Synod
- In office 1854–1876

Eastern Secretary of the National Bible Society of Scotland
- In office 1860 – 27 June 1897

Moderator of Reformed Presbyterian Synod
- In office 1876–1877

Moderator of the Free Church of Scotland
- In office 1877–1878

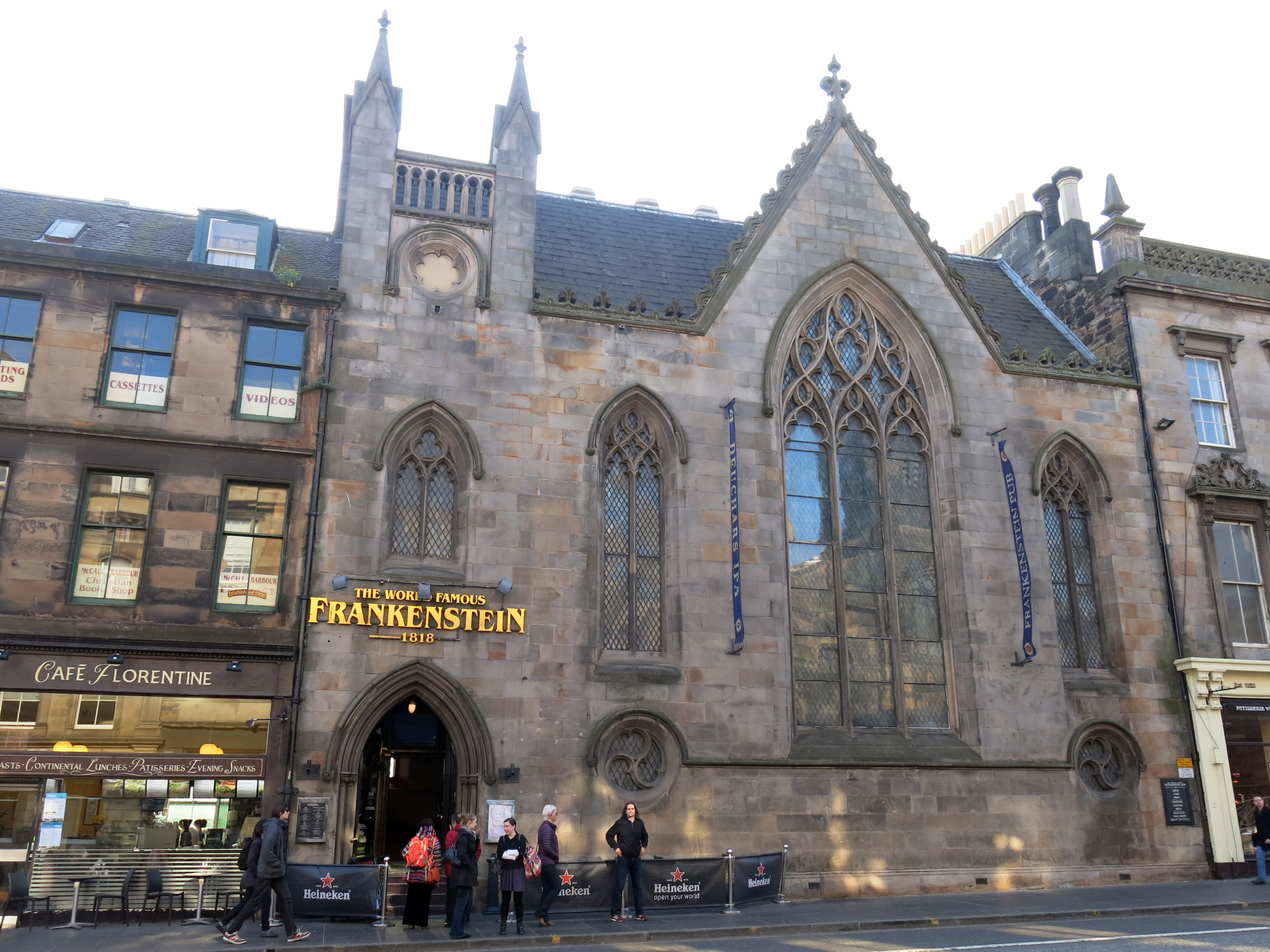
Martyrs Church, George IV Bridge, now the Frankenstein Pub

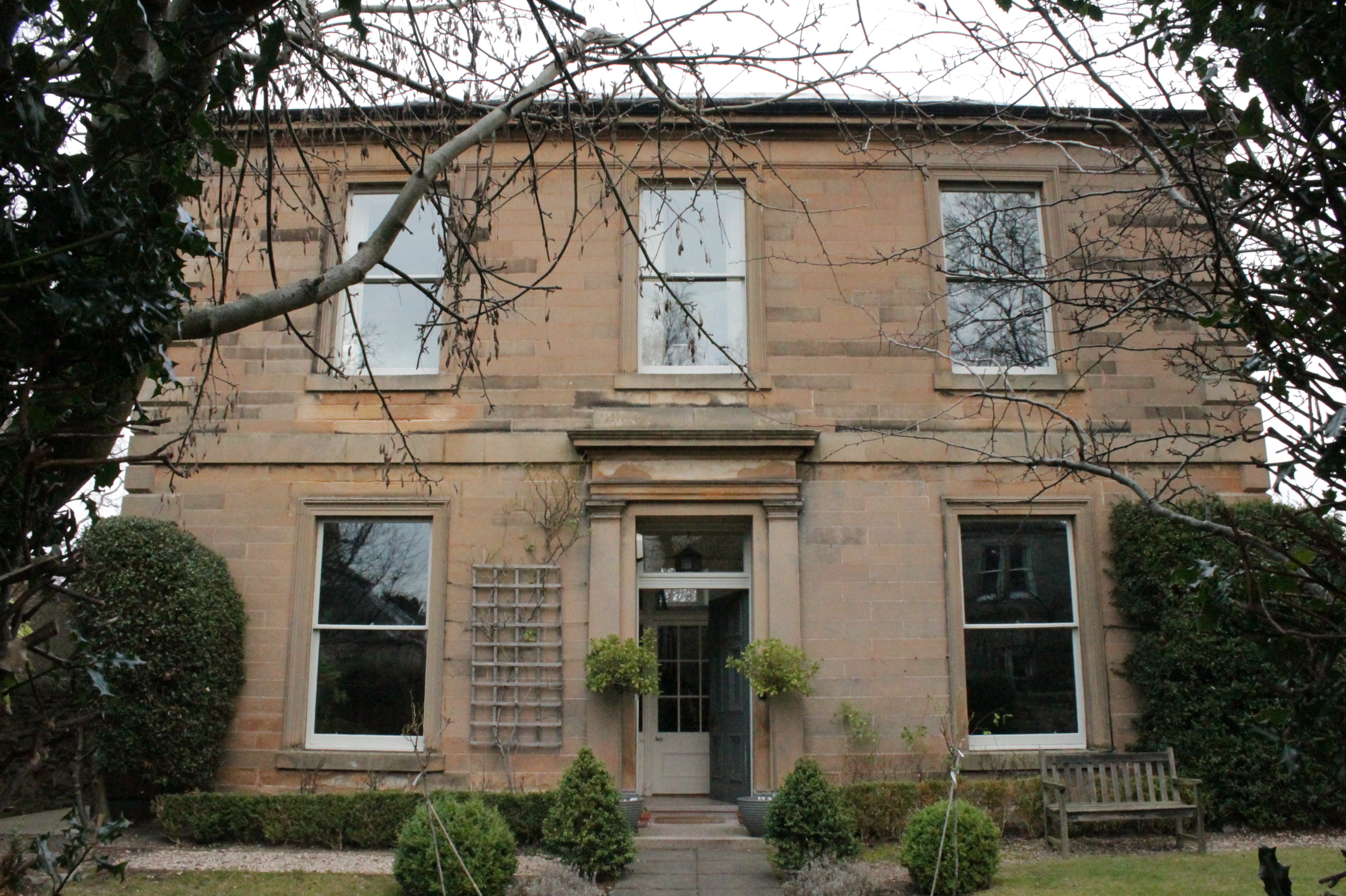
28 Mansionhouse Road, Edinburgh

William Henry Goold (15 December 1815 – 29 June 1897) was a Scottish minister of both the Reformed Presbyterian Church and the Free Church of Scotland. He was the last Moderator of the majority Reformed Presbyterian Church Synod before the union with the Free Church in 1876 when most of the R. P. congregations entered the union. He was also called to be Moderator of General Assembly of the Free Church in the following year: 1877.

== Life ==
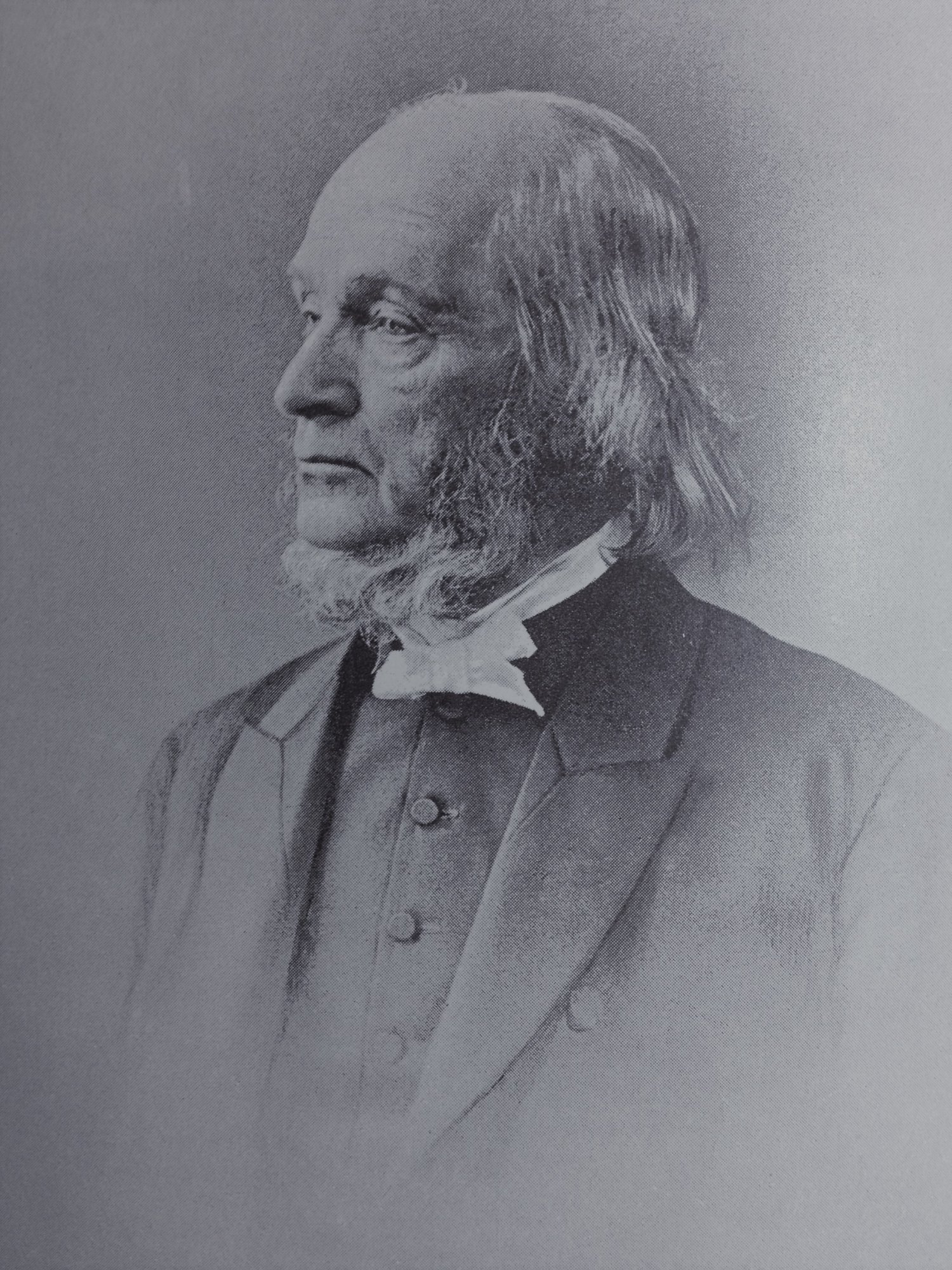
William Henry Goold

He was born on 15 December 1815 at 28 Buccleuch Place the only son of Rev William Goold. His father was a member of the Reformed Presbyterian Church. He was educated at the old High School and in 1829 was one of the pupils in the newly built High School on Calton Hill. He was school dux in his final year of 1831. He took a degree at the University of Edinburgh and then studied divinity at the Theological Hall in Paisley.

He was licensed to preach by the Reformed Church on 14 April 1840 and was subsequently ordained on 6 October as a colleague in his father's church in Edinburgh. The congregation of the Martyrs' Church met on George IV Bridge and Goold relocated to live, initially at Buccleuch Street and then, around 1850, at 28 Buccleuch Place.

In 1854 he was elected successor to Andrew Symington, his mentor and wife's uncle, at the Theological College in Paisley. From 1860 he was Secretary of the National Bible Society of Scotland. In 1876 the Reformed Presbyterian Church merged with the Free Church of Scotland, continuing simply as the Free Church of Scotland. William Goold was central to the conditions of the merge.

Dr Goold took a leading part in the movements for Union. He grieved that the larger projected Union of 1873 failed. What he did for the Union of 1876 was recognised by his being chosen the last Moderator of his own Church, and the Moderator of the General Assembly of the Free Church in 1877. He succeeded Thomas McLauchlan as Moderator of the General Assembly; he was the first from a Cameronian background to serve in this role. He was succeeded in 1878 by Andrew Bonar.

In 1890 there was a celebration of his jubilee in the Martyrs Church.

He died at home 28 Mansionhouse Road in the Grange, Edinburgh on 29 June 1897 aged 81. He requested that Psalm 103 was read to him before he died.

The Martyrs Church transferred to the Free Church of Scotland in the Union of 1876. In the 20th century it became the Elim Pentecostal Church for Edinburgh. It is now in secular use as a public house.

== Family ==
In 1846 he married Margaret Speirs Symington (d.1875) daughter of Rev William Symington of the Reformed Presbyterian Church in Stranraer. They had two daughters and four sons, one son died three weeks before his wife and another a few weeks after.

His sister Janet Helen Goold married George Smeaton.

He married 1846, Margaret Spiers (born 5 August 1822, died 25 October 1876) daughter of William Symington, R.P.C. Glasgow, and had issue -

- Agnes Spiers, born 2 June 1847 died 6 October 1847
- Isabella Burrell, born 3 June 1848, died unmarried, 22 January 1923
- William Symington, born 19 December 1849, died 14 June 1863
- Andrew Symington, born 10 December 1852, died 30 December 1917
- George Smeaton, born 30 May 1854, died 17 January 1940
- Alexander Macleod Symington, born 22 May 1856, died 11 September 1875
- Henry Burrell, born 8 June 1862, died 25 November 1875
- Litellus Burrell, b. 8 Jun. 1862, died 8 August 1894
- Margaret Spiers Symington, born 11 April 1860, died unmarried 19 November 1914

== Publications ==
- Claims of the Church of Christ
- The Church: Its Privileges and Duties
- The Consummation of Christ's Works
- Patronage opposed to the Independence of the Church (Edinburgh 1841)
- Popery and Puseyism (Glasgow 1847)
- The Maynooth Endowment, a sin and a blunder (Edinburgh 1852)
- On the Supernatural in Christianity (Edinburgh 1865)
- Claims of the Church of Christ
- Work of Christ's Church in Modern Times, etc.
- He edited the Edinburgh edition of the Works of John Owen.
