= Airds Moss =

Moor area in East Ayrshire, Scotland

Coordinates: 55.48969°N 4.21733°W

Airds Moss is a large area of moor in East Ayrshire, the site is a protected area because of the extensive blanket bogs. In 1680 it was the location of a clash between troops loyal to King Charles II and the covenanters under Richard Cameron in which Cameron was killed.

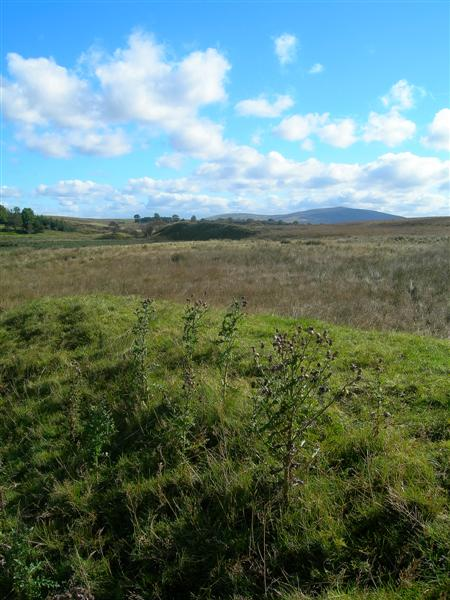
The Edge of Airds Moss

== General description ==
Airds Moss lies between the towns of Cumnock and Muirkirk and situated between the rivers Ayr and Lugar. Aird Moss is twenty-five kilometres (16 miles) long and eight kilometres (5.0 miles) wide and it is the largest area of blanket bog in the southern part of the old Strathclyde Region which has not been subjected to afforestation.

== History ==
Airds Moss is known in the history of Scotland as the site of the Battle of Airds Moss. This took place on the 22 July 1680 when a party of 112 government troops commanded by Andrew Bruce of Earlshall loyal to King Charles II came across a group of covenanters on the road between Cumnock and Muirkirk. The covenanters were the smaller company and their leader was Richard Cameron. A brief battle occurred in which 9 covenanters were killed, 5 were captured and the rest escaped. Cameron was one of those killed, as was his brother Michael. 28 of the government troops were killed. The prisoners were taken to Edinburgh where they were later hanged. The battle is commemorated by a memorial in the shape of a squat obelisk with an inscription which was erected by the Scottish Covenanters Memorial Association. The famous Scottish infantry regiment, The Cameronians, took their name in honour of Richard Cameron.

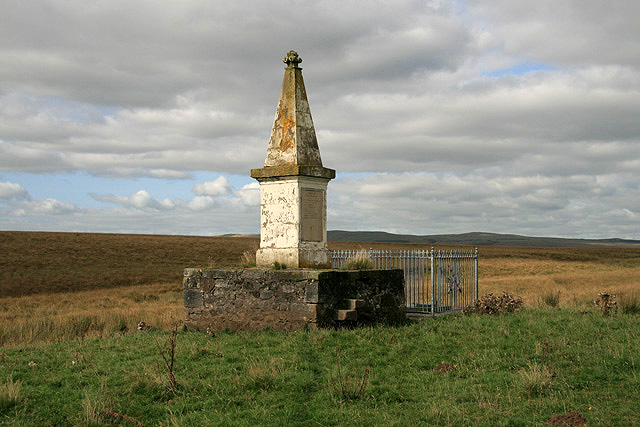
Monument and martyr's grave on Airds Moss

Airds Moss was the location of the Tarrioch Ironworks, the only 18th century charcoal-fired blast furnace in southern Scotland. The Tarrioch Ironworks were constructed in the early 1730s by the Earl of Cathcart to take advantage of locally available materials, wood from the river valleys was used to make charcoal, water was diverted from the river to power a waterwheel which powered the furnace bellows and the local quarries produced hematite iron ore. The ironworks were in operation for around 20 years.

== Conservation Interest ==
Airds Moss is one of the few areas of comparatively low-altitude blanket bog left in south-western Scotland, elsewherein this region conversion to agricultural use and afforestation have reduced the original extent of blanket bog. In some parts of Airds Moss the vegetation has been altered by historical drainage and quarrying for hematite and these areas are dominated by purple moor-grass (Molinia caerulea). Other parts of the site, where there is surface patterning and extensive area of more typical bog vegetation are dominated by heather (Calluna vulgaris), deergrass (Trichophorum cespitosum) and cross-leaved heath (Erica tetralix) while white beak-sedge (Rhynchospora alba), cranberry (Vaccinium oxycoccos) and carpets of the moss Sphagnum magellanicum can be locally abundant. The SAC has an area of around one thousand three hundred hectares (3,200 acres), of which roughly nine hundred hectares (2,200 acres) consists of a mosaic of mire vegetation communities.

The area qualifies as a Special Protection Area because it contains breeding and wintering hen harrier, merlin, peregrine falcon, short-eared owl and European golden plover. Slightly more than four hundred hectares (990 acres) of the Moss is managed as a wildlife reserve by the Royal Society for the Protection of Birds with the aim of improving the condition of the site and the neighbouring floodplain to benefit wildlife. This has included blocking drainage ditches and thousands of dams have been installed to restore water levels.
