= John Goold (physicist) =

Irish theoretical physicist

- Born: Ireland
- Education: University College Cork
- Known for: Quantum thermodynamics, Quantum information theory
- Scientific career
- Fields: Theoretical physics, Quantum thermodynamics, Quantum information
- Workplaces: Trinity College Dublin
- Doctoral advisor: Thomas Busch

John Goold is an Irish theoretical physicist and Professor in Physics at Trinity College Dublin. He has worked on quantum thermodynamics, quantum information, and many-body physics. Goold leads the Quantum Systems Unit (QuSys) at Trinity, one of Ireland's largest theoretical physics research groups. He also is a member of the team of the quantum software startup Algorithmiq, has collaborations with both IBM and Microsoft and directs the Trinity Quantum Alliance.

== Education ==
Goold studied physics at University College Cork (UCC), where he obtained a Bachelor of Science (BSc) degree in 2006. He remained at UCC for his doctoral studies, completing a PhD in physics in 2010, supervised by Professor Thomas Busch. His doctoral research focused on one-dimensional quantum gases and the emergence of entanglement and coherence.

== Career ==
Following his PhD, Goold held a research fellowship at the Centre for Quantum Technologies, National University of Singapore, in 2010. He then moved to the University of Oxford with an INSPIRE Marie Curie Fellowship at the Clarendon Laboratory, where he worked from 2010 to 2013. From 2013 to 2017, he was a Research Scientist at the Condensed Matter and Statistical Physics division of the Abdus Salam International Centre for Theoretical Physics (ICTP) in Trieste, Italy.

In 2017, Goold joined the School of Physics at Trinity College Dublin as an assistant professor. He was promoted to associate professor in 2019 and to full professor in 2024. He was elected as a fellow in Trinity in 2022. In 2023, Goold founded the Trinity Quantum Alliance, a national centre for academic–industry collaboration in quantum science with founding partners including IBM, Microsoft, Algorithmiq, and Horizon Quantum.

Goold founded and previously directed the MSc program in Quantum Science and Technology at Trinity College Dublin, Ireland's first quantum master's program. Goold also played a major role in establishing the TCD–Microsoft scholarship for women in quantum science and the Trinity AQ fellowships supporting underrepresented students from the Global South.

== Research ==
Goold has co-authored a review on the intersection of thermodynamics and quantum information theory, which has been cited over 1,000 times. His research has introduced new theoretical frameworks for quantum batteries, non-equilibrium quantum engines, and the quantum Landauer principle.

He has been involved in extractions of quantum work statistics from experimental data and the development of quantum engines using a single trapped ion.

His group's collaboration with IBM led to a simulation demonstrating Kardar-Parisi-Zhang (KPZ) scaling on a quantum processor in 2023 and he has been part of the team alongside IBM and Algorithmiq to simulate the decay of the light cone of autocorrelation functions on dual unitary circuits.

Alongside his interest in quantum thermodynamics, his recent work focuses on geometrical transitions between nonequilibrium steady states and on developing general information-geometric frameworks for quantum thermodynamics. He is also developing theoretical approaches to understand the Mpemba effect in both classical and quantum regimes.

== Honours and awards ==
Goold is the recipient of a European Research Council (ERC) Starting Grant and an ERC Proof of Concept Grant. He has also been awarded a Royal Society–Science Foundation Ireland University Research Fellowship and an SFI Frontiers for the Future Grant. In 2022, he was elected as a Fellow in Trinity. He was awarded the AMBER Industry Engagement Award, alongside Stefano Sanvito in 2023.
