= Reformed Presbyterian Church of Scotland =

Scottish reformed church

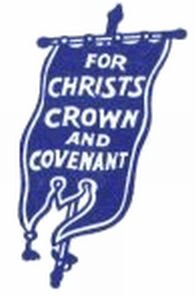
- Classification: Protestant
- Orientation: Reformed Presbyterian
- Polity: Presbyterian
- Origin: 1690
- Separated from: reconstituted Church of Scotland
- Separations: 1876 Majority joined Free Church of Scotland
- Congregations: 5
- Members: 250
- Official website: www.rpcscotland.org

The Reformed Presbyterian Church of Scotland is a small Presbyterian church denomination in Scotland. Theologically, they are similar to many other Presbyterian denominations in that their office-bearers subscribe to the Westminster Confession of Faith. In practice, they are more theologically conservative than most Scottish Presbyterians and maintain a very traditional form of worship.

The Reformed Presbyterians coalesced in the 1740s, but the context in which they developed was heavily influenced by the religious and political changes of the prior century, and in particular the English Civil War. In 1643, during the War, English Parliamentarians entered an agreement with Scottish Presbyterian Covenanters, known as the Solemn League and Covenant. In exchange for Scottish support, the document declared that Presbyterianism would become the national religion of Britian, with Jesus being recognised as king over both church and state. That year, the Long Parliament called the Westminster Assembly, which over ten years would reform the English church along Presbyterian lines in accordance with the terms of the Solemn League and Covenant. After the Stuart Restoration in 1660, however, the new King, Charles II, and his government passed the Clarendon Code, re-established the Church of England, and repudiated the Solemn League and Covenant. British subjects who refused to disown the Covenant and to conform to the established church were known as dissenters.

For several years, dissenters who adhered to the Covenant formed their own churches (United Societies). From these roots the Reformed Presbyterian Church of Scotland was formed. It grew until there were congregations in several countries.

The Reformed Presbytery was officially constituted in summer 1743 at Braehead, Carnwath.

In 1876 the majority of Reformed Presbyterians, or RPs, joined the Free Church of Scotland, and thus the present-day church, which remained outside this union, is a continuing church. There are currently Scottish RP congregations in Airdrie, Stranraer, Stornoway, Glasgow, and North Edinburgh. Internationally they form part of the Reformed Presbyterian Global Alliance.

== History ==
=== Overview ===
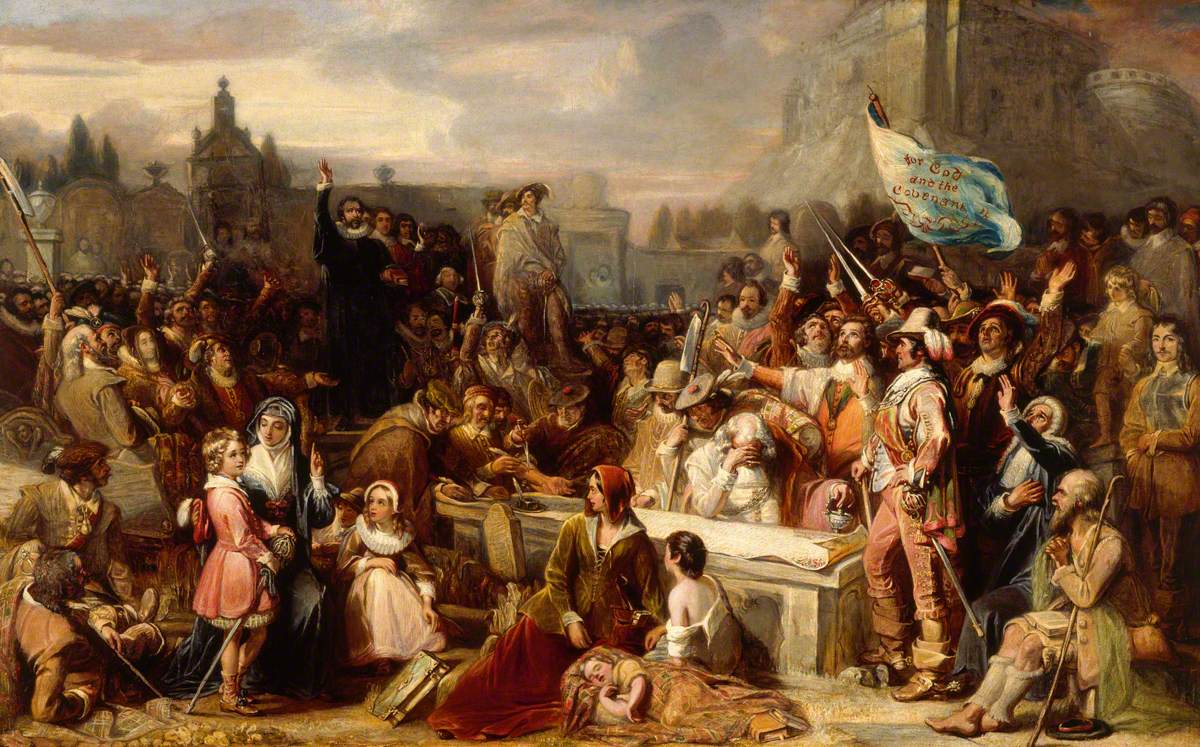
The Signing of the National Covenant in Greyfriars Kirkyard, Edinburgh

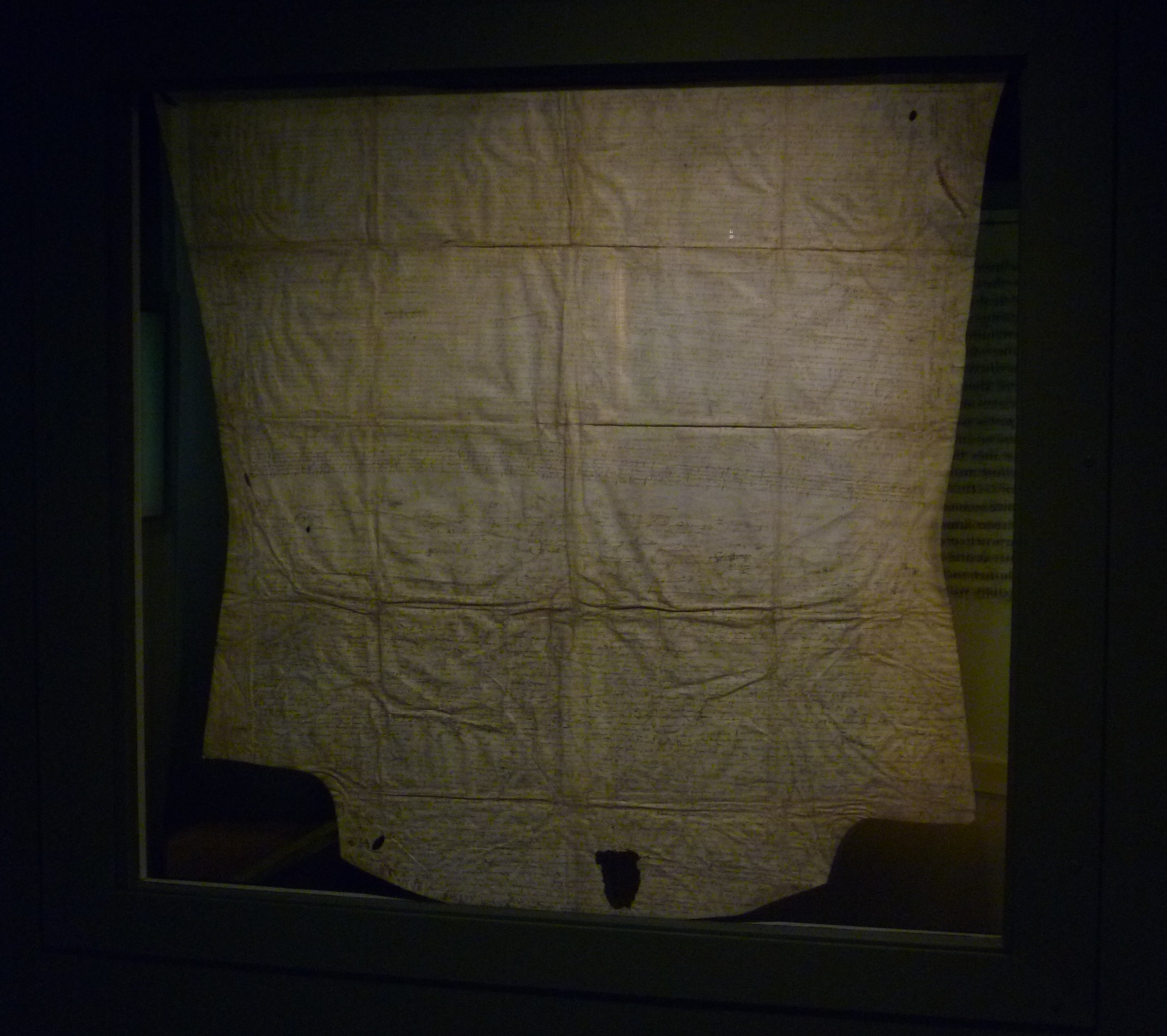
The National Covenant of 1638 in Edinburgh's Huntly House Museum. Believed to be the original from which copies were made.

In 1871, the Chambers's Encyclopaedia described the Cameronians as being official designated as Reformed Presbyterians. It might briefly be defined as consisting of a small party of Presbyterians, who objected to the Revolution settlement in church and state, and desired to see in full force that kind of civil and ecclesiastical polity that prevailed in Scotland from 1638 to 1649. According to the Solemn League and Covenant, ratified by the parliaments of England and Scotland, and also by the Assembly of Divines at Westminster in 1643, Presbyterianism was to be maintained in the kingdoms of England, Scotland, and Ireland, and popery, prelacy, superstition, heresies, schism, &c., were to be rooted out. The Covenanters in Scotland contended for this throughout the reigns of Charles II and James VII. Many of the Covenanters repudiated the government of William III and his successors, and still maintained the perpetually binding obligations of the Covenants (for the historic view of other Scottish Presbyterians see Fentiman). These Cameronians (named after one of their earliest preachers, Richard Cameron) acted under strong convictions, and it is in the standards of this sect that we have to look for a true embodiment of the tenets held by the great body of English and Scotch Presbyterians of 1643. Others submitted to the Revolution settlement, and afterwards found cause to secede. The Cameronians never gave in.

Although thus, in point of fact, an elder sister of the existing Church of Scotland and all its Secessions, the Cameronian body did not assume a regular form till after the Revolution; and it was with some difficulty that it organised a communion with ordained ministers. Several of their ministers returned to the Church of Scotland and for 16 years the group had no preachers at all; finally in 1706 they were joined by the Rev. John M'Millan, from the Established Church.

In a short time afterwards, the communion was joined by Mr. John M'Neil, a licentiate of the Established Church. As a means of confirming the faith of members of the body, and of giving a public testimony of their principles, it was resolved to renew the Covenants; and this solemnity took place at Auchensach, near Douglas, in Lanarkshire, in 1712. The subsequent accession of the Rev. Mr. Nairne, enabled the Cameronians to constitute a presbytery at Braehead, in the parish of Carnwath, on 1 August 1743, under the new name of the Reformed Presbytery. Other preachers afterwards attached themselves to the group, which continued to flourish obscurely in the west of Scotland and north of Ireland. For their history and tenets, we refer to the Testimony of the Reformed Presbyterian Church.

The 1871 Chambers Encyclopedia noted that the political position of the Cameronian was very peculiar, as they refused to recognise any laws or institutions which they conceived to be inimical to those of the kingdom of Christ; from which cause they greatly isolated themselves from general society, and refused several of the responsibilities and privileges of citizens. Chambers saw them as zealous and uncompromising, but also a peaceful body of Christians, who, under the shelter of a free and tolerant government, were left unmolested to renew the Covenants as often as they wished. In 1860, the body numbered six presbyteries, comprising 45 congregations in Scotland, including one in Edinburgh and four in Glasgow. There were also congregations in Ireland and North America connected with the group.

=== Background ===
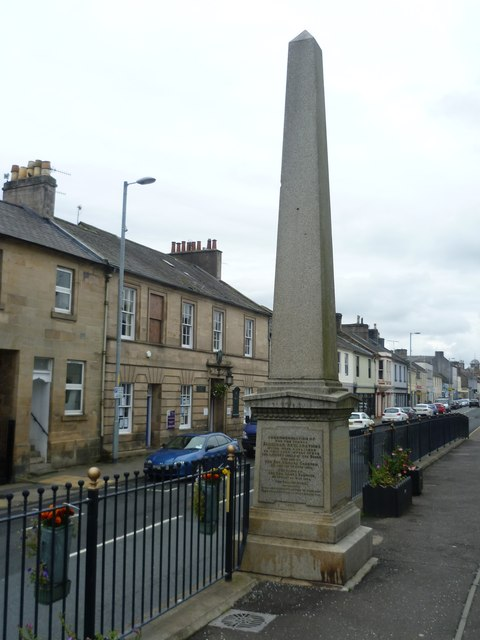
Sanquhar Declarations Monument

Reformed Presbyterians have been referred to historically as Covenanters because of their identification with public covenanting in Scotland, beginning in the 16th century. In response to the king's attempts to change the style of worship and form of government in the churches that had previously been agreed upon (covenanted) by the free assemblies and parliament, a number of ministers affirmed their adherence to those previous agreements. They became signatories to the "National Covenant" of February 1638 at Greyfriars Kirk, in Edinburgh. It is from this that the Blue Banner comes, proclaiming "For Christ's Crown And Covenant", as the Covenanters saw the king's attempt to alter the church as an attempt to claim its headship from Jesus Christ. In August, 1643, the Covenanters signed a political treaty with the English Parliamentarians, called the "Solemn League and Covenant". Under this covenant the signatories agreed to establish Presbyterianism as the national church in England and Ireland. In exchange, the "Covenanters" agreed to support the English Parliamentarians against Charles I of England in the English Civil War. The Solemn League and Covenant asserted the privileges of the "crown rights" of Jesus as king over both Church and state, and the Church's right to freedom from coercive state interference. Oliver Cromwell put the independents in power in England, signalling the end of the reforms promised by the Parliament.

The Presbyterians believed in the Divine Right of Presbytery. To this way of thinking the Presbyterian form of church government was not something granted by a king or civil government; it was a divine right. That is not to say that the church could over-rule the civil authorities in all things as in the Roman Catholic system; nor would they accept that the king had absolute powers conferred on him by God, despite what the Stuart kings asserted. Rather the civil authorities and the church authorities each have their proper place - independently of each other. They had separate Magisteria. It is the doctrine of separation of Church and State as taught by John Calvin.

When the monarchy was restored in 1660, some Presbyterians were hopeful in the new covenanted king, as Charles II had sworn to the covenants in Scotland in 1650 and 1651. Charles II, however, determined that he would have none of this talk of covenants. While the majority of the population participated in the established church, the Covenanters dissented strongly; instead holding illegal worship services called conventicles in the countryside. They suffered greatly in the persecutions that followed, administered against them during the reigns of Charles II and James VII. Indeed the worst days of the period became known as the Killing Times. Meanwhile, when persecution broke out after Charles II had declared the Scottish Covenants illegal, tens of thousands of Scottish Covenanters had fled to Ulster, between 1660 and 1690. These Covenanters eventually formed the Reformed Presbyterian Church of Ireland.

The earlier martyrs in dying had protested that they not only feared God, but honoured the King; but in 1680, first in the Queensferry Paper, which was drawn up, it is supposed, by Donald Cargill, and afterwards in the Sanquhar Declaration, which was affixed to the Burgh Cross of that village by Richard Cameron, the authority of Charles II. was disowned, and war was declared against him as a tyrant and a usurper. The proclamation was an act of rebellion, but it will be remembered it was based on the same ground precisely as that which was taken up by William when he ascended the throne.

=== Split from Shields and the reconstituted Church of Scotland ===
In 1690, Presbyterianism was restored to the established Church in Scotland. Because there was no acknowledgement of the sovereignty of Christ in terms of the Solemn League and Covenant, however, a party of dissenters refused to enter into this national arrangement, the Revolution Settlement, on the grounds that it was forced upon the Church and did not adhere to the nation's previous covenanted settlement. These formed into societies which eventually formed the Reformed Presbyterian Church in Scotland.

In 1690, after the Revolution, Alexander Shields joined the Church of Scotland, and was received into communion, 25 October 1690, with his associates, Thomas Linning and William Boyd. These 3 had previously ministered to a group of dissenters of the United Societies when conventicles were outlawed. Unlike these ministers, some Presbyterians did not rejoin the establishment of the Church of Scotland. This left the "United Societies" without any minister for sixteen years. For those sixteen years the Dissenting Covenanters maintained their Societies for worship and religious correspondence. The Societies numbered about twenty, with a general membership of about seven thousand. Shields made his case for unity, and against schism, in the book An Enquiry into Church-Communion.

The idea of a Covenanted nation under a Presbyterian Covenanted king had taken firm possession of their minds of the Dissenters, and it produced a revulsion of feeling when, at the Revolution, no effort was made to bring back the vanished glory and re-instate the Covenant in its former supremacy. Instead of this, they found the newly constituted order was flagrantly at variance with the former and better, they could not acknowledge and submit to the one without rejecting the other; and so they resolved to maintain the same attitude toward the government of William as they had held toward that of the two preceding rulers. They would not own him as king, nor recognise his courts, nor pay the taxes imposed.

That men holding such views should keep aloof from the Revolution Church was to have been expected. The King took far too much to do with its organisation to allow of their adhering to it. Hence, when Presbyterianism was re-established, there remained outside a body of professing Christians who never seceded from this later Church of Scotland, because they never became members of it.

=== First ministers and synod ===
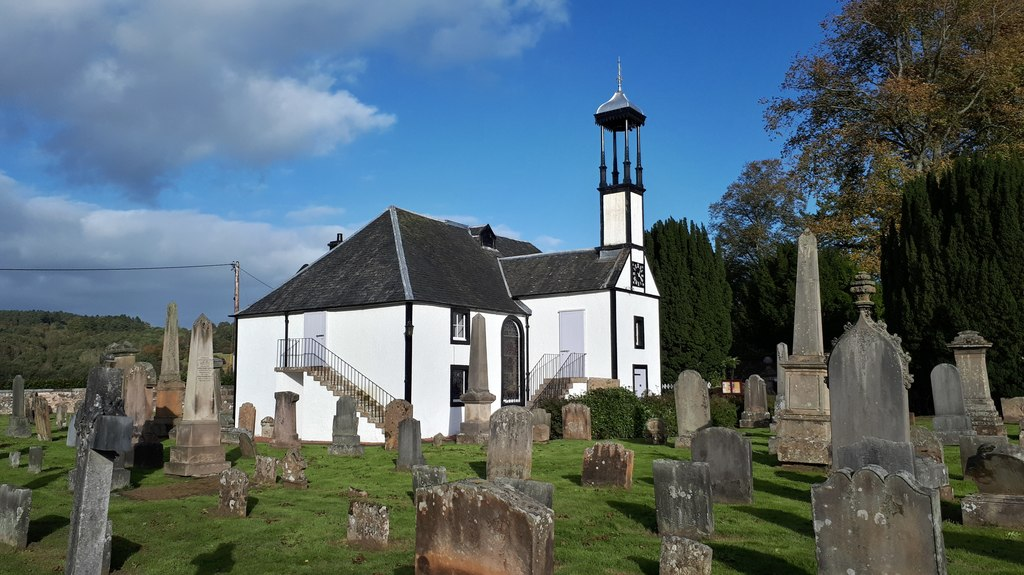
Dalserf Parish Church. Where John M'Millan is buried and has a monument

At the end of the sixteen years, in 1706, Rev. John M'Millan, minister of the parish of Balmaghie, who had tried to persuade his fellow presbyters and churchmen to return to the Covenant ground that they had abandoned, and who had suffered deposition for his persistency, was offered, and accepted, the office of minister to the Dissenting Societies.

The early history of this communion indicates that for many years it had no ministry. Yet it endured on the back of local "Societies" and a "General Meeting." By and by an Established Church minister - Mr. M'Millan of Balmaghie - joined them; but for more than a generation he was left to superintend the work alone.

Thomas Boston was very critical of what he called "the two preachers of the separation", being MacMillan and MacNeill. He preached a sermon in Ettrick on the subject of The Evil and Danger of Schism on 12 December 1708 which was aimed at what he saw to be their errors. Vogan gives a summary of the doctrines in the sermon. Mr. Macneill was licensed by the Presbytery of Penpont, 10 May 1669. He was in the fullest sympathy with Macmillan, and joined him in his "Protestation, Declinature, and Appeal," tabled before the Assembly 1708. The United Societies consistently refused to ordain him, no Presbytery having been constituted, and when he died, 10 December 1732, he had been a probationer for sixty-three years. MacMillan and the United Societies could not ordain their own ministers because in their own eyes they lacked the authority; they did not claim to be a separate church.

MacPherson says of Boston's sermon: "I am not sure but it is one which Renwick, had he survived so long, would have been quite prepared to preach. There was certainly an excuse, perhaps also a justification for Renwick's position which the later Cameronians could not plead for theirs."

MacPherson also discusses one of Hutchison's footnotes about the book Informatory Vindication which was written by Renwick and Shields before the Revolution. "In the course of his analysis of the Informatory Vindication, the Rev. Mr. Hutchison refers to the charge brought against its compilers of being schismatics, a charge, he says, they were well able to repel. They, he goes on to remark, still regarded themselves as a part of the historic Church of Scotland, and were wont to speak of it as the poor, torn, and bleeding mother . . . . They claim that they have not left the church . . . . The declining and corrupt part has left them; they are separating only as refusing to follow in this evil course . . . . They did not claim to be a church, but only fellowship societies of private Christians meeting together for mutual edification and strengthening, and having no idea of forming a separate church."

An attempt made to induce Ebenezer Erskine to join with the United Societies when he seceded from the Established Church in 1733 was not successful. On 1 August 1743, another minister, the Rev. Thomas Nairne, who had left the established Church of Scotland and joined the Associate Presbytery, came over to the Societies, which were then constituted as the Reformed Presbytery. Mr. Nairn came from Abbotshall in Fife who had been a Secession minister. The Presbytery was constituted at Braehead, Carnwath, and ordained new ministers, one of whom, John Cuthbertson, was despatched to support the cause in Pennsylvania. Alexander Marshall who had already studied theology was also ordained and subsequently called.

There was a breach in the Reformed Presbytery in 1753 following the publication of the book A Treatise on Justifying Faith by James Fraser of Brea, who had written it while a prisoner on the Bass Rock, and who had died in 1699. The Amyraldian view of the atonement was commended by a number of ministers who for a while continued as groups of worshipers. Some set up their own dissentient Presbytery which eventually declined out of existence; others morphed, over many years, and became, in 1813, The Unitarian Church of Edinburgh. The Reformed Presbytery had put out a publication teaching against Unitarianism in 1793 called A Testimony and Warning against Socinian and Unitarian errors. It was an official publication addressed to "Christians of every denomination" and was written by Archibald Mason, the first minister of the RP church in Wishaw. Mason later received an honorary D.D. from the college of Schenectady.

Losing two out of the five ministers made things difficult but did not prove fatal for the denomination. There were other splits or divisions in 1822, 1859, 1863 and 1876 despite some press articles claiming there have been none.

On 1 March 1763, an agreement was reached and the Church was divided into a Northern and a Southern congregation. The church increased in numbers, and in 1810 the Presbytery was divided into three - the Eastern, Northern, and Southern Presbyteries - which met the following year as the first Synod of the Reformed Presbyterian Church of Scotland. In that same year, the Irish and North American Reformed Presbyterian churches, daughters of the Scottish church, were also strong enough for each to constitute its first Synod.

The denomination's early views complexioned its whole after-position, and up till 1863 it was regarded in it as an excommunicable offence to take the oath of allegiance or to vote in an election. In that year, however, more liberal principles prevailed, and by a majority of four to one the Synod agreed to enact that "while recommending the members of the Church to abstain from the use of the franchise and from taking the oath of allegiance, discipline to the effect of suspension and expulsion from the Church shall cease."

=== The disruption of 1863 ===
In 1863 the church had a constituency of over 10,000 people. In accordance with its views of an un-covenanted Mornarchy it was, by the formal Act of Testimony, forbidden to the members to take the oath of allegiance or to exercise the franchise in elections for Parliament, because the persons so elected had themselves to take that oath. This prohibition had by the mid-19th century been frequently disregarded, though while some kirk-sessions had at times suspended or cut off offenders, the presbytery or synod had never upon appeal confirmed the sentence; but upon the rise of the Volunteer movement in 1860 the question of the oath assumed fresh prominence. Some sessions attempted to prevent their kirk members from becoming volunteers; the case was thereupon referred to the synod in 1862, which, in 1863 enacted by a large majority, in accordance with previous practice, that, "while recommending the members of the Church to abstain from the use of the franchise and from taking the oath of allegiance, discipline to the effect of suspension and expulsion from the Church shall cease." Three ministers and eight elders, however, immediately protested against this formal abandonment, as they regarded it, of fundamental principles, withdrew from the synod, and formed another body under the same name, which afterwards somewhat increased in numbers. There were therefore by 1874 two distinct bodies in Scotland bearing the same name of "Reformed Presbyterians". The larger body (known as the "Majority Synod") numbered forty-five congregations and maintained six missionaries in the New Hebrides; the smaller (known as the "Minority Synod" being the secession of 1863) had eleven congregations. At the census in 1851 the united body had thirty-nine places of worship. Branches of the Reformed Presbytery were found in Ireland and in the United States, and in both of these branches divisions took place earlier than in Scotland, on the same general grounds of modification of administrative rules and the application of fundamental principles to the varying circumstances of the times. Consequently the two Scottish bodies found themselves supported alike in their later controversy by distinct Irish and American synods. The larger body in Ireland had about thirty-three congregations, with a branch presbytery in New Brunswick and Nova Scotia, and the smaller had seven congregations.

Subsequently the Majority Synod of around 10,000 were largely absorbed in the 1876 union with the Free Church of over 300,000 whereas today's RP church is the continuing church of the Minority Synod.

=== The union of 1876 ===
Timeline showing the evolution of the churches of Scotland from 1560

In the May of 1864, an invitation came to the Majority Synod from the Joint Union Committee of the Free and United Presbyterian Churches, inviting it to take part in the negotiations which were then proceeding. This invitation was cordially accepted, A delegation, with Dr. Goold at its head, was appointed to confer with the other Churches, and in the meetings which were subsequently held, the Reformed Presbyterians took a notable part.

The adjusting of the terms of incorporation did not turn out to be difficult. All parties concerned were found to be very much of one mind in regard to the Second Reformation, the Revolution Settlement, and the Headship of Christ; and on 25 May 1876 the union was consummated. Only one minister in the Reformed Presbyterian clergy refused to go along with his brethren, so that the amalgamation was about as complete (says Walker) as it was possible to be. Five congregations refused to go into the union. Of these four rejoined the Minority Synod from the Disruption of 1863.

Since that time the Reformed Presbyterian Church in Scotland has continued from the Minority Synod. One hundred years after the Disruption of 1863 numbers had declined and there were down to 5 congregations and 5 ministers with membership in the five hundreds. Numbers declined even more in the next few years.

In 2026, there are 5 congregations with some additional ministers coming in from outside the denomination; RP numbers increased when the Free Church changed its practise on psalm singing in worship. The denomination maintains strong ties with the Reformed Presbyterian churches in Ireland, Australia and North America.

=== RP churches that joined the Free Church in 1876 ===
Church	Created	Ended	Lifetime....	Notes
Airdrie	1863	1954	91 years	When most of Airdrie RPC seceded to form the Minority Synod 1863, a minority remained in the RPC and acquired a new building. Became Airdrie Graham Street Free Church 1876. Became Airdrie Graham Street UFC 1900. Became Airdrie Graham Street Parish Church 1929. Dissolved 1954.
Ayr	1830	1904	74 years	Disjoined from Kilmarnock 1830. Became Ayr Martyrs' Free Church 1876. Became Ayr Martyrs' UFC 1900. United with St John's UFC 1904 to form Ayr Wallacetown UFC.
Castle Douglas	1806	1923	117 years	Disjoined from Quarrelwood and from Newton Stewart 1806. Became Castle Douglas Macmillan Free Church 1876. Became Castle Douglas Queen Street UFC 1900. United with Trinity and with St George's 1923 to form Castle Douglas UFC.
Chirnside	1776	1919	143 years	Disjoined from the Southern Congregation (as Merse and Teviotdale) 1776. Became Chirnside Free Church 1876. Became Chirnside West UFC 1900. United with Erskine UFC to form Chirnside UFC 1919.
Coatbridge	1869	1993	124 years	Planted from Airdrie 1869. Became Coatbridge East Free Church 1876. Became Coatbridge East UFC 1900. Became Coatbridge Maxwell Parish Church 1929. United with Dunbeth and with Gartsherrie 1993 to form Coatbridge St Andrew's Parish Church.
Crookedholm/Kilmarnock	1776	1958	182 years	Disjoined from the Northern Congregation (as Renfrewshire and Ayrshire) 1776. Relocated to Kilmarnock 1825. Became Kilmarnock Martyrs' Free Church 1876. Became Kilmarnock Martyrs' UFC 1900. Became Kilmarnock Martyrs' Parish Church 1929. Dissolved 1958.
Darvel	1801	1956	155 years	Disjoined from Crookedholm 1801. Became Darvel Free Church 1876. Became Darvel Easton Memorial UFC 1900. Became Darvel Easton Memorial Parish Church 1929. United with Irvine Bank to form Darvel Irvine Bank & Easton Memorial Parish Church 1956.
Douglas Water	1807	1959	152 years	Disjoined from Penpont 1807. Became Douglas Water Free Church 1876 (a minority joined the Church of Scotland; some joined the Minority Synod). Became Douglas Water UFC 1900. Became Rigside Parish Church 1929. United with Douglas Water to form Douglas Water and Rigside Parish Church 1959.
Dundee	1831	1973	142 years	Became Dundee Martyrs' Free Church 1876. Became Dundee Martyrs' UFC 1900. Became Dundee Martyrs' Parish Church 1929. United with Balgay St Thomas's 1973 to form Dundee Balgay Parish Church.
Dunscore	1874	1950s	c. 80 years	Services from 1840s, mission station from 1866. Became Dunscore Craig Free Church 1876. Became Dunscore Craig UFC 1900. Became Dunscore Craig Parish Church 1929. Joined United Free Church (Continuing) 1933. Closed 1950s.
Edinburgh	1818	1909	91 years	Disjoined from Loanhead 1818. Became Edinburgh Martyrs' Free Church 1876. Became Edinburgh Martyrs' UFC 1900. United with St John's 1909 to form Edinburgh Martyrs' and St John's UFC.
Eskdalemuir and Ettrick	1839	1912	73 years	Became Eskdalemuir Free Church 1876. Became Eskdalemuir UFC 1900. Reduced to a preaching station 1912.
Girvan	1845	1879	34 years	Disjoined from Colmonell 1845. Became Girvan West Free Church 1876. Reduced to a preaching station under Girvan Free Church 1879.
Glasgow: Landressy Street	1863	1932	69 years	Planted from Great Hamilton Street 1863 (mission station from 1851). Became Glasgow Barrowfield Free Church 1876. Became Glasgow Barrowfield UFC 1900. Became Glasgow Barrowfield Edgar Memorial Parish Church 1929. United with Bridgeton West to form Glasgow Bridgeton West and Barrowfield Parish Church 1932.
Glasgow: Renwick	1853	1941	88 years	Planted from Great Hamilton Street 1853. Became Glasgow Renwick Free Church 1876. Became Glasgow Renwick UFC 1900. Became Glasgow Renwick Parish Church 1929. United with Laurieston to form Glasgow Laurieston-Renwick Parish Church 1941.
Glasgow: St George's Road	1859	1930	71 years	Seceded from Glasgow West Campbell Street 1859. Became Glasgow St George's Road Free Church 1876. Became Glasgow Grant Street UPC 1900. Became Glasgow Grant Street Parish Church 1929. United with Shamrock Street to form Glasgow Garnethill Parish Church 1930.
Glasgow: West Campbell Street	1835	1934	99 years	Seceded from Glasgow Great Hamilton Street 1835. Joined the Church of Scotland and became Glasgow St Vincent Parish Church 1876. United with Kent Road to form Glasgow Kent Road St Vincent's Parish Church 1934.
Greenock: West Shaw Street	1861	1924	63 years	Seceded from Greenock 1861. Became Greenock Martyrs' Free Church 1876. Became Greenock Martyrs' UFC 1900. United with Greenock North to form Greenock Martyrs' & North UFC 1924.
Hightae	1829	1904	75 years	Formerly a Relief church; joined Quarrelwood RPC 1808. Disjoined from Quarrelwood 1829. Became Hightae Free Church 1876. Became Hightae UFC 1900. United with Dalton to form Dalton and Hightae UFC 1904.
Kilbirnie	1823	1964	141 years	Disjoined from Kilmacolm 1823. Became Kilbirnie West Free Church 1876. Became Kilbirnie West UFC 1900. Became Kilbirnie West Parish Church 1929. United with Kilbirnie East to form Kilbirnie St Columba's Parish Church 1964.
Kilmacolm/Port Glasgow	1785	1905	120 years	Disjoined from Crookedholm (as Renfrewshire) 1785. Relocated to Port Glasgow 1854. Became Port Glasgow Newark Free Church 1876. Became Port Glasgow Newark UFC 1900. Absorbed into Port Glasgow West UFC 1905.
Laurieston	1783	1945	162 years	Disjoined from Stirling (as Linlithgow, Bo'ness and Falkirk) 1783. Became Laurieston Free Church 1876. Became Falkirk Laurieston West UFC 1900. Became Falkirk Laurieston West Parish Church 1929. United with Laurieston St Columba's 1945 to form Falkirk Laurieston Parish Church.
Lochgilphead	1845	1905	60 years	Disjoined from Lorn 1845 (mission station from 1831). Became Lochgilphead Martyrs' Free Church 1876. Became Lochgilphead Martyrs' UFC 1900. Absorbed into Lochgilphead UFC 1905.
New Cumnock	1815	1918	103 years	Covenanters present in the village from 1780. One congregation with Darvel from 1804. Disjoined from Darvel 1815. Became New Cumnock Afton Free Church 1876. Became New Cumnock Afton UFC 1900. United with Arthur Memorial to form New Cumnock UFC 1918.
Newton Stewart	1786	1909	123 years	Disjoined from the Southern Congregation (as Galloway) 1786. Became Newton Stewart Free Church 1876. Became Newton Stewart Rutherford UFC 1900. United with Creebridge 1909 to form Newton Stewart Trinity UFC.
Paisley	1803	1972	169 years	Disjoined from Kilmacolm 1803. Became Paisley Oakshaw Free Church 1876. Became Paisley Oakshaw West UFC 1900. Became Paisley Oakshaw West Parish Church 1929. United with Paisley South to form Paisley St Luke's Parish Church 1972.
Penpont or Scaurbridge	1796	1911	115 years	Disjoined from Newton Stewart 1796. Became Penpont West Free Church 1876. Became Penpont West UFC 1900. United with Burnhead 1911 to form Scaurbridge and Burnhead UFC.
Quarrelwood/Dumfries	1763	1924	161 years	One of the two original congregations (the Southern Congregation) created in 1763. Relocated to Dumfries 1832. Became Dumfries Martyrs' Free Church 1876. Became Dumfries Martyrs' UFC 1900. Dissolved 1924.
Renton	1784	1910	126 years	Began as a Burgher, then from 1800 an Original (Auld Licht) Burgher, church. Declined to join both the Church of Scotland (1839) and the Original Secession Church (1842), instead joining the RPC in 1842. Became Renton Levenside Free Church 1876. Became Renton Levenside UPC 1900. United with South to form Renton Levenside and South UPC 1910.
Rutherglen	1870	1981	111 years	Became Rutherglen East Free Church 1876. Became Rutherglen East UFC 1900. Became Rutherglen East Parish Church 1929. Absorbed into Rutherglen Old Parish Church 1981.
Sandhills/Glasgow	1787	1949	162 years	Covenanters in the area in 1680. Formed part of the Northern Congregation 1763. Disjoined from Pentland 1787. Relocated to Glasgow c. 1800. Church on Great Hamilton Street built 1819. Became Glasgow Great Hamilton Street Free Church 1876. Became Glasgow Great Hamilton Street UFC 1900. Became Glasgow Macmillan Parish Church 1929. United with Calton Relief to form Glasgow Macmillan-Calton Parish Church 1949.
Stirling	1777	1909	132 years	Disjoined from the Northern Congregation 1777. Became Stirling Craigs Free Church 1876. Became Stirling Craigs UFC 1900. United with North to form Stirling North and Craigs UFC 1909.
Strathmiglo	1824	1899	75 years	Became Strathmiglo North Free Church 1876. United with South to form Strathmiglo Free Church 1899.
Wick	1838	1911	73 years	Became Wick Martyrs' Free Church 1876. Became Wick Martyrs' UFC 1900. Absorbed into Pulteneytown Central UFC 1911.

=== RP churches that formed, or joined, the Minority Synod ===
The eight congregations of the Minority Synod of 1863 had grown to twelve by 1876. In 1903 there were ten. By 1963 there were only five (Greenock, Paisley, Penpont, Thurso and Edinburgh having closed or left), which five also remained in 1993: Stranraer, Wishaw, Loanhead, Airdrie and one other. Loanhead, Wishaw and the other subsequently closed, but a new church was started in Stornoway in 2011 following the Free Church's move away from exclusive psalmody, and new churches were planted in Edinburgh and Glasgow in 2012, restoring the total to five.

Church	Created	Ended	Lifetime.....	Notes
Airdrie	1807	extant	218+ years	Disjoined from Glasgow 1807. Majority of the church formed the Minority Synod in 1863.
Girvan	1863	1886	23 years	A minority formed the Minority Synod 1863, which church lasted until 1886.
Greenock	1825	1954	129 years	Disjoined from Kilmacolm 1825. Seceded to form the Minority Synod 1863.
Hamilton/Wishaw	1777	2005	228 years	Disjoined from the Northern Congregation 1777. Relocated to Wishaw 1792. Seceded to form the Minority Synod 1863. Closed 2005. (As of 2024, Airdrie holds monthly services in the Wishaw building.)
Lorn	1863	1893	30 years	See below. A minority of Lorn RPC seceded to form the Minority Synod 1863, which church lasted until 1893.
Paisley	1863	1940	77 years	A minority seceded to join the Minority Synod. Dissolved 1940.
Penpont	1863	1930s	70 years	A minority seceded to join the Minority Synod. Dissolved 1930s.
Pentland/Loanhead	1763	1990s	230 years	Covenanters present in the village from 1680. One of the two original congregations (the Northern Congregation) created in 1763. Relocated to Loanhead 1792. Seceded to form the Minority Synod 1863. Closed 1990s.
Thurso	1833	1928	95 years	Mission station only. Seceded to form the Minority Synod 1863. Dissolved.
Wick	1863	1893	30 years	A minority joined the Minority Synod, which church lasted until 1893.
Douglas Water	1876	1885	9 years	Some joined the Minority Synod at the Union 1876, which church lasted until 1885
Rothesay	1829	1881	52 years	Joined the Minority Synod 1876. Closed 1881.
Whithorn	1822	1899	77 years	Disjoined from Newton Stewart 1822. Refused to join the Free Church and joined the Minority Synod 1876. Closed 1899.
Stranraer	1796	extant	229+ years	Disjoined from Newton Stewart 1796. Refused to join the Free Church in 1876; joined the Minority Synod 1887.
Edinburgh		1970s		Originally an independent Seceder church. Joined RPC 1903-10.
Stornoway	2011	extant	14+ years	Formed following the Free Church's move away from exclusive psalmody
North Edinburgh	2012	extant	13+ years	Church plant, meeting in a school.
Glasgow	2012	extant	13+ years	Church plant, at first meeting in a school.

=== Other congregations ===
Church	Created	Ended	Lifetime..	Notes
Carnoustie	1809	1919	110 years	Originally Constitutional Presbytery (Auld Licht Anti-Burgher). Became Original Secession 1827, United Original Secession 1842 and Free Church 1852. Joined RPC 1862. Became Original Secession again 1875. Dissolved 1919.
Colmonell or Poundland	1810	1874	64 years	Dissolved.
Eaglesham	1818	1878	60 years	Disjoined from Glasgow 1818. Dissolved 1878.
Inverkeithing/Dunfermline	1777	1791	14 years	Dissolved.
Kelso	1820	1869	49 years	Disjoined from Chirnside 1820. Dissolved.
Lesmahagow	1844	1868	24 years	Secession from Lesmahagow Free Church (originally Original Burgher) 1844. Dissolved.
Liverpool	1827			Originally a charge of the Irish Reformed Synod. Joined RPC 1857. Joined English Presbyterian Church 1876. (Some instead joined the Reformed Presbyterians of Ireland.) Further history unknown.
London	1856	1862	6 years	Minister and majority seceded 1859. Dissolved 1862.
Lorn	1787	1876	89 years	No minister pre 1844, served by ordained missionaries 1844-76. Minority seceded to form the Minority Synod 1863. Merged into Kilbrandon & Kilchattan Free Church 1876.
Manchester	1871	1874	3 years	Dissolved.
Sanquhar	1836	1841	5 years	Disjoined from Penpont 1836. Dissolved.
Stromness	1859	1874	15 years	Dissolved.

== Current congregations ==
Church	Location	Web	Founded
Airdrie RPCS	Airdrie, North Lanarkshire		1807
Glasgow RPCS	Partick, Glasgow		2012
North Edinburgh RPCS	Muirhouse, Edinburgh		2012
Stornoway RPCS	Stornoway, Na h-Eileanan Siar		2011
Stranraer RPCS	Stranraer, Dumfries and Galloway		1796

== Foreign missions ==
In 2026, the denomination is involved in several foreign missions, including;

=== Europe ===
The Scottish Church has a direct input into mission work in Nantes, France, and Seville, Spain, via a mission committee which operates under the oversight of the Irish and Scottish RP Churches.

=== Gambia ===
In May 2023, RPCS ordained a Gambian minister to pastor their first congregation in Brikama.

=== Outside Europe ===
The church also shares in mission work in Chile and Japan.

== Names and nick-names ==
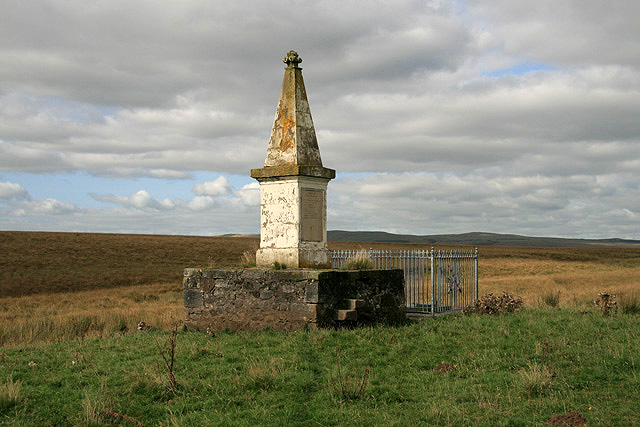
Monument and martyrs' graves on Airds Moss

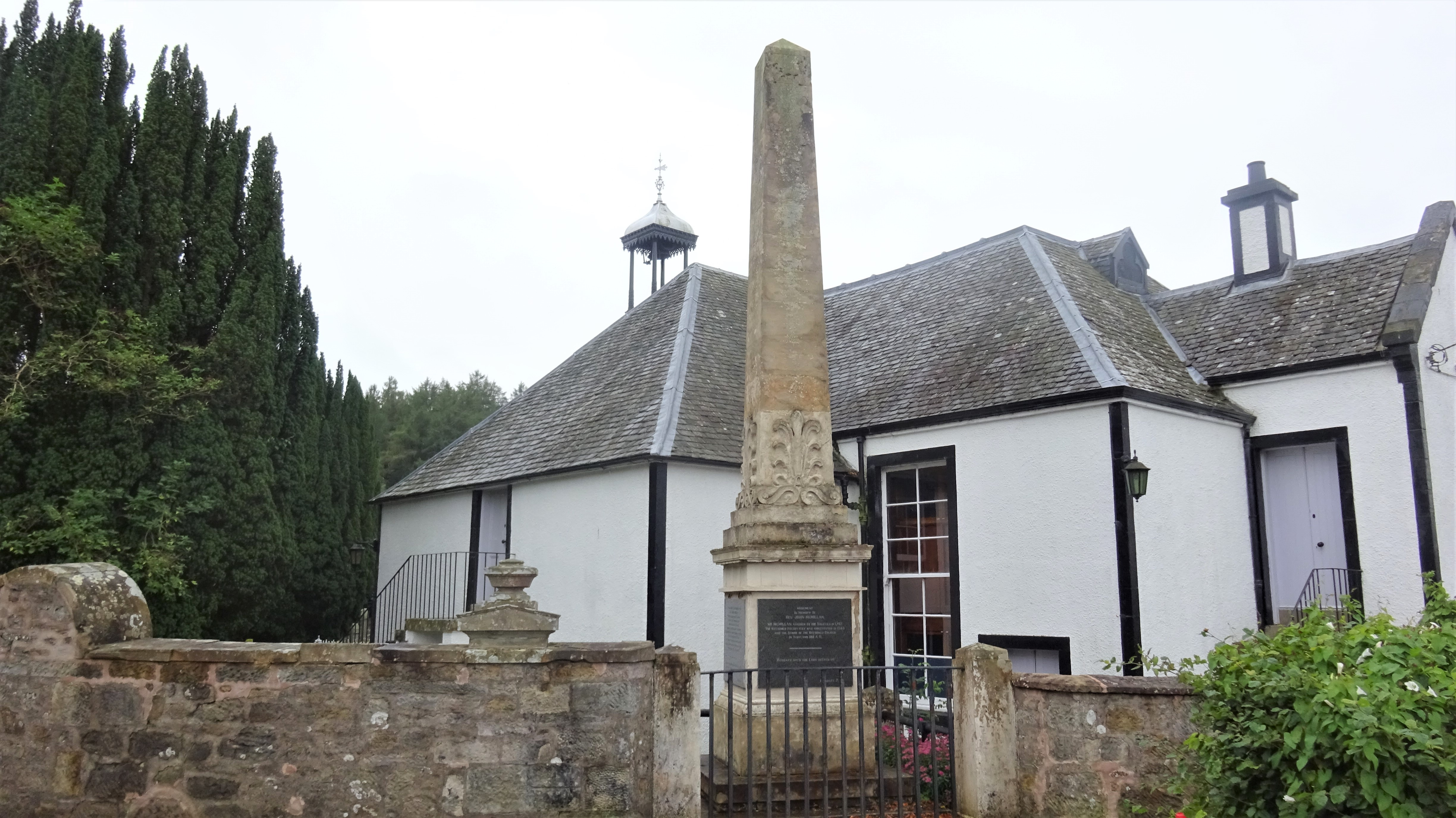
Dalserf Kirk and John M'Millan's memorial

The Old Presbyterian Dissenters have assumed, and received, the appellation of Dissenters, on account of the part which their forefathers acted at the revolution, in 1689, while they openly and candidly dissented from the public deeds of the nation's representatives, in both church and state; considering these deeds as involving a mournful departure from former laudable attainments. The epithet Old has ordinarily been prefixed, to signify that they are of longer standing, as a distinct Body, than any other denomination of Presbyterians who have separated from the Established Church. In some parts of the country, especially in Ireland, they have been called Covenanters, because of their avowed attachment to the National Covenant of Scotland, and the Solemn League and Covenant of the three kingdoms.

Various nick-names are frequently given to them by others. They have been called Whigs,a term which, it is well known, has often been applied to the zealous friends of civil or religious liberty. Cameronians, from the Rev. Richard Cameron, who was killed at Airsmoss, in Kyle, on 20 July 1680. Mountain-men, on account of their adhering to the same cause with those who supported and countenanced the faithful preaching of the Gospel on the mountains and moors of Scotland during the persecution; and because they themselves, in want of better conveniency, have often been obliged, even since the revolution, to administer ordinances in the open fields, though this is not so much the case now as it once was. M'Millanites, from the name of the first minister who espoused their cause after the revolution. Were the intention of the imposer good, (say the Synod) all these nick-names might be considered as very harmless.

They may also be called the Reformed, or Reformation Presbytery; while, in another point of view, they might, with equal propriety, be denominated the Dissenting Presbytery.

== See also ==
- Presbyterianism
- Calvinism
- Cameronians
- Covenanters
- Solemn League and Covenant
- Free Church of Scotland (Continuing)
