= St Leonard's, Edinburgh =

Neighbourhood of Edinburgh, Scotland

Coordinates: 55.94006897365793°N 3.1748192590334376°W

St Leonard's
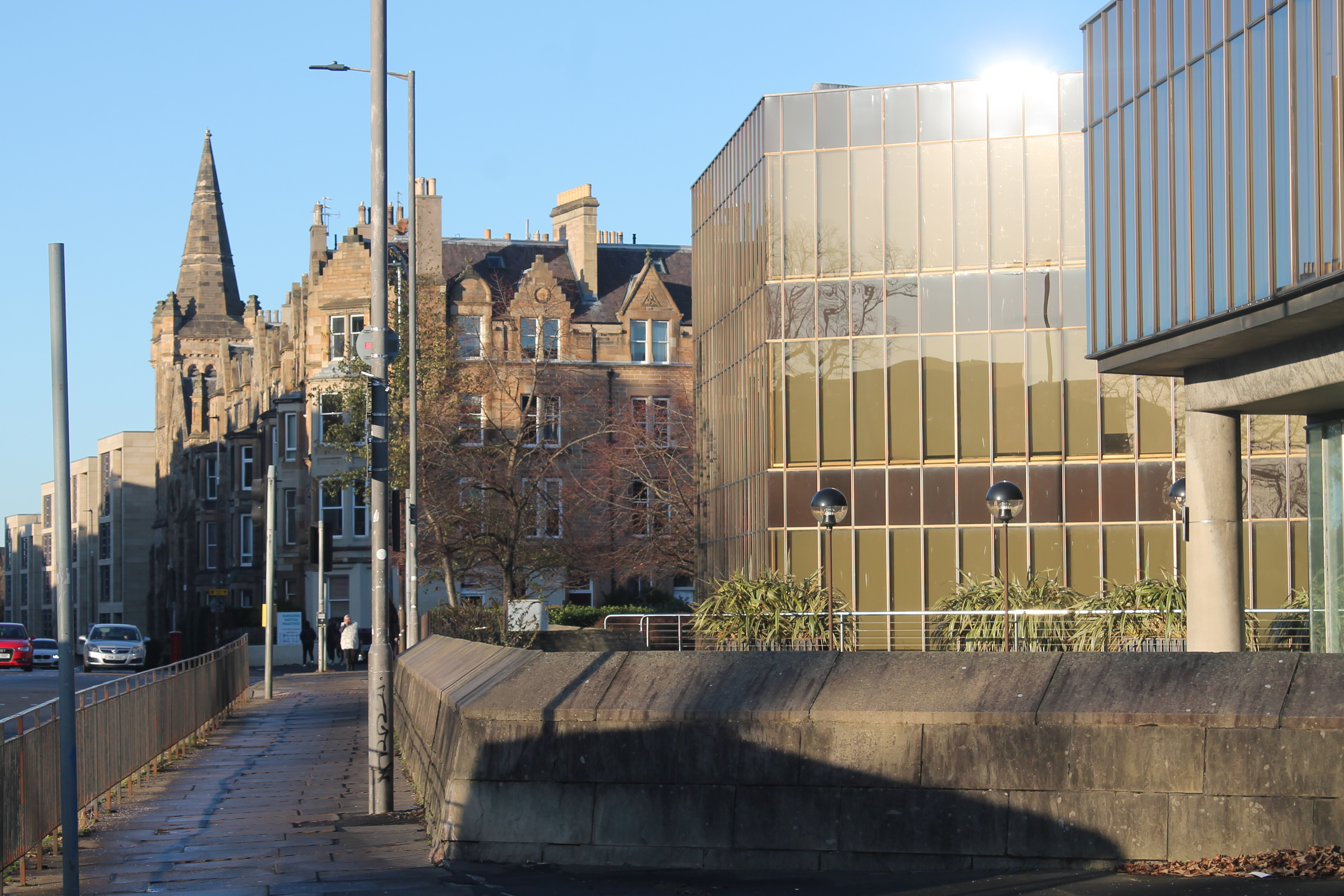
- Dalkeith Road at St Leonard's, looking north

- Location within the City of Edinburgh council area Location within Scotland
- Population: 5,385
- Council area: City of Edinburgh
- Lieutenancy area: Edinburgh
- Country: Scotland
- Sovereign state: United Kingdom
- Post town: EDINBURGH
- Postcode district: EH8, EH9
- Dialling code: 0131
- Police: Scotland
- Fire: Scottish
- Ambulance: Scottish
- UK Parliament: Edinburgh East
- Scottish Parliament: Edinburgh Central

St Leonard's is a neighbourhood of south-central Edinburgh, Scotland, United Kingdom. Once notable as a centre of industry, it is now primarily residential.

The area takes its name from the mediaeval hospital of St Leonard, which stood on St Leonard's Hill on the edge of Holyrood Park. The hospital had fallen out of use by the mid-17th century but, by the middle of the following century, a small village had developed on the east side of the road between Edinburgh and Dalkeith. One prominent house built in this time, Hermits and Termits, survives. In 1831, the Edinburgh and Dalkeith Railway opened its northern terminus at St Leonard's. Later in the 19th century, businesses including Thomas Nelson & Sons publishers and J. & G. Stewart distillers established manufacturing operations in St Leonard's. Industry declined throughout the 20th century with the station and Nelson's Parkside Works closing in 1968. In this period, abortive plans to demolish much of the area in favour of a ring road led to "planning blight" and the destruction of many older properties. Since the 1970s, however, St Leonard's has been redeveloped as a residential neighbourhood.

St Leonard's is the site of the University of Edinburgh's Pollock Halls of Residence, including the Confucius Institute of Scotland. The Royal Commonwealth Pool – used in the 1970, 1986 and 2014 Commonwealth Games – is located here, as is St Leonard's Police Station. Until 2020, Scottish Widows was headquartered in St Leonard's.

== History ==
=== St Leonard's Hospital ===
St Leonard's is named for the mediaeval hospital of St Leonard, which was located on St Leonard's Hill on the site of what is now the former James Clark Technical School at St Leonard's Crag. Saint Leonard was a popular dedicatee of chapels and hospitals in mediaeval Scotland. In addition to St Leonard's College, St Andrews, chapels and/or hospitals dedicated to the saint stood in Ayr, Dunfermline, Lanark, and Roxburghshire. Two other dedications to Saint Leonard existed in Midlothian.

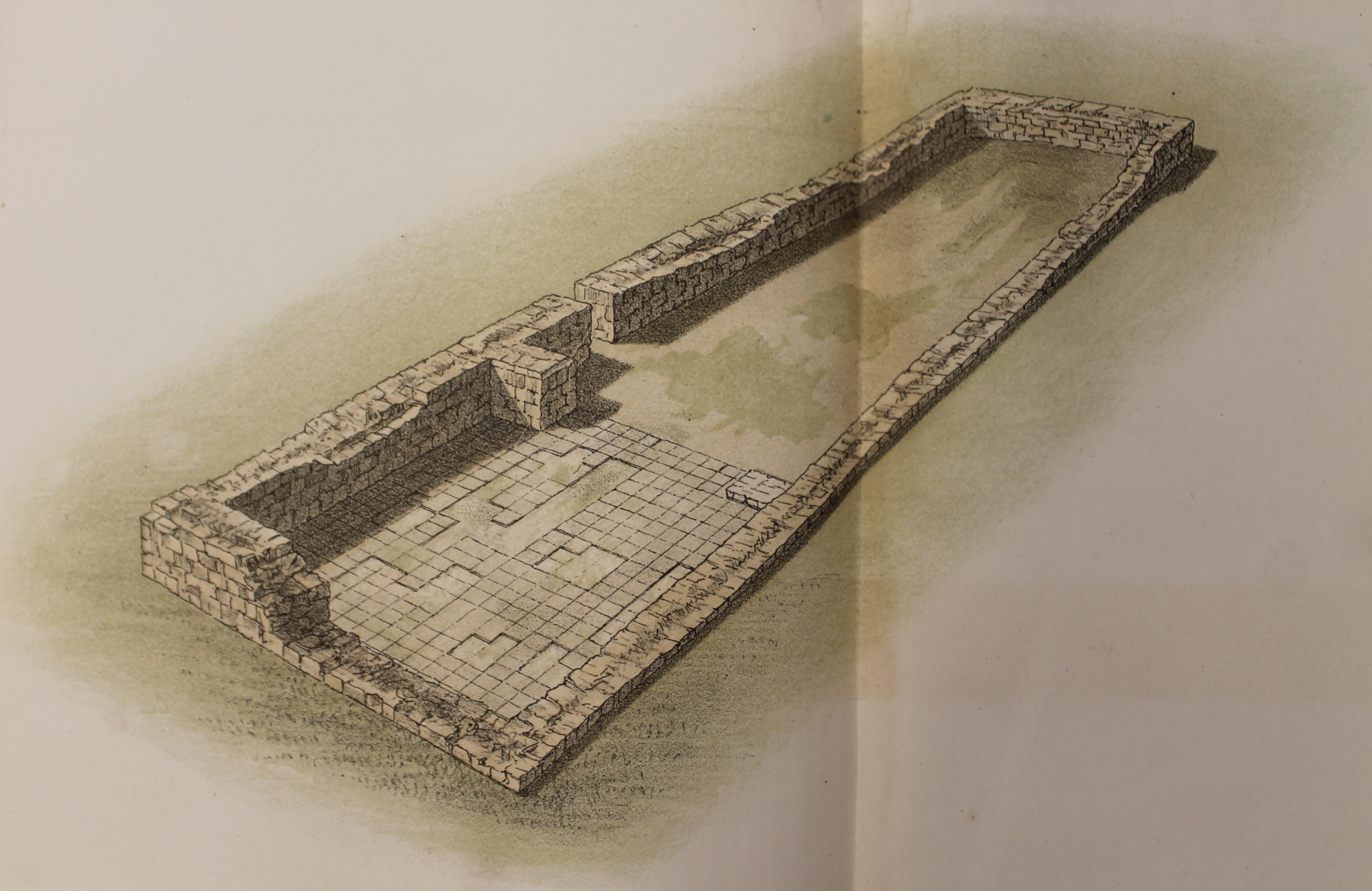
The remains of St Leonard's Hospital as they appeared in the mid-19th century

The hospital was founded by David I. It was granted to Holyrood Abbey by David II. The last building on St Leonard's Hill was erected in 1493: the date of its re-foundation charter from James IV to Robert Bellenden, Abbot of Holyrood. The chapel of these buildings was excavated and demolished between 1854 and 1855. The Incorporation of Hammermen met annually at the chapel with only a few exceptions from 1494 to 1558. On 2 February 1529, members of the Douglas family and allies met near St Leonard's Chapel to form their abortive plot to assassinate James V. The manner of the hospital's decline is uncertain but it had definitely ceased to exist by 1653 when reference is made to "the old ruinous hous and chappell of St. Leonards".

=== The Lands of St Leonards ===
In the mediaeval period, the Lands of St Leonards formed part of the Barony of Broughton, which was gifted to the monks of Holyrood Abbey by David I. It remained in the monks' possession until the Reformation. These lands were bounded to the north by the Canongate and to the east as far south as Priestfield by Holyrood Park. Its western boundary followed the Pleasance southward as far as what is now Drummond Street, whereafter it followed an irregular line to Mounthooly Loan (now East and West Preston Streets), which it then followed to the road to Dalkeith as far as Priestfield.

The Lands of St Leonards are first referred to by that name in a charter issued by David II in 1346. feuing of the lands appears to have begun by the middle of the 15th century, when the eastern side of the street of St Leonard (now the Pleasance) had begun to be feued. Reference is made to a "village of St Leonard" around 1650. This area now forms the northeastern tip of the modern Southside.

At the Reformation, ownership of the Lands of St Leonards continued in the Commendators of Holyrood – successively, Robert Stewart, Adam Bothwell, and John Bothwell – until 1587, when all church lands were annexed to the Crown. That year, James VI granted the charter of Broughton to Sir Lewis Bellenden of Auchnoule. Bellenden's grandson William passed the lands to his maternal uncle, Robert Ker, 1st Earl of Roxburghe in 1627. Charles I granted the charters to the magistrates of Edinburgh as governors of Heriot's Hospital in 1639. From this time until 1737, the lands were known as Heriot's Croft and St Leonard's; in that year, the city council itself took the feu in order to provide ground for George Watson's Hospital. Brown took a large portion of the sub-feu and, from 1766, began to construct George Square, Buccleuch Street, and Buccleuch Place.

=== 17th and 18th centuries ===
After the Battle of Dunbar, David Leslie placed cannon on St Leonard's Hill to protect his men against Oliver Cromwell's advance into Edinburgh. By this time, St Leonard's Hill had become a prominent site for duels: a notable example was that of Robert Aumuchty, who, on 2 April 1600, killed James Wauchope. Aumuchty himself was executed after a failed attempt to escape the Tolbooth.

An estate north of St Leonard's Lane was developed by the Montgomery family as a market garden in the late 17th century. They built a house here in 1700 and were succeeded as proprietors by William Mein, who began to develop buildings on the estate. Mein's wife and then his children held the estate until the end of the 18th century.

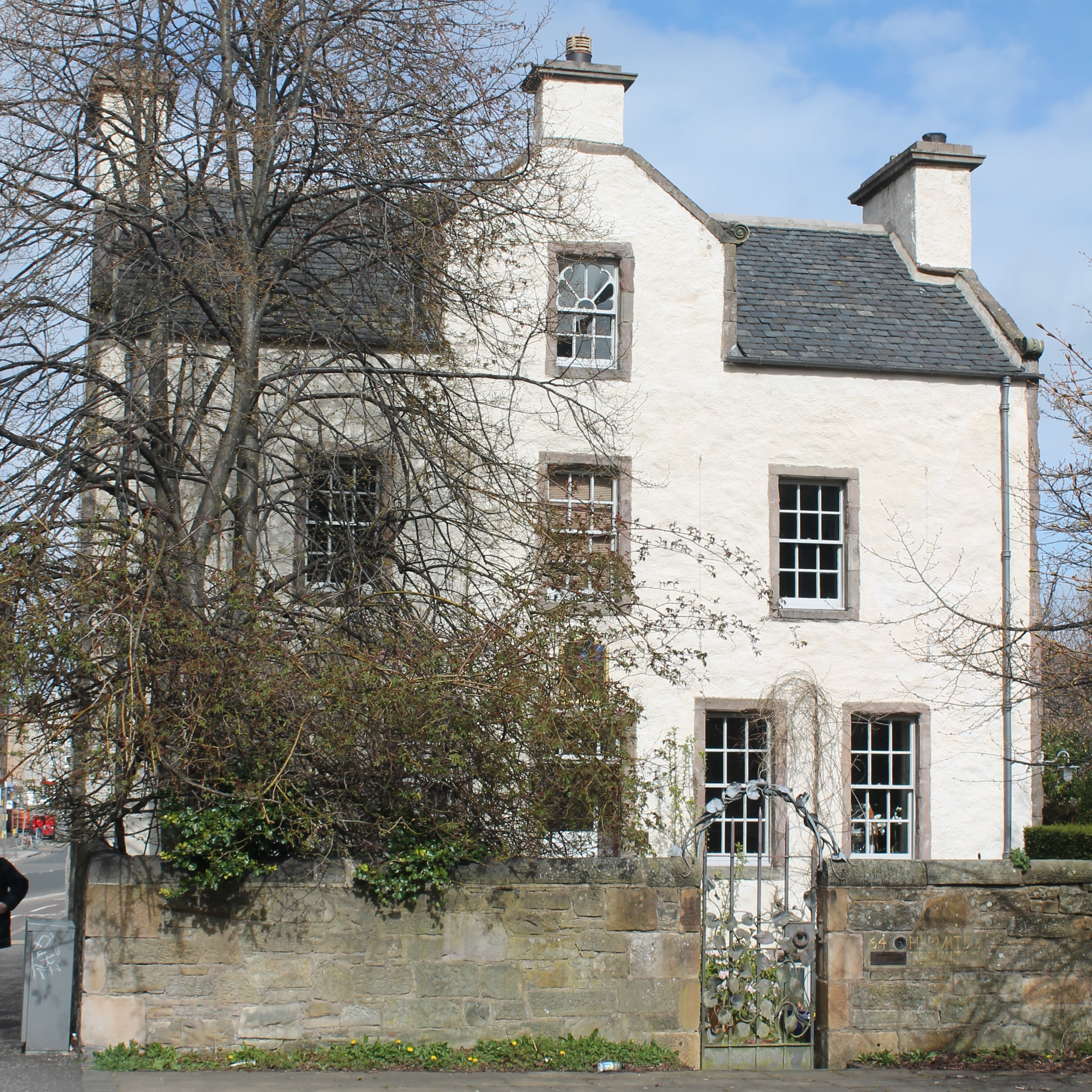
Hermits and Termits: a surviving 18th-century house in St Leonard's

The 18th-century development of St Leonard's around the historic burial grounds at the former hospital occasioned a poet under the nom de plume Claudero to write in 1766:

Grave of the dead thrown up with spade,
Where long they slept full still,
And turnips grow from human pow,
Upon St Leonard's Hill.

By 1734, a village had practically formed in the area of the former crofts of St Leonard's Hospital, known as Hermits and Termits. In this year, the house of the same name was constructed by William Clifton and his wife Mary. South of this, the area known as Parkside was developed with two houses during the tenure of James Brown between 1702 and 1716. One of these, later known as Parkside House, survived until the latter half of the 20th century. Nearby, a four-storey house was constructed in 1728. Though originally called Huntershall, it is recorded as early as 1738 under the name The Castle o' Clouts, apparently in reference to its builder: a wealthy tailor. It stood, latterly as a pub and hotel, until 1970. In 1802, physician Andrew Duncan took a feu of the northern portion of the former crofts. The same year, Jane Cleugh and John Gibson acquired the southern portion, giving it up to the Edinburgh and Dalkeith Railway in 1828.

=== Industry and growth ===
In walking through St. Leonards one soon gains the impression that its inhabitants are mostly of a well-to-do and highly respectable class of the City community. There is an absence even in what may, without offence, be termed its lower and more crowded quarters, of anything like a slum locality.

— George D. Balfour, St. Leonards and its Parish Church (1900)

In 1825, James Jardine recommended St Leonard's as the site of the northern terminus of a railway line to connect the Midlothian coalfields with Edinburgh. The following year, the Edinburgh and Dalkeith Railway opened with its base depot and terminus at St Leonard's. The line opened to goods on 4 July 1831 and to passengers the following year. The yard was soon handling over 200 tons of coal every day. Ironically, despite post-dating the invention of the steam engine and despite its main cargo being coal, the line was horse-drawn.

Comparing the horse-drawn line's leisurely and scenic route to the unseemliness of its larger, steam-powered counterparts, Robert Chambers referred to "the innocence of the railway" and the name Innocent Railway soon stuck.

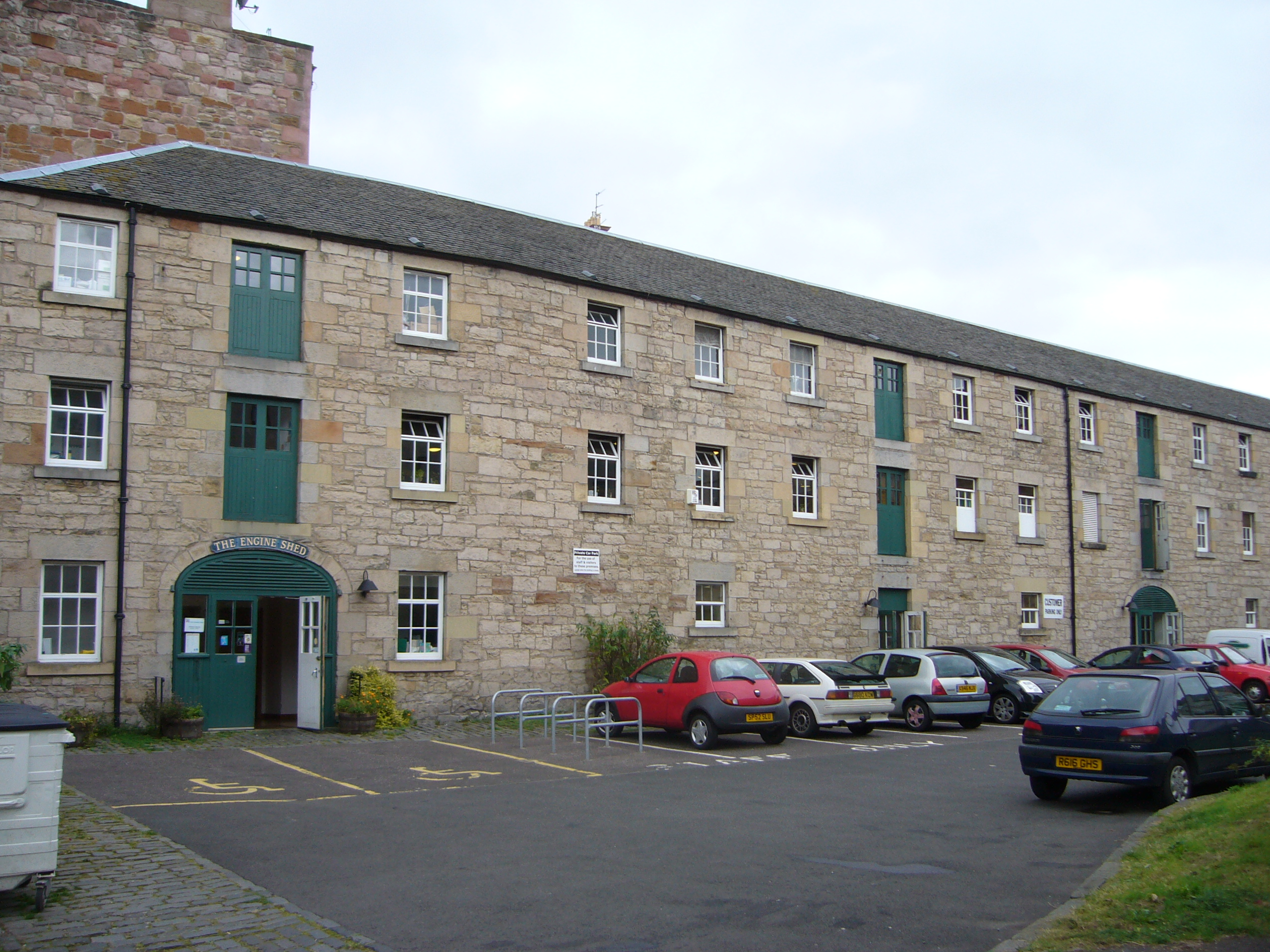
Buildings of St Leonard's station and goods yard, opened in 1831 and closed in 1968

The North British Railway purchased the Edinburgh & Dalkeith in 1845 and the railway began to use steam engines the following year. St Leonard's Station closed to passengers in 1847, while remaining in use for coal. There was an abortive attempt to reintroduce passenger trains in 1860. The introduction of steam engines occasioned the expansion of tracks, support facilities, and commercial enterprises at the St Leonard's yard, including what was then the world's largest bonded warehouse.

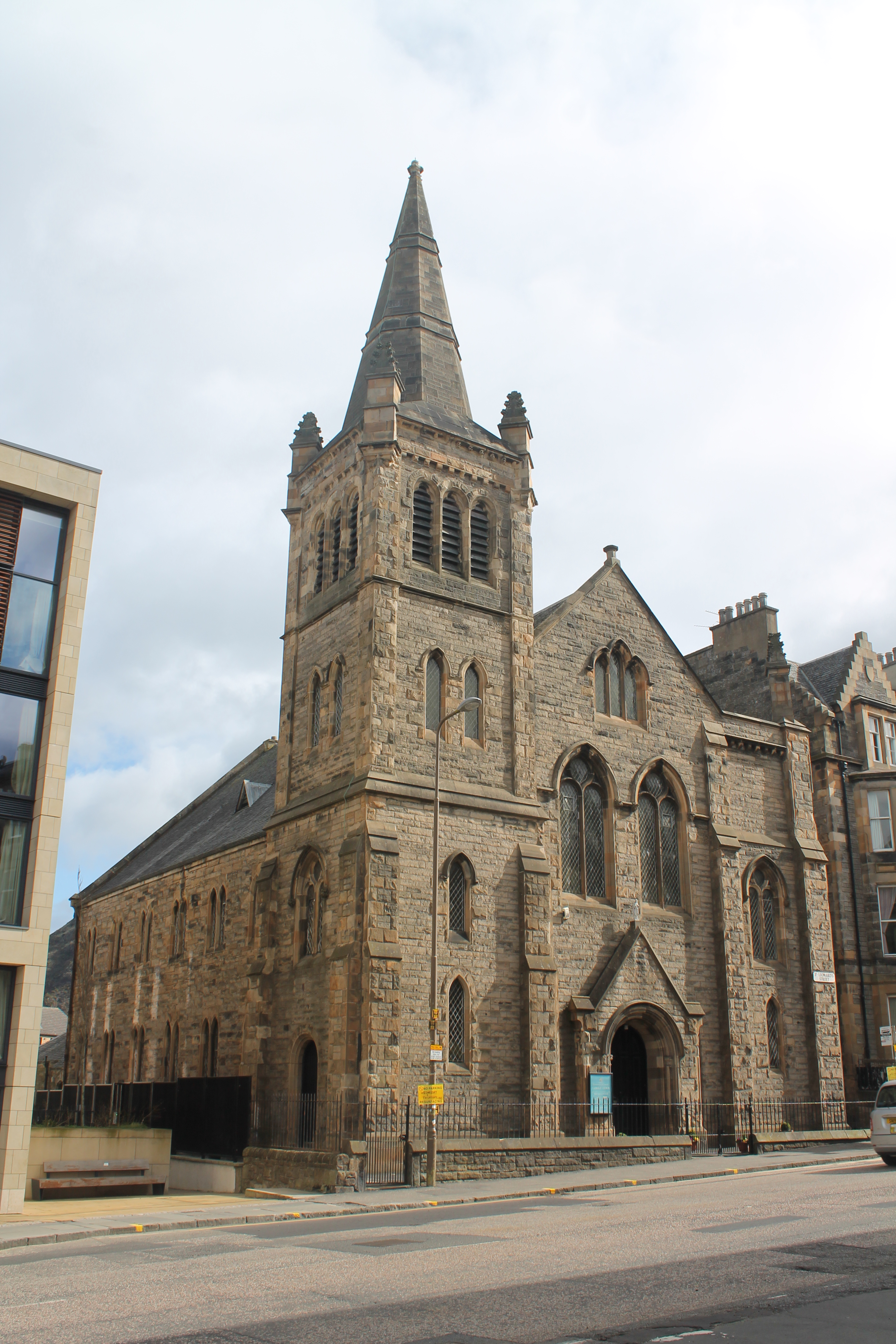
The former St Leonard's Parish Church, opened in 1880; now St Margaret's and St Leonard's Catholic Church

The Church of Scotland responded to the area's growing population with the establishment of St Paul's Church with a parish quoad sacra in 1836. At the Disruption of 1843, the church's minister, Robert Elder led almost all the congregation out of the established church and into the newly formed Free Church. Unusually among seceding congregations, St Paul's retained the use of its building. A further Church of Scotland congregation, St Leonard's, opened on 6 April 1879. On 21 November the same year, the church was gutted by fire but was soon rebuilt, reopening on 21 May 1880 and becoming a charge quoad sacra in 1883.

After Thomas Nelson & Sons works at Hope Park were destroyed by fire on 10 April 1878, the company moved production to the Parkside Works in St Leonard's, opening on 16 July 1880. Even before this move, the Nelson family was well-established in St Leonard's. In 1860, William Nelson purchased then greatly altered Salisbury Green: a house built sometime between 1770 and 1780 for Alexander Scott. In 1867, William's brother Thomas Nelson purchased the lands "commonly known as Parkside" and constructed a new house, St Leonard's. The Nelsons also established a recreation ground and the Parkside Institute on Dalkeith Road for the use of their employees as well as a bowling green on the southside of Holyrood Park Road. It remains in use as the Parkside Bowling Club. In 1913, they founded the Nelson Hall at Spittalfield Crescent on the opposite side of St Leonard's Street in the Southside. J. & G. Stewart had a distillery behind the Parkside works while Usher's operated the Park Brewery in the vicinity.

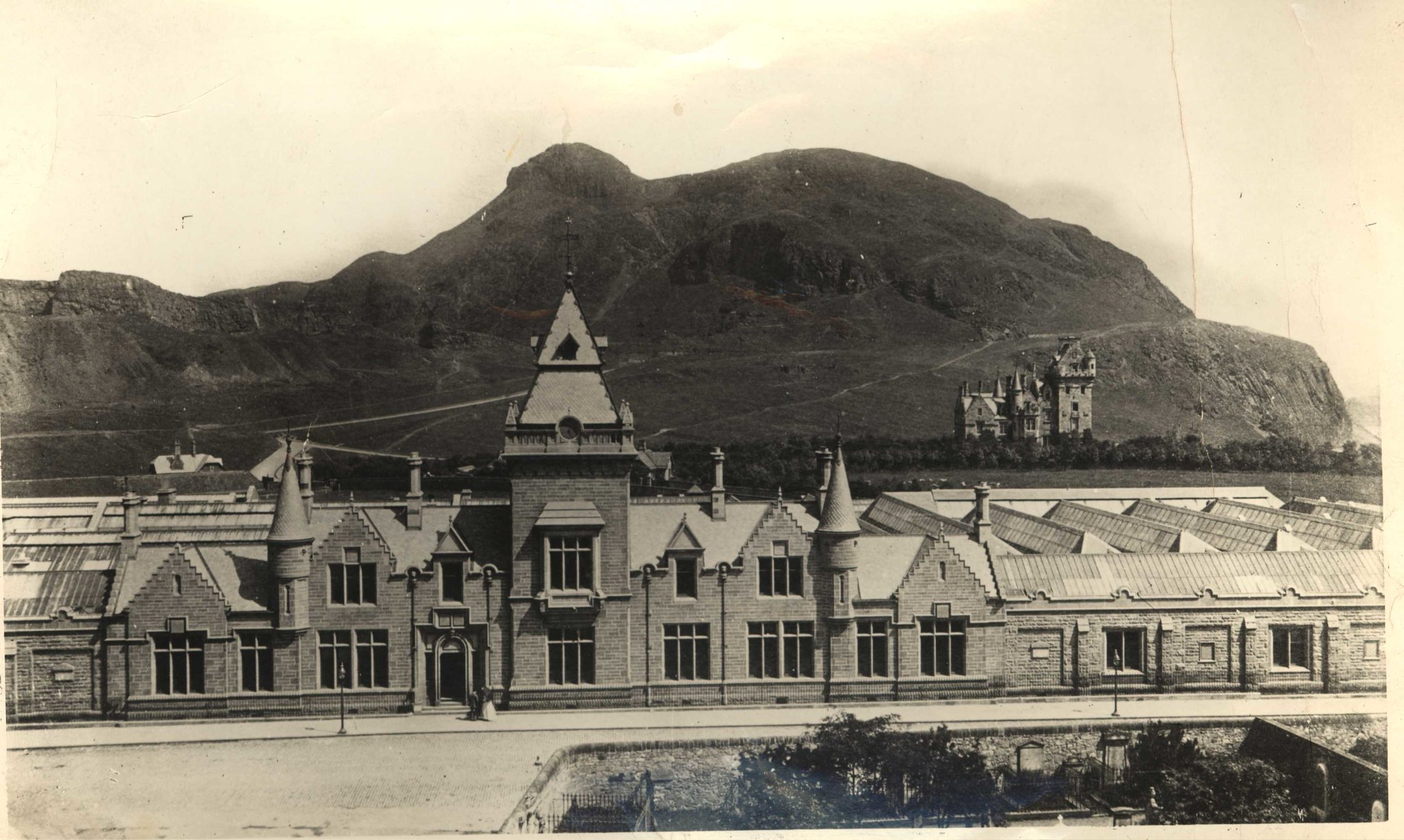
The Parkside Works: operated by the publishing firm Thomas Nelson & Sons between 1880 and 1968; Thomas Nelson the younger's house, St Leonard's, is visible in the background right

In this period, population growth was reflected by the establishment in 1876 of St Leonard's School between Forbes Street and St Leonard's Hill. In 1913, James Clark Technical School was constructed on St Leonard's Hill.

=== 1918–1968 ===
In the period leading up to the Second World War, establishments in St Leonard's witnessed further changes. St Leonard's School closed in 1931 and its buildings were retained as an annexe to the nearby James Clark School. In 1925, St Trinnean's School moved from 10 Palmerston Road in Marchmont to St Leonard's. The school, a progressive establishment, partly inspired Ronald Searle to create the St Trinian's cartoon series. St Trinnean's closed in 1946.

St Leonard's Parish Church united with Newington Parish Church in 1932 to form Newington and St Leonard's Parish Church. The St Leonard's Buildings were sold to a Churches of Christ congregation, which took the name Dalkeith Road Church of Christ. St Paul's Church, which had rejoined the Church of Scotland in 1929, united with Newington East on 4 October 1942. The St Paul's buildings were leased to Edinburgh Corporation for use as an annexe to the nearby James Clark Technical School. In 1948, the council converted the church into the Cygnet Theatre. The theatre had ceased to function by 1954, when the church was again being used by James Clark Technical School and by Preston Street School. In 1958, the building was sold to a private buyer before being demolished in 1980 to make way for St Leonard's Police Station.

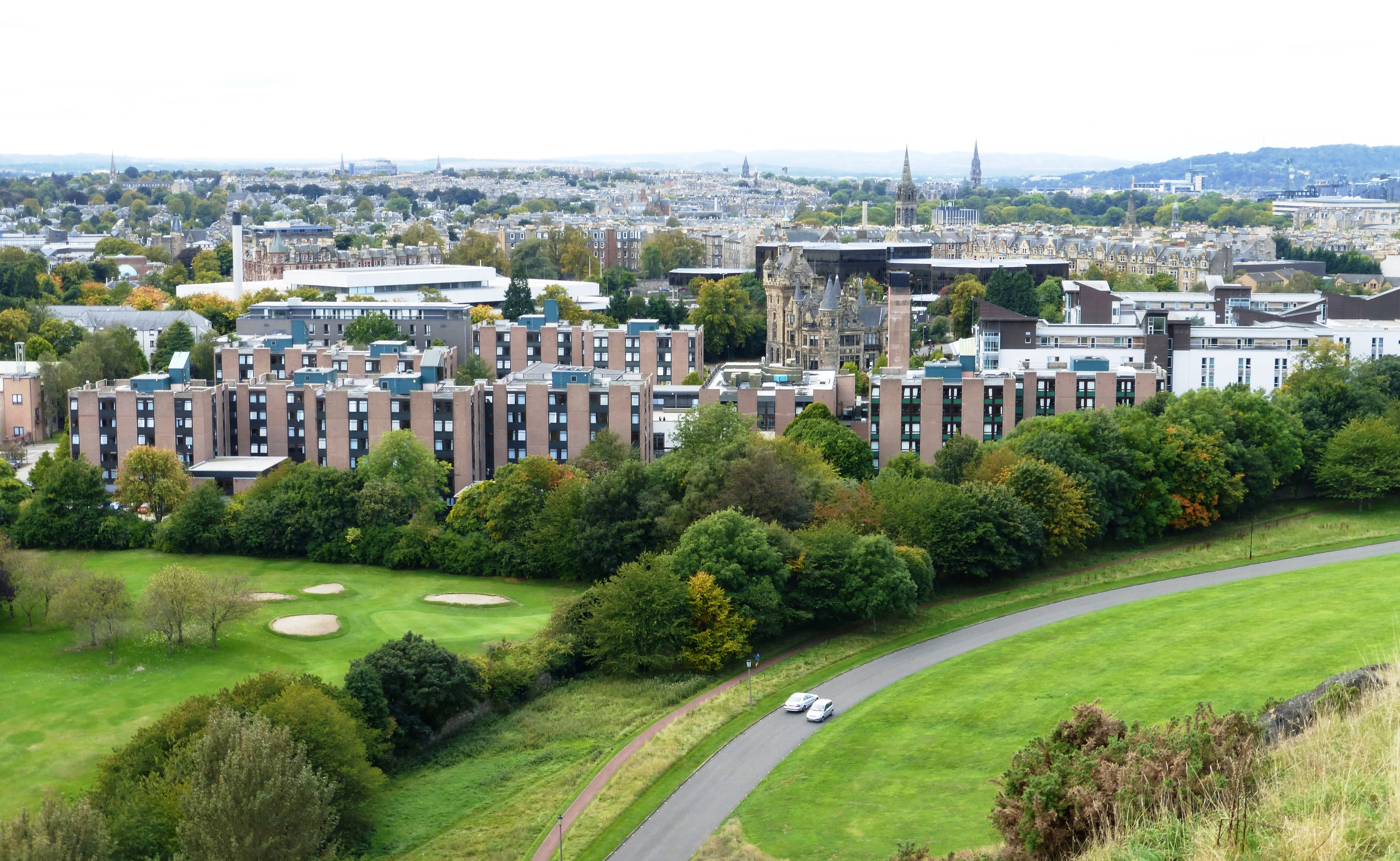
The University of Edinburgh's Pollock Halls site, seen from Arthur's Seat

During the interwar period, the University of Edinburgh, supported by John Donald Pollock, began to purchase land around the Salisbury Green area in southern St Leonard's. The university acquired Abden House in 1935, St Leonard's in 1936, and Salisbury Green in 1942. Salisbury Green became a residence for males students in 1946 and St Leonard's became a residence for female students the following year. In 1950, William Kininmonth was commissioned to create a new complex of student residences at Salisbury Green. The site was named Pollock Halls in memory of John Donald Pollock's parents. Development continued there into the first decade of the 21st century.

=== Deindustrialisation ===
St. Leonard's, an ancient and unsophisticated southern suburb of Edinburgh, is rarely visited by the itinerant tourist, for the adverse effects of nineteenth century industrialisation and the present-day results of post-war planning blight have combined to give it a depressing appearance.

— David J. Black, An Historical Account (1972)

With the closure of the last coalyard at St Leonard's, Hugh Leckie & Sons, the rail depot closed in 1968. The same year, the printing and binding division of Nelson's was sold to Morrison & Gibb and the Parkside Works were demolished. In 1970, Scottish Widows purchased the former site of the Parkside Works as a site for its headquarters. The building, designed by Basil Spence, opened in 1976. On the opposite site of Holyrood Park Road, the Royal Commonwealth Pool opened ahead of the 1970 British Commonwealth Games, which used the pool as a venue. The pool was again used as a venue for the 1986, and 2014 Commonwealth Games.

The city corporation's 1965 development plan proposed an arterial road through the western edge of Holyrood Park; the road was planned to enter St Leonard's at the goods yard, continuing along the line of Montague Street to the intersection of a new north–south leg of a proposed inner ring-road, which would run in between and parallel to the Pleasance and Nicolson Street. As with the Southside and Dumbiedykes, planned redevelopment in the postwar period discouraged investment in properties by private landlords or by the city corporation. This resulted in "planning blight", which saw the condition of properties deteriorate even further. In the early 1960s alone, 1,030 residences were demolished in the area of St Leonard's and Dumbiedykes and 1,977 people were displaced.

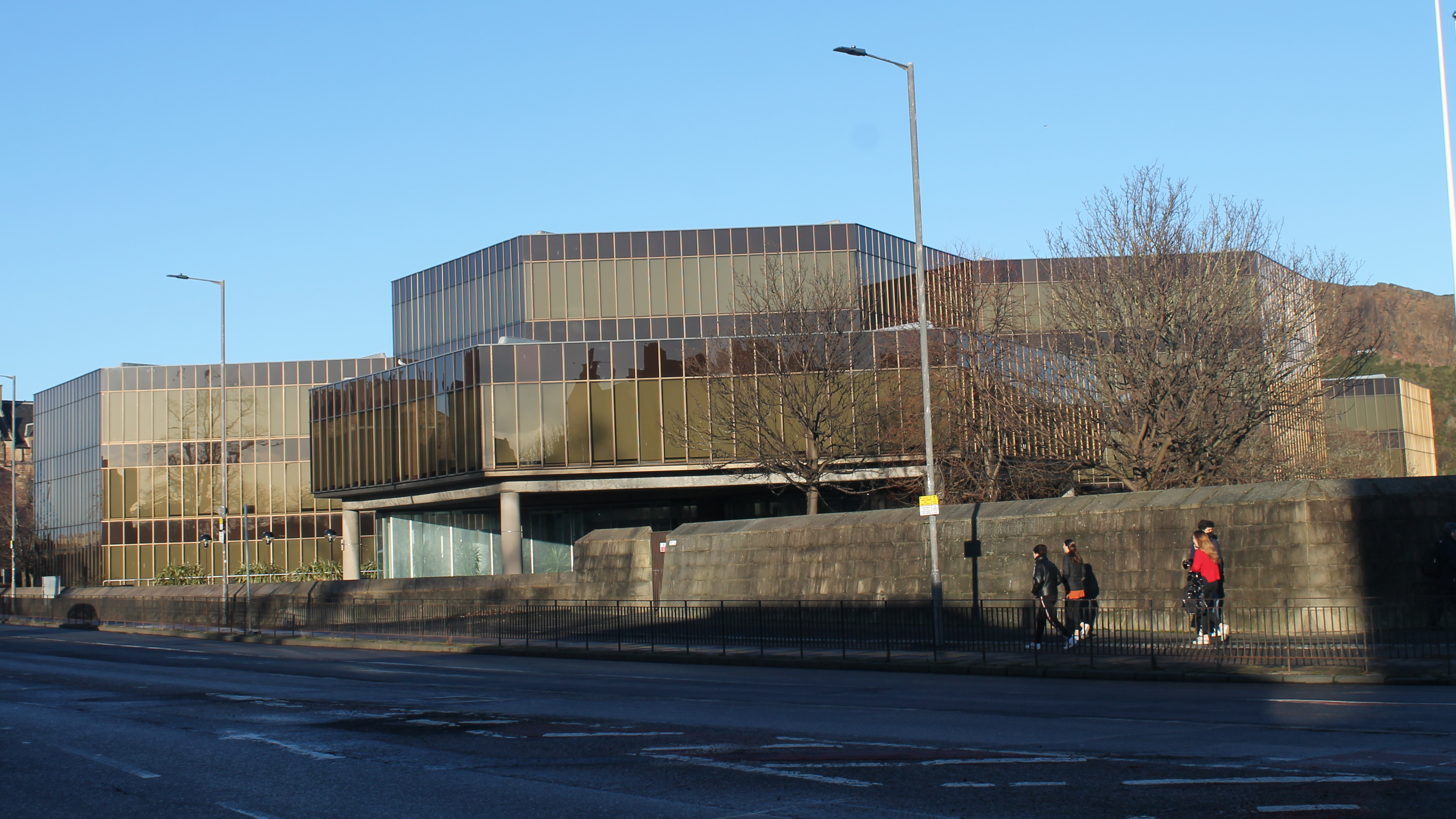
The headquarters of Scottish Widows between 1976 and 2020

James Clark School closed in 1972 and was used as an annexe of St Thomas of Aquin's High School until 1984. After this, the building was developed as flats. The former St Leonard's School was demolished in the 1980s, having latterly served as a dining annexe to St Thomas of Aquin's.

=== Redevelopment ===
Dalkeith Road Church of Christ, like most other Churches of Christ in the UK, joined the United Reformed Church in 1981. The congregation united with Augustine Congregational Church on George IV Bridge to form Augustine United Church in 1992. Since that year, the buildings have been used by the Society of St Pius X under the name St Margaret's and St Leonard's Catholic Church.

After the creation of Lothian Regional Council in 1975, the road plans were abandoned and the former rail depot was redeveloped for housing. Between the 1970s and the 1990s, extensive new residential developments were constructed gap sites in St Leonard's. In 1994, a portion of the former Innocent Railway between St Leonard's and Brunstane was developed as part of the National Cycle Network. It remains a popular route for cyclists and pedestrians.

In 1990, the St Leonard's Police Station on St Leonard's Street opened. In 2019, Holyrood Distillery opened in the former goods shed of St Leonard's station, becoming first single malt distillery in central Edinburgh in almost a century. Scottish Widows vacated its St Leonard's headquarters in 2020. As of April 2022, the building remains empty; prior to the move, 2,200 staff worked there.

== Geography ==
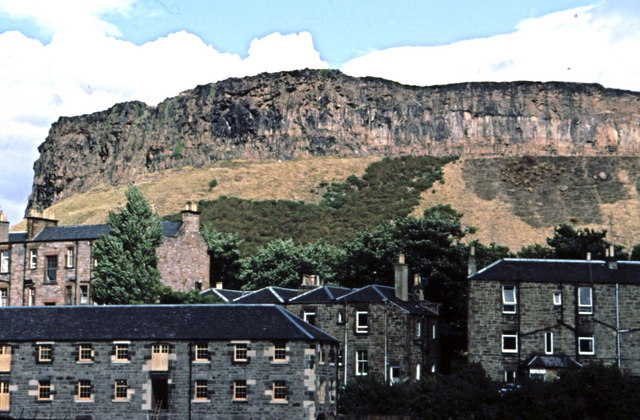
The Salisbury Crags rise above the rooftops of St Leonard's

The neighbourhood of St Leonard's is located along the western boundary of Holyrood Park and is overshadowed by the Salisbury Crags, from which it is separated by a valley. St Leonard's Hill, on the western side of this valley, is a small outcrop, one of many in the area around Edinburgh. The hill rises to 281ft (87m) above sea level. This hill affords expansive views of the park.

=== Demography ===
The census data zones that mostly cover the area of St Leonard's (Note: Canongate, Southside and Dumbiedykes – 03 and Newington and Dalkeith Road – 03, 04, 05; Newington and Dalkeith Road – 03 and 05 also contain portions of Newington and the Southside) had a combined population of 5,385 in 2020 with 1,881 dwellings at 75.2 dwellings per hectare.

As of 2020, the data zones Newington and Dalkeith Road - 04 and 05 are in the eighth decile of Scottish Index of Multiple Deprivation while Canongate, Southside and Dumbiedykes - 03 and Newington and Dalkeith Road – 03 site lower: in the sixth and fifth deciles respectively. In 2018, the mean house price in St Leonard's was £288,257: only slightly above an average of £280,643 in Edinburgh as a whole but well above the £181,457 average across Scotland. In 2018, 110 children in St Leonard's were in receipt of child benefit and the school attendance rate in 2016–2017 stood at 94 relative to 93.94 across Edinburgh.

== Governance ==
=== Local ===
In local government, St Leonard's is covered by the four-member Southside/Newington ward of the City of Edinburgh Council. (Note: The Southside/Newington ward covers St Leonard's as well as the Southside, Newington, Prestonfield, Cameron Toll, Nether Liberton, Blackford, the Grange, and Sciennes.) The current councillors are ; Tim Pogson (Labour); Steve Burgess (Green); Simita Kumar (SNP); and Pauline Flannery (Liberal Democrat). At the last council elections on 5 May 2022, the results for the ward were:

Southside/Newington - 4 seats
| Party | Candidate | FPv% | Count | | | |
| Party | Candidate | FPv% | 1 | 2 | 3 | 4 |
|---|---|---|---|---|---|---|
| Labour | Tim Pogson | 24.1% | 2,837 | | | |
| Green | Steve Burgess (incumbent) | 23.0% | 2,717 | | | |
| SNP | Simita Kumar | 19.2% | 2,260 | 2,338 | 2,557 | |
| Liberal Democrats | Pauline Flannery | 16.1% | 1,897 | 2,141 | 2,236 | 2,331 |
| Conservative | Cameron Rose (incumbent) | 17.6% | 2,077 | 2,139 | 2,146 | 2,154 |
Electorate: 24,152 Valid: 11,788 Spoilt: 96 Quota: 2,358 Turnout: 49.2%

Along with the Southside, Dumbiedykes, and the northern part of Newington Community Council. St Leonard's is covered by the Southside Community Council. For conservation purposes, parts of St Leonard's are included in the South Side Conservation Area, designated in 1975.

Prior to the 19th century, the area currently covered by Newington was part of St Cuthbert's Parish the county of Midlothian. In 1832, the Great Reform Act included St Leonard's in Edinburgh for the purposes of electing the city's MPs; however, full incorporation did not take place until 1856. At this date, St Leonard's gave its name to a new ward of the city council.

=== Parliamentary ===
In the Scottish Parliament, St Leonard's lies within the Edinburgh Central constituency, which has been represented by Angus Robertson (SNP) since the 2021 election. The constituency is part of the Lothian electoral region.

In the House of Commons, St Leonard's lies within the Edinburgh East. This seat has been represented by Tommy Sheppard (SNP) since 2015.

With the incorporation of St Leonard's into Edinburgh, the area's representation in parliament was as part of the Edinburgh constituency. At the division of Edinburgh into constituencies in 1885, St Leonard's was incorporated into the Edinburgh Central constituency. At the revision of boundaries in 1918, the area south of Holyrood Park Road was included within Edinburgh South. From 1950 to 1983, all but the northern tip of St Leonard's – which remained in Edinburgh Central – was included in Edinburgh South. From 1983 to 2005, the area – except the portion south of Holyrood Park Road – was reincluded in Edinburgh Central. Since the abolition of Edinburgh Central in 2005, the area has been covered by Edinburgh East.

== Architecture ==
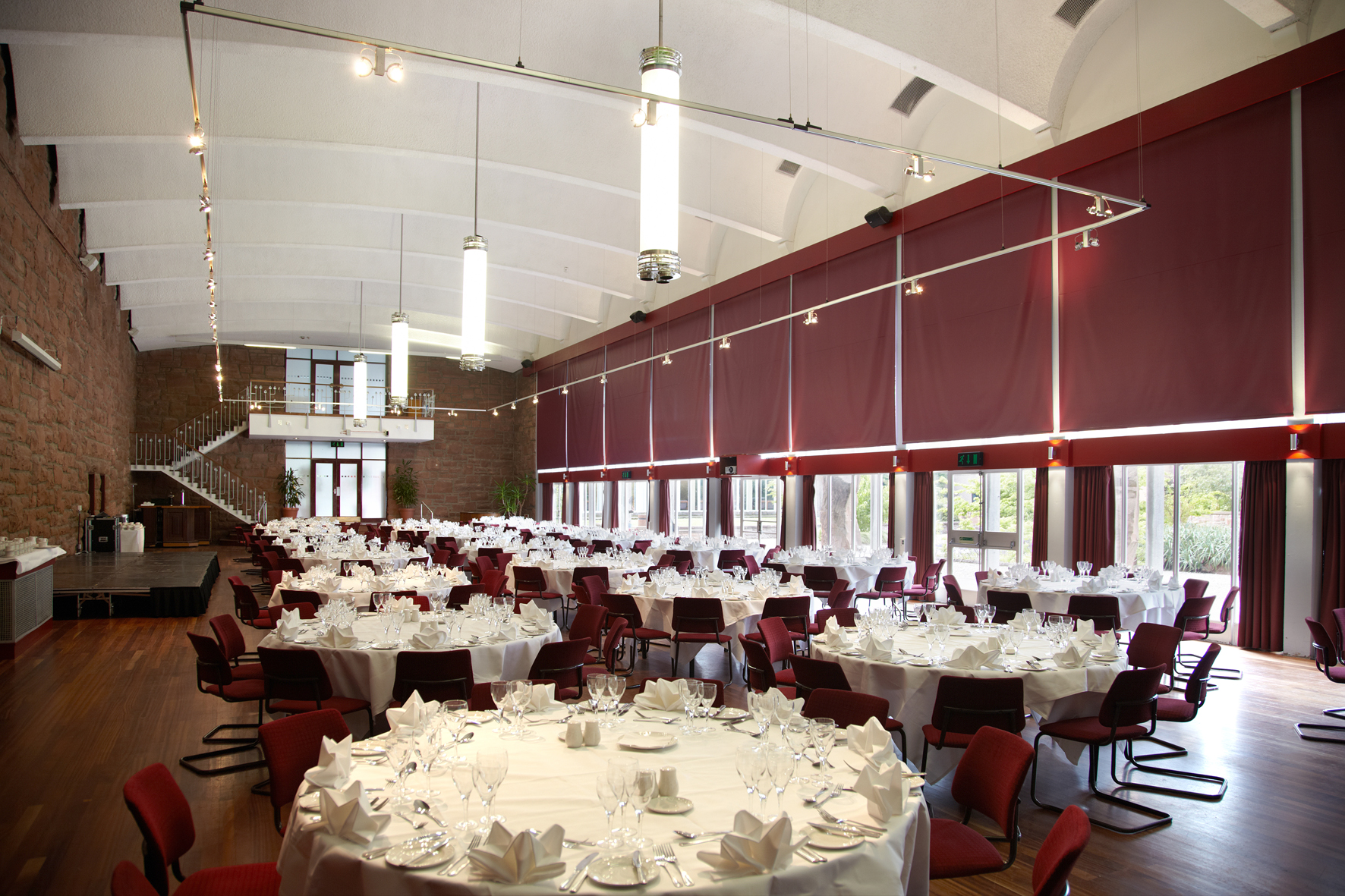
The interior of the South Hall at the University of Edinburgh's Pollock Halls site by Rowand Anderson, Kininmonth & Paul: "a key work of Scottish Modernism"

St Leonard's includes the University of Edinburgh's Pollock Halls of Residence. The oldest purpose-built blocks are the Festival style South Hall by Rowand Anderson, Kininmonth & Paul, built between 1956 and 1964. The City of Edinburgh Council's appraisal of the Southside Conservation Area describes these as "a key work of Scottish Modernism". Construction of new buildings continued into the early 1970s. Between then and the beginning of the 21st century Masson House by McLaren, Murdoch & Hamilton (1994) was the only new building constructed at the site. Since 2001, Oberlander Architects have been responsible for Chancellor's Court and John Burnett House. In 2017, the gates that once stood in Bristo Square between the McEwan Hall and Reid Concert Hall were removed to the Pollock Halls site. These were constructed by Thomas Hadden & Co. around 1896.

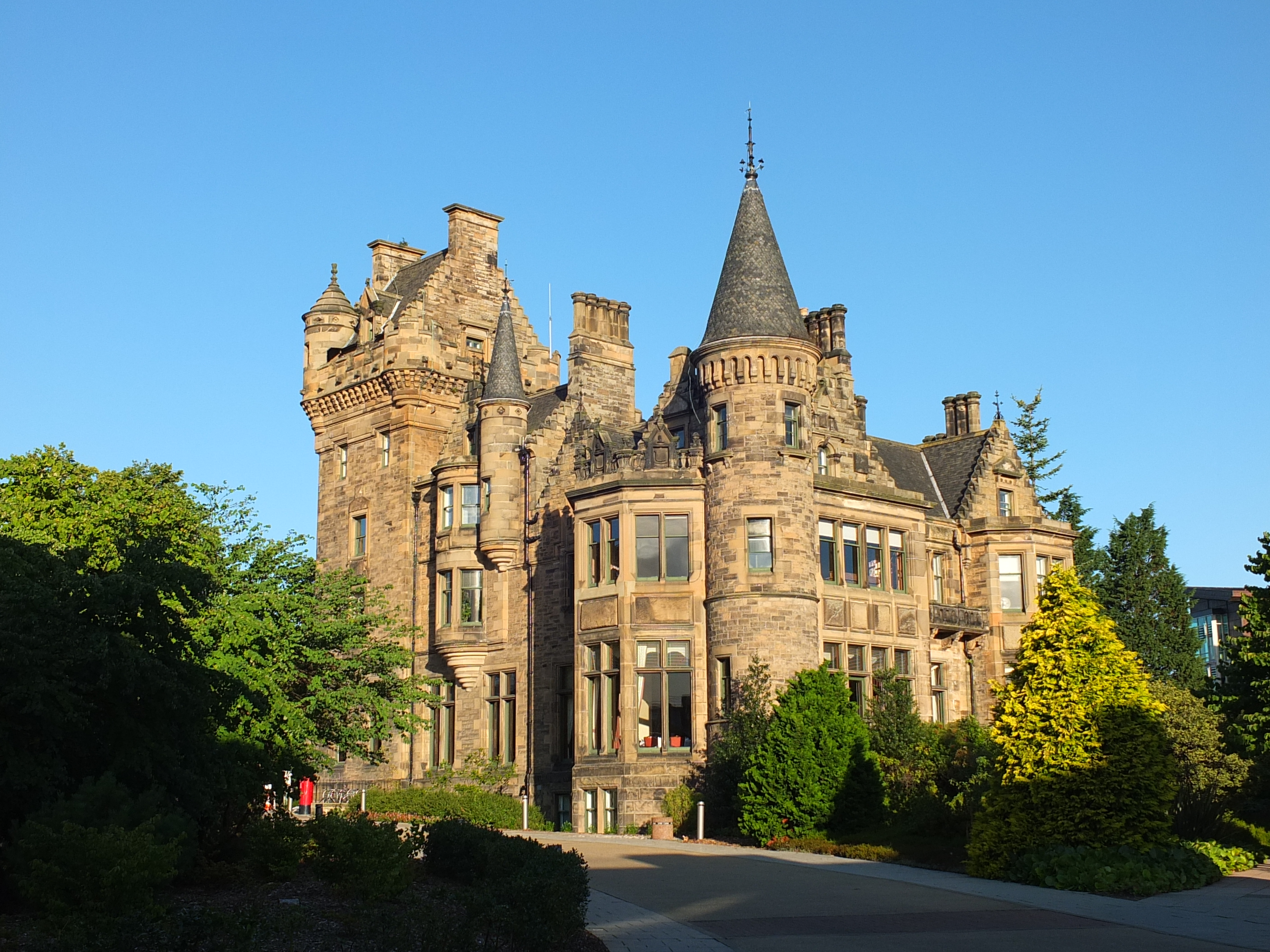
St Leonard's Hall: one of three works in St Leonard's by leading Scots baronial architect John Lessels

The Pollock Halls site incorporates three Victorian mansions. Abden House was constructed to a Jacobean design of Thomas Davies in 1855. The grounds of Abden House include a life-size bronze statue of physician Wong Fun, unveiled in 2007. Salisbury Green, initially a small mansion of around 1780, was rebuilt in the baronial style by John Lessels for William Nelson in the 1860s. Lessels designed baronial mansion, St Leonard's, for the younger Thomas Nelson soon after. The building has a heavy Arts and Crafts interior with ceilings by the firm of Thomas Bonnar. J. Brian Crossland called St Leonard's a "striking example" of the best of the Scottish baronial style. Lessels is also responsible for the Scottish Gothic design of St Margaret's and St Leonard's Catholic Church, opened in 1880 as St Leonard's Parish Church. Another prominent domestic building is Hermits and Termits, constructed in 1734 and restored by Benjamin Tindall in the early 1980s. In the 1980s and 1990s, many gap sites in St Leonard's were filled in with private housing developments, most constructed from brick and render. One example is the 1989 neo-classical block of flats of by Fraser Brown on St Leonard's Street.

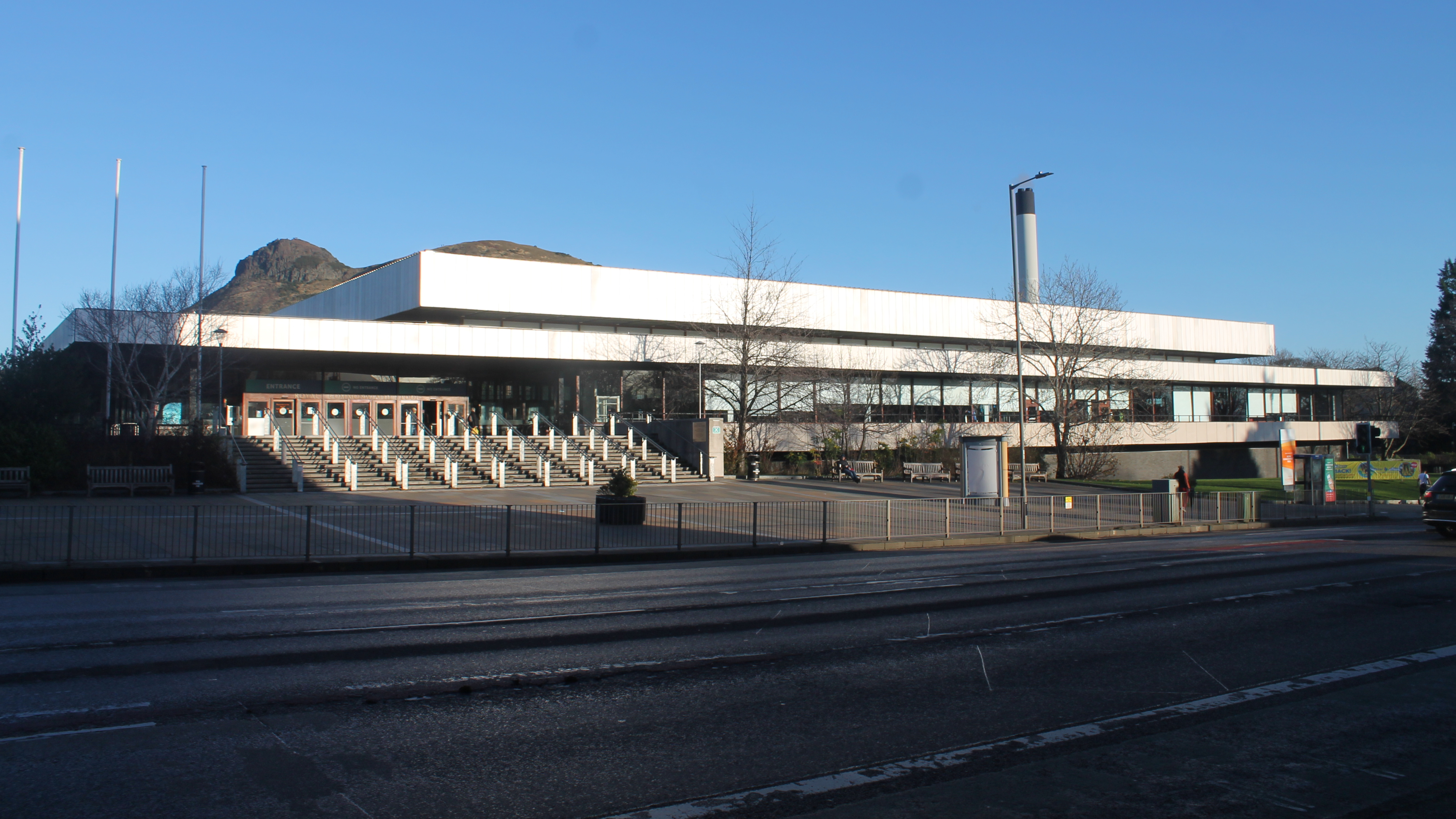
The Royal Commonwealth Pool by John Richards of Robert Matthew, Johnson-Marshall & Partners

Prominent modernist buildings include the former Scottish Widows headquarters on Dalkeith Road, constructed to a polygonal, glass-fronted design by Basil Spence, Golver & Ferguson and opened in 1976. Sylvia Crowe served as landscape consultant. Slightly to the south on Dalkeith Road stands the Royal Commonwealth Pool, another modernist building, designed in 1967 by John Richards of Robert Matthew, Johnson-Marshall & Partners. The exterior is over three levels with long facias. Other public buildings include the Scottish Renaissance-style former James Clark Technical School by J. A. Carfrae (1913) at St Leonard's Crag and the post-modernist St Leonard's Police Station by Lothian Region Architects (1989).

Ex-industrial buildings include the former bonds of J. & G. Stewart whisky on Holyrood Park Road of 1902, which incorporates a large pediment, and the three-storey former St Leonard's station. Both have now been converted to residential and commercial use.

== Amenities ==
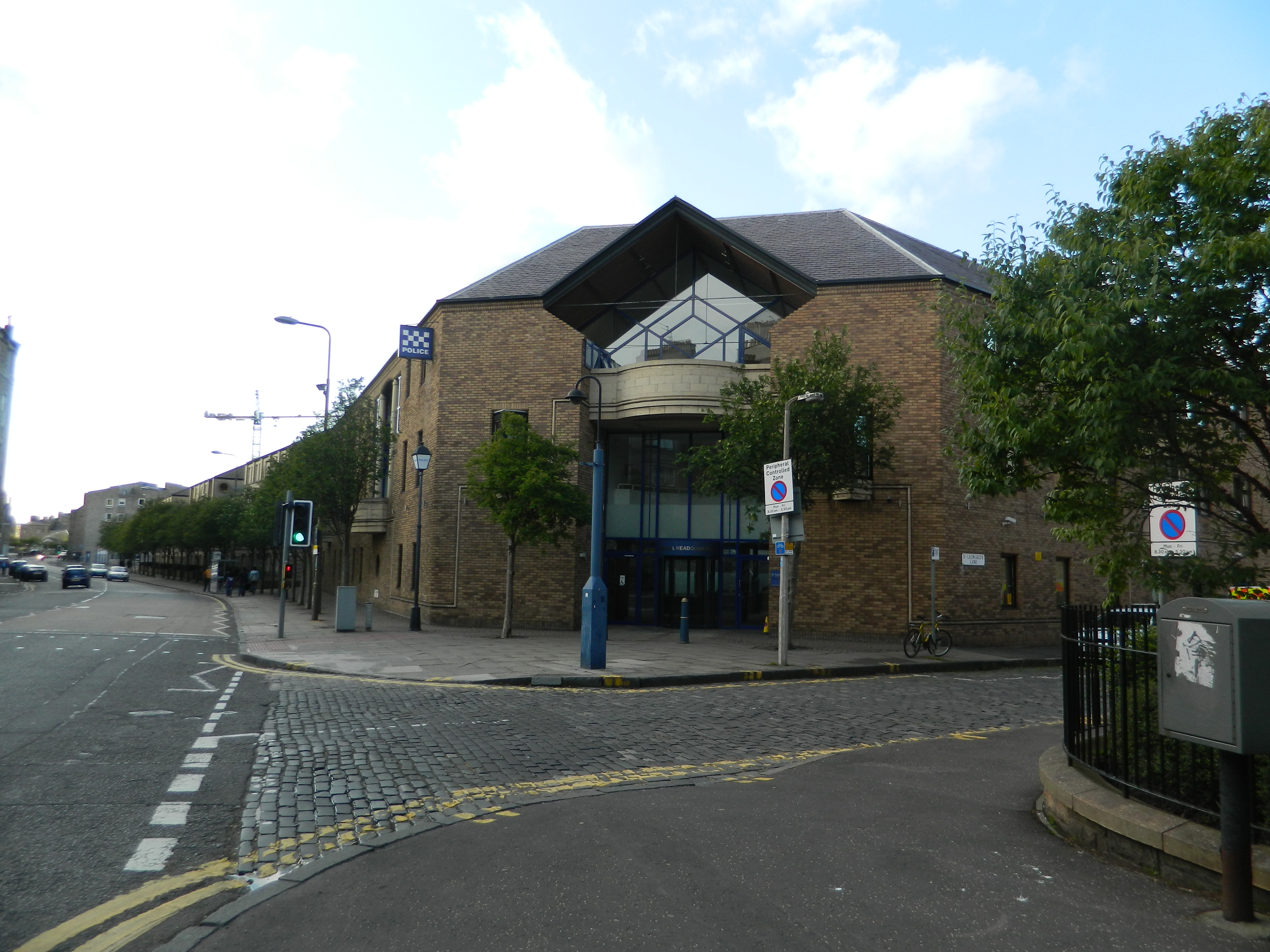
St Leonard's Police Station, opened 1990

The St Leonards Medical Centre is located nearby on the Pleasance in the Southside. St Leonard's is the site of the Royal Commonwealth Pool: a public baths incorporating an Olympic-size swimming pool. Community spaces located nearby in the Southside include the Greyfriars Charteris Centre; the Nelson Hall; and the Crags sports centre.

The only church in St Leonard's is St Margaret's and St Leonard's Catholic Church: a congregation of the Society of St Pius X. There is a police station on St Leonard's Street. The area is almost entirely residential; there are, however, shops along the western side of St Leonard's Street, in the Southside.

=== Transport ===
The Lothian Buses serves St Leonard's with The number 14 (Muirhouse–Greendykes) serves St Leonard's Street and Dalkeith Road south of West Richmond Street. Dalkeith Road south of East Preston Street is served by the 2 (Gyle Centre–The Jewel), the 30 (Clovenstone–Musselburgh), and the 33 (Wester Hailes–Millerhill).

=== Education ===
St Leonard's is divided between the non-denominational primary school catchment areas of Preston Street Primary School in Newington and Royal Mile Primary School in the Canongate. Both schools feed into James Gillespie's High School in Marchmont. In denominational state schools, St Leonard's is divided between the catchment areas of St Peter's Roman Catholic Primary School in Morningside and St Mary's Primary School in Broughton. Both schools feed into St Thomas of Aquin's High School in Lauriston.

There is student accommodation of the University of Edinburgh at Hermit's Croft, Salisbury Court, and across the Pollock Halls site. The Confucius Institute of Edinburgh, founded in 2006, is located within the Pollock Halls site at Abden House.

== Notable residents ==
In 1807, Hermits and Termits was leased to Robert Scott, an engraver, and his wife Alice. The Scotts raised two sons here who would go on to become prominent artists: the history painter David Scott and William Bell Scott, who was associated with the Pre-Raphaelite Brotherhood. A contemporary of the Scotts in St Leonard's was the physician Andrew Duncan. The author S. R. Crockett lodged in St Leonard's as student.

== Cultural depictions ==
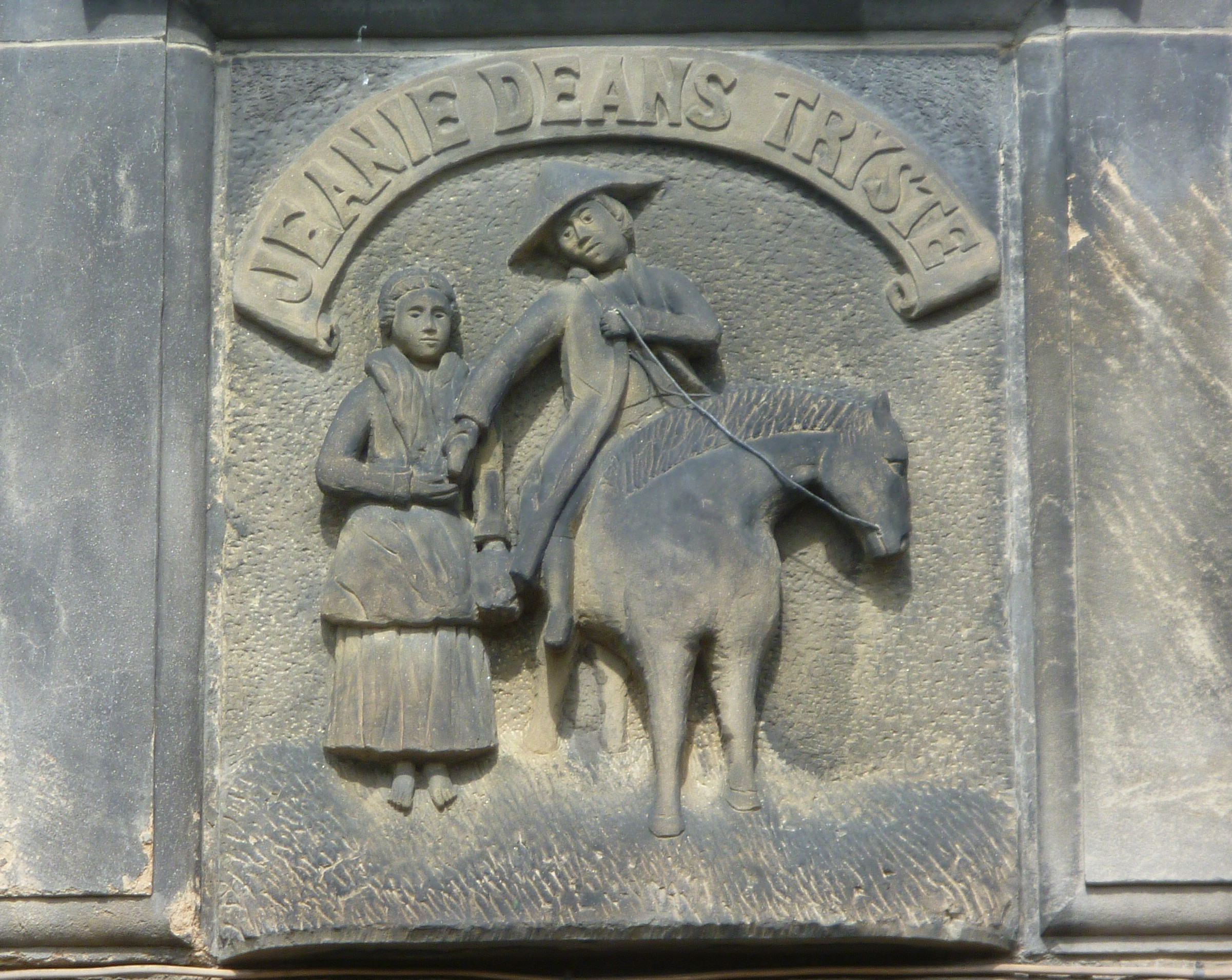
Jeanie Deans' tryst, depicted in a stone plaque on a 19th-century tenement

In fiction, St Leonard's Hill was the site of David Deans' house in Walter Scott's The Heart of Midlothian. In the novel, Deans' daughter Jeanie has a nocturnal tryst with George Robertson at Nicol Mushet's cairn on the opposite side of Holyrood Park. The character's connection to the area was reflected in the name of Jeanie Deans' Cottage on St Leonard's Bank, demolished in 1965. The tryst also gave its name to a pub on St Leonard's Hill. The late-19th century tenement in which the pub was located incorporated a stone relief plaque depicting the tryst.

St Leonard's Police Station is the base of John Rebus: protagonist of a series of detective novels by Ian Rankin. S. R. Crockett's 1896 novel Cleg Kelly includes many scenes set around the St Leonard's area.
