= Salisbury Green =

Eighteenth-century house in Edinburgh

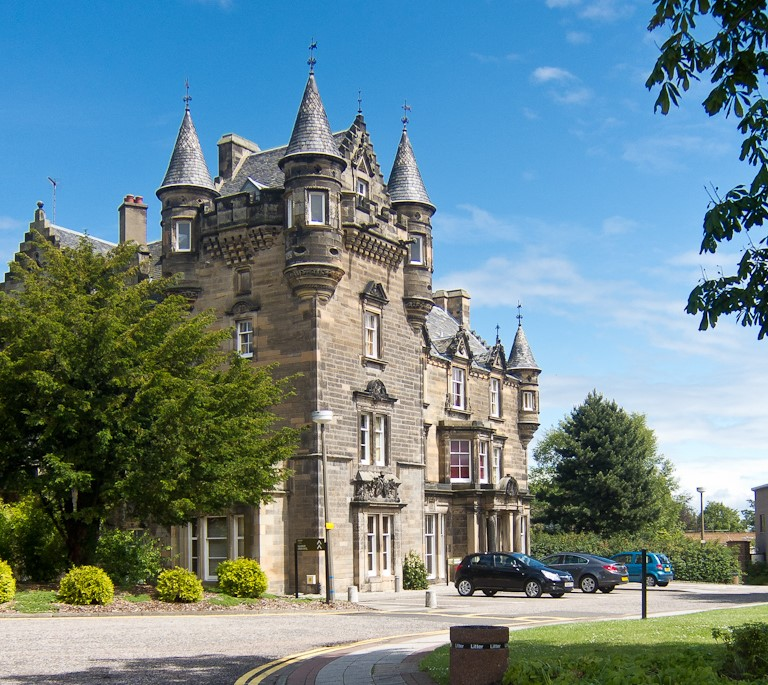
- The front of Salisbury Green

General information
- Architectural style: Scottish baronial
- Location: Edinburgh, Scotland
- Coordinates: 55.93816°N 3.17121°W
- Completed: 1780
- Owner: University of Edinburgh

Design and construction
- Architects: Alexander Scott; John Lessels

Listed Building – Category A
- Designated: 14 December 1970
- Reference no.: LB28620

Salisbury Green is an eighteenth-century house, on the Pollock Halls of Residence site of the University of Edinburgh.

Originally built around 1780 by Alexander Scott, it is one of the two original buildings on site, along with St Leonard's Hall.

From 1820, the house was extended repeatedly. In 1860-67 the architect John Lessels remodelled in house in baronial style, for the publisher William Nelson (1816–1887), of the Thomas Nelson publishing company.

The university acquired the building after World War II and it was extended again in 1979. Several of its public rooms have been restored including the bow-fronted drawing room to the east, the Red Room with ebony fittings and the oak-panelled billiard room. Its interior includes rich painting by Charles Frechou. In 2006, Salisbury Green was given a thorough refurbishment, and operated by the university as the Scott Hotel. It was rebranded in 2018, and as of 2025 is trading as The Scott Hotel. It no longer houses students.

The building (including its boundary walls) has been category A listed since December 1970.
