= Pollock Halls of Residence =

Main halls of residence for students at the University of Edinburgh

Coordinates: 55°56′21.65″N 3°10′11.03″W

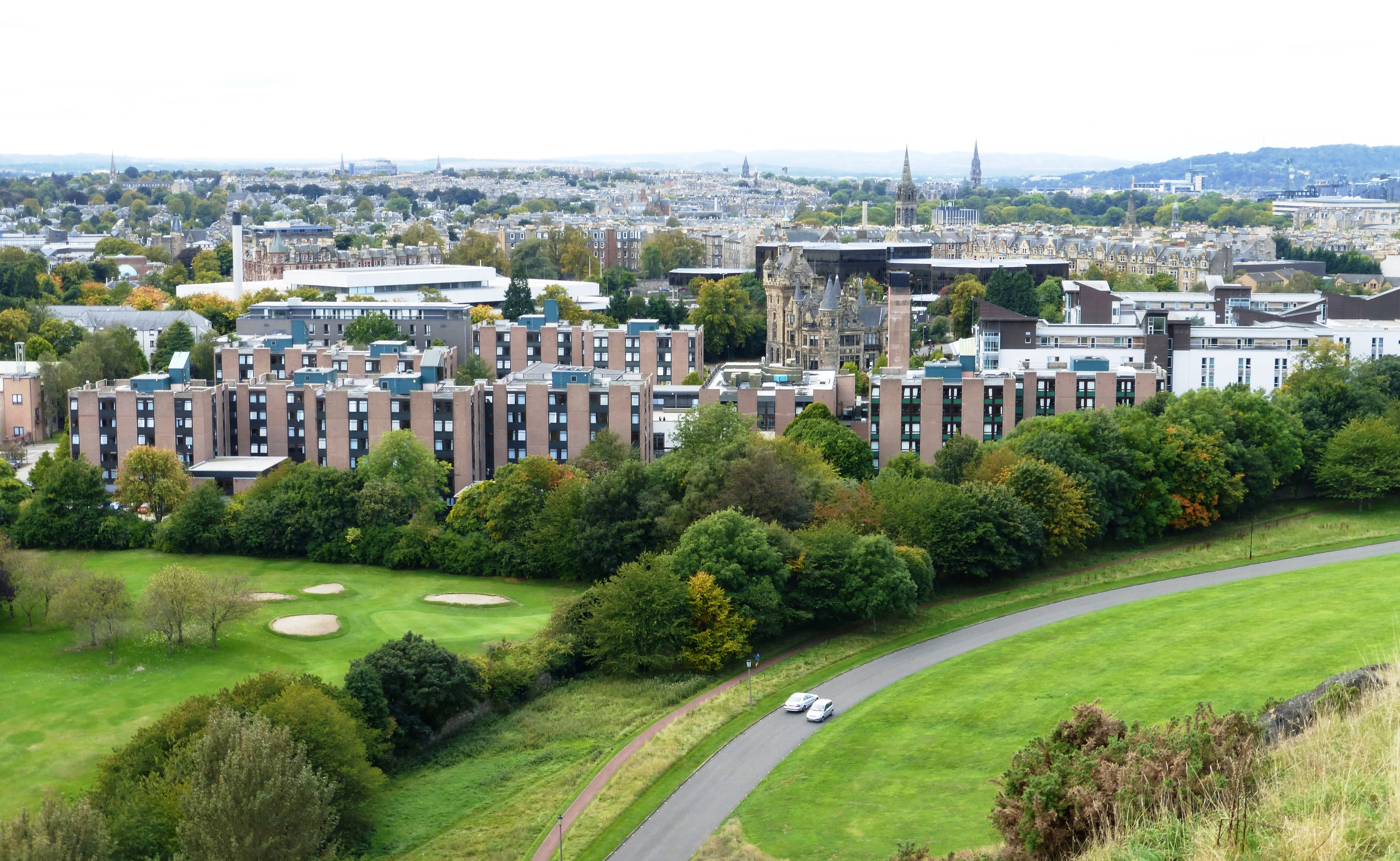
Pollock Halls of Residence

Pollock Halls of Residence is the largest halls of residence for the University of Edinburgh, located in St Leonard's, Edinburgh, Scotland, near the foot of Arthur's Seat. The complex of buildings houses more than 2,000 undergraduate students during term time, and is available to the public as bed and breakfast-style accommodation outside of the teaching term. While some of the buildings date from the 19th century, the majority of Pollock Halls dates from the 1960s and early 2000s. Pollock Halls are located on the edge of Holyrood Park, 1 1/4 miles (2.0 km) southeast of the centre of Edinburgh, and 3/4 mile (1.2 km) from the university's central area around George Square.

== History ==
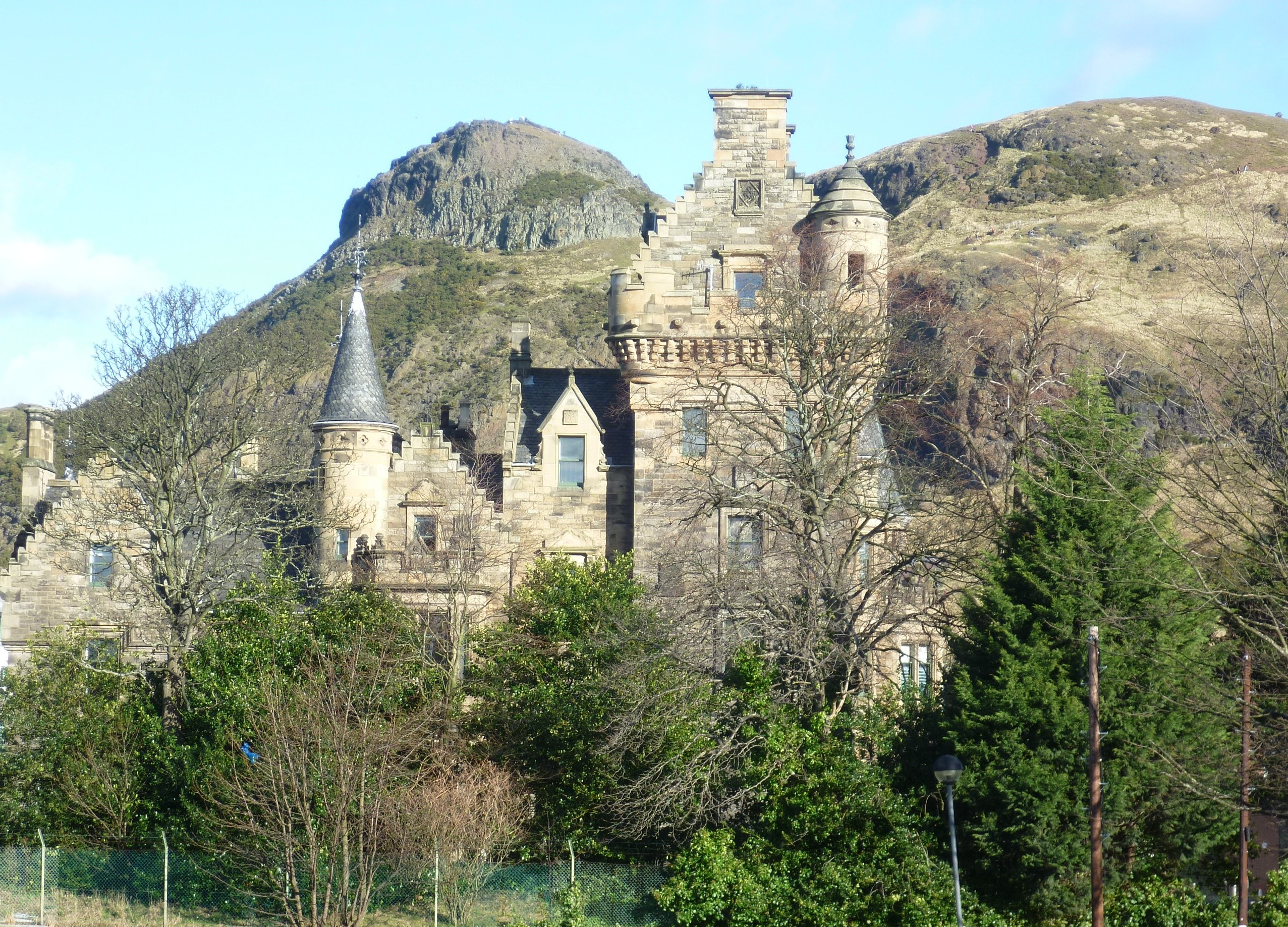
St. Leonard's Hall and Arthur's Seat

The two original buildings on site were St Leonard's Hall and Salisbury Green, which were built in the 19th century. Shortly after World War II, Sir Donald Pollock (Rector of the University from 1939 to 1945) gifted the site to the University of Edinburgh and Pollock Halls of Residence came into being.

In the 1960s, a programme was begun to build more modern halls. The first of these was Holland House, which was designed by Sir William Kininmonth (1904–1988); followed shortly by its sister house, Fraser House.

In 1970, the halls of residence played host to the athletes competing at the 1970 British Commonwealth Games and provided accommodation and dining facilities for the event. A new catering block was constructed in addition to an athletes' shopping centre, post office and recreation spaces.

In the early 1990s, Holland House and Fraser House began to be run together, and are simply known these days as Holland House.

In the 1960s six system-built tower blocks were added, named in honour of former University Principals: Baird, Ewing, Lee, Turner, Brewster (since demolished) and Grant. At the same time, a Refectory block was opened. This was later named the John McIntyre Conference Centre after the first Senior Warden of the complex, who also acted for a time as a Principal of the University.

The (at the time) largest hall, Cowan House, was opened in 1973 replacing a hall of the same name which was demolished to make way for the regeneration of George Square. It was demolished in 2001.

A further hall, Masson House, was added in the early 1990s. The original Masson Hall–the university's first 'proper' accommodation for female students–had been next to Cowan in George Square, but this was replaced by a Victorian house on South Lauder Road, which was extended for the purpose in 1966, and later sold.

In 2001 and 2002, Cowan House and Brewster House were demolished to make way for the new Chancellors Court development, which opened in 2003 and is now the largest on the site.

== Current houses ==
These days, the complex houses over 2,000 students on full board. Pollock Halls of Residence are available to members of the public on a bed and breakfast basis during the vacation periods of the University of Edinburgh.

The Houses currently in Pollock Halls are:

=== Baird House ===
Baird House is a five-storey tower block which was built in the 1960s. It houses 167 students and one warden. Named after George Husband Baird, Principal of the University from 1793 to 1840.

=== Chancellor's Court ===
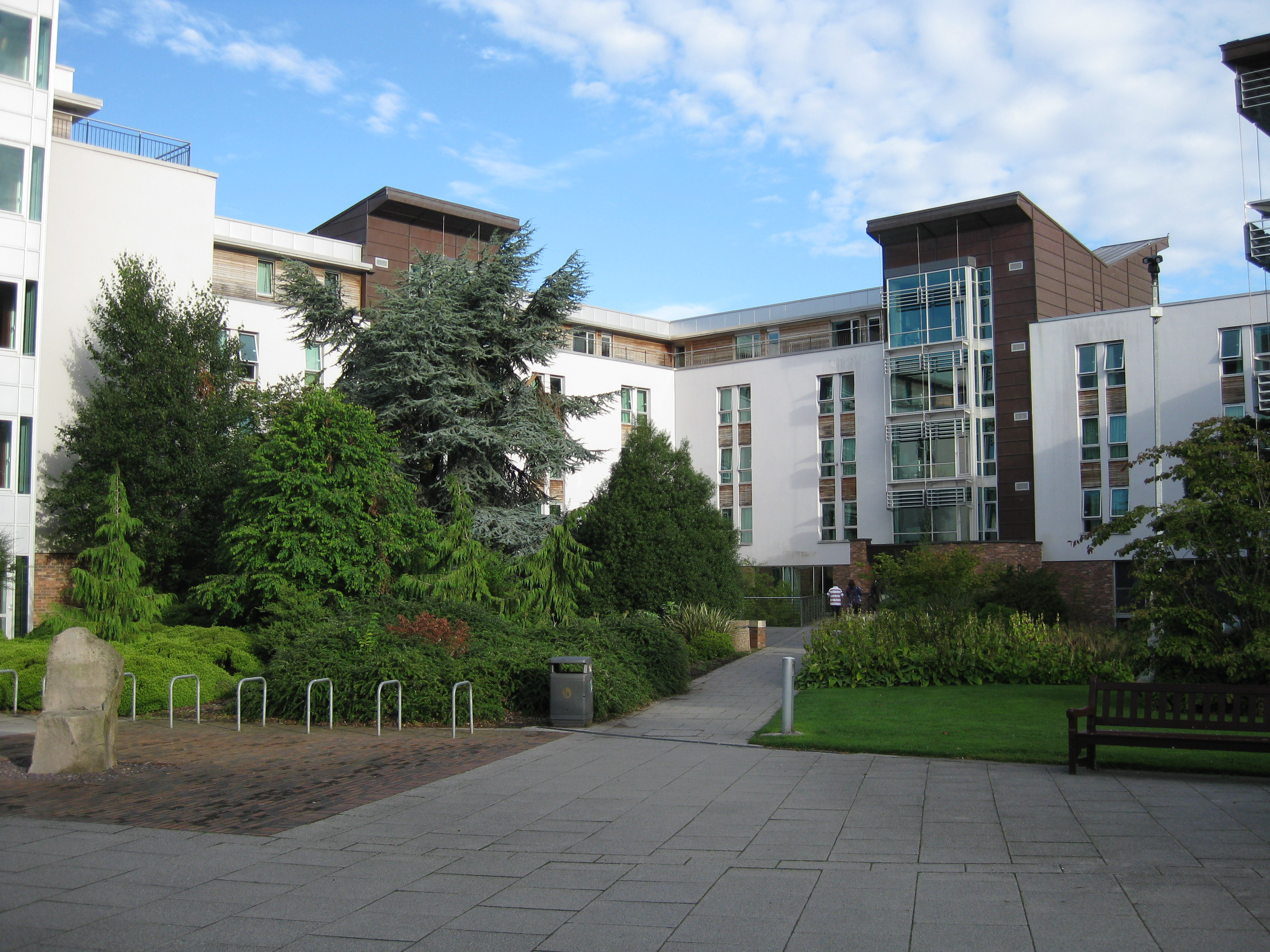
Chancellor's Court

Chancellor's Court was built on the land previously occupied by Cowan House and Brewster House. It was designed by Oberlanders Architects and built by construction company Balfour Beatty. Its construction began in 2001 when Cowan House was demolished, with the first phase opening in 2003. The final phase of the development was completed in 2004. Chancellor's Court has 526 bedrooms and three Wardens flats.

Several protests were held during construction against Balfour Beatty, who were at the time (2001) involved in the controversial Ilisu dam project. One of the protests was led by Mark Thomas, who helped the Edinburgh University People and Planet group organise a 'sit in' where students blocked the entrance to the building site. After these and other protests, Balfour Beatty withdrew their support for the Ilisu dam project. Chancellor's Court is named after the former Chancellor of the University of Edinburgh, the Duke of Edinburgh.

=== Ewing House ===
Ewing House is a five-storey tower block which was built in the 1960s and has 157 rooms. It was named after Sir Alfred James Ewing, Principal of the University of Edinburgh from 1916 to 1929.

=== Grant House ===
Grant House is a six-storey tower block, which was opened in 1967, and has been used as a student hall of residence continually ever since. These days it houses 195 students in single study bedrooms. It also contains two flats for the live-in Wardens. It was named after Sir Alexander Grant (1826–1884), Principal of the University from 1868 to 1885.

=== Holland House ===
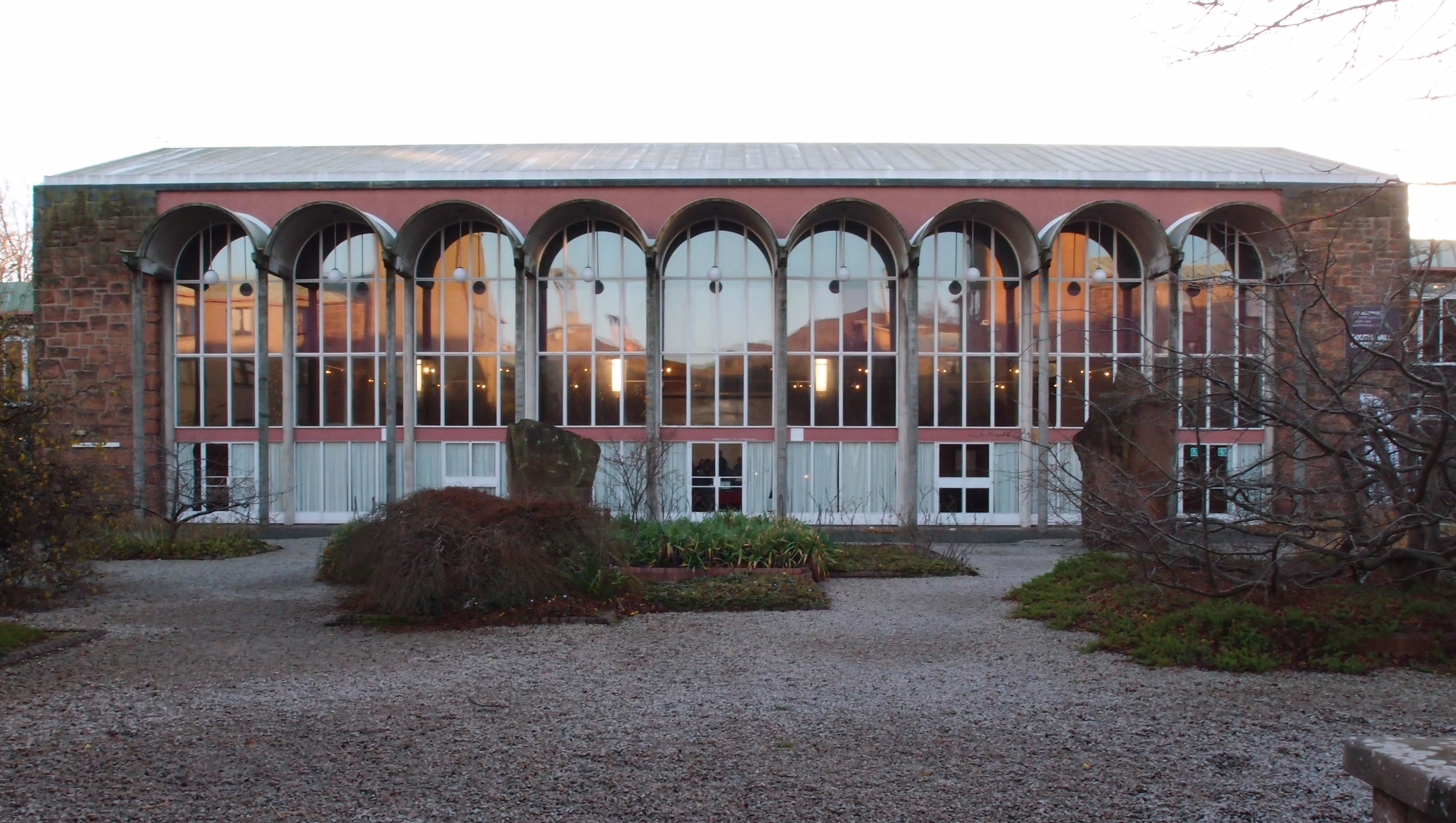
South Hall, part of the Holland House complex

Holland House was opened in 1959, followed shortly after by its sister house, Fraser House (not to be confused with Fraser Court, a block of University flats immediately adjacent to Pollock Halls, which is still in operation). In the early 1990s, Holland House and Fraser House were merged and are today run as one single house called Holland House, with four blocks (named A to D). There is also a small annexe which contains two self-catering flats used by postgraduates and mature students. Holland House was named after Sir Thomas Henry Holland, Principal of the University from 1929 to 1944.

=== Lee House ===
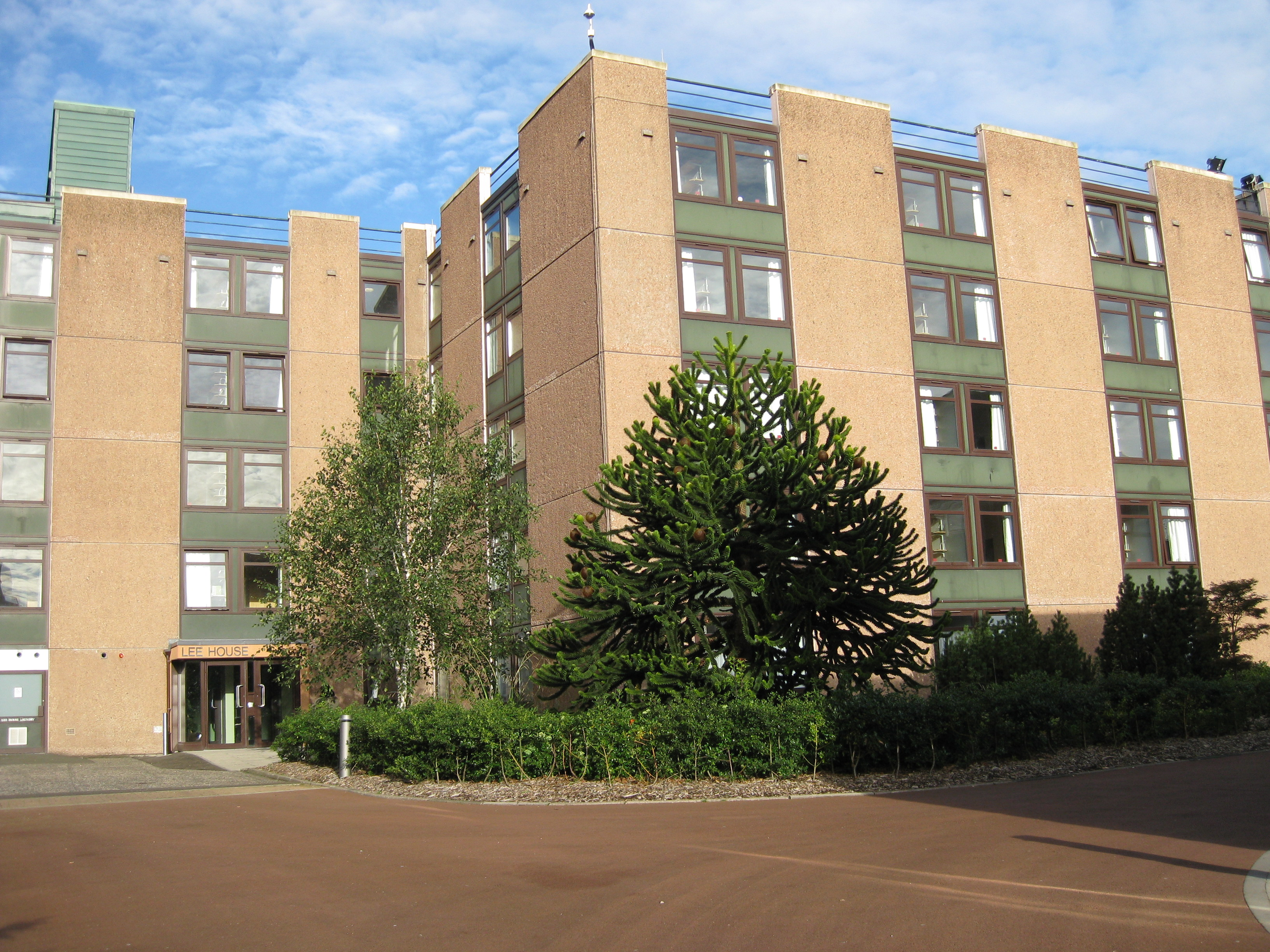
Lee House

Lee House is a five-storey tower block which was built in the 1960s. It was named after John Lee, Principal of the University from 1840 to 1859. Former British prime minister Gordon Brown spent his first year studying at the university at Lee House.

=== Turner House ===
Turner House is a seven-storey tower block which was built in the 1960s. It was named after Sir William Turner, Principal of the University from 1903 to 1916. It can hold up to 203 residents, with the majority of rooms being single study rooms, with shared toilets and showers, and two double sized rooms on the 1st and 5th floor for house wardens.

=== John Burnett House ===
Having been completed in July 2009, John Burnett House lies on the west side of Pollock Halls, between Lee House and Masson House. The five-storey building can hold 150 students in both single and shared rooms, both of which can have shared or en-suite facilities. It is named after John Burnett, a British botanist and mycologist, who served as the principal and vice chancellor of Edinburgh University from 1979 to 1987.

== Past Houses ==
=== Brewster House ===
Brewster House was a four-storey tower block which was built in the 1960s and used to house undergraduate students (and tourists during summers) for the length of its use. It was demolished in summer 2002, and the land it stood on was used for the new Chancellors Court building. It was named after Sir David Brewster, Principal of the University from 1859 to 1868.

=== Cowan House ===
Cowan House was opened following a £15,000 donation to the University from Thomas Cowan, a retired ship owner in Leith, in recognition of students assistance in the 1926 General Strike. The house originally housed 125 male students in a row of houses on the south side of George Square, where the Main Library now stands. The house was closed and a new house with the same name was built in Pollock Halls in 1973. The new house comprised six three-storey blocks (named A up to F). Undergraduate students were housed in Blocks A, B, C and F with Postgraduates with families being housed in Block D and single Postgraduates in Block E. It was demolished in the summer of 2001 and the land was used for the new Chancellors Court development.

=== Fraser House ===
See also Holland House, above. Not to be confused with Fraser Court

The building that used to be called Fraser House still exists, but has been merged with Holland House. Fraser House was named after Sir John Fraser, surgeon and Principal of the University from 1944 to 1948.

== Other buildings on site ==
The other buildings on-site at Pollock Halls are available for use as conference, meeting, dining and function rooms throughout the entire year. Edinburgh First is the commercial arm of the Accommodation Services within the University and is the main point of contact for the hire of these buildings.

=== John McIntyre Conference Centre ===
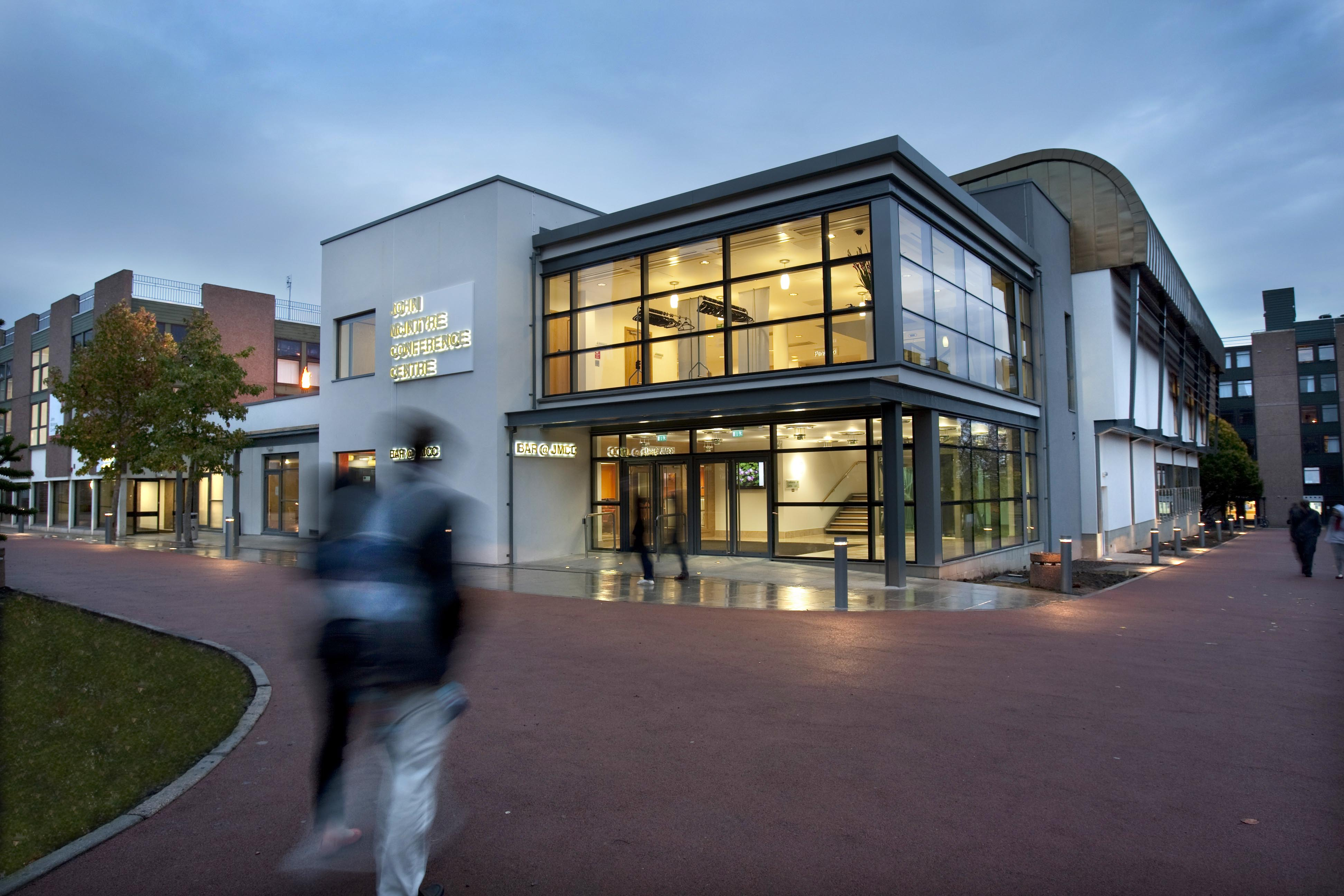
The John McIntyre Conference Centre

The John McIntyre Conference Centre comprises a refectory, shop and upstairs bar. The bar was previously known as the 'John McIntyre Centre Bar', but was refurbished and rebranded as 'Centro' in 2004. The building underwent an extensive and comprehensive refurbishment in 2009, and was subsequently renamed the John McIntyre Conference Centre, affectionately referred to as the JMCC. It is the university's premier conference center for both academic and non-academic events.

=== Reception Centre ===
This was opened in 1999 and is where the administrative functions are based; the security team also have their office here.

=== St Leonard's Hall ===
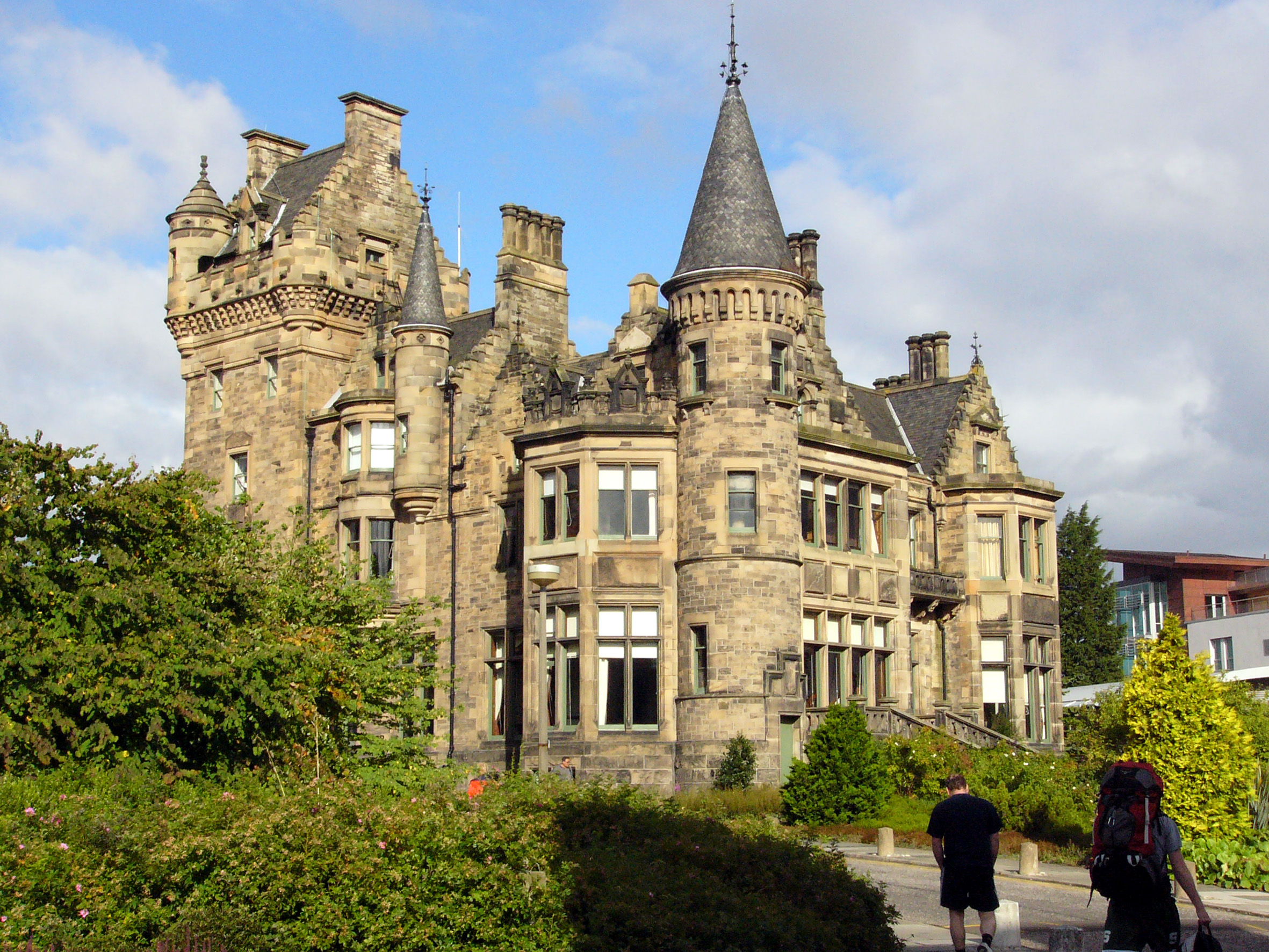
St Leonard's Hall

Along with Salisbury Green, St Leonard's Hall is one of the original buildings on the Pollock Halls site. Originally designed by John Lessels for the Thomas Nelson family of publishers, today St Leonard's Hall houses the administrative offices of the university's Accommodation Services, as well as suites which are used for conferences and other functions.

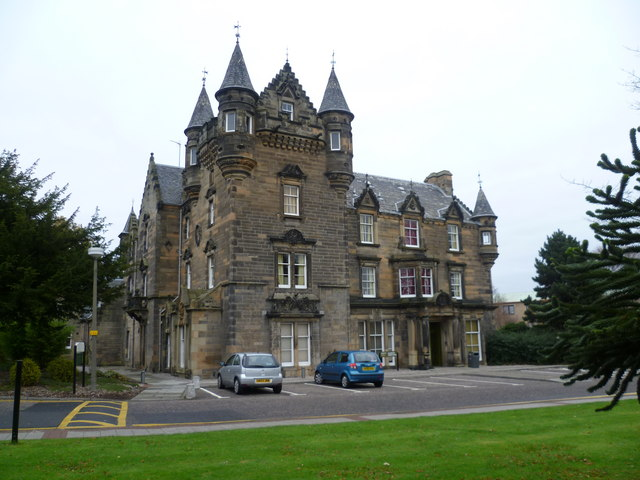
Salisbury Green

=== The Scott Hotel ===
The Scott Hotel (formerly Salisbury Green) was one of the two original buildings on site, along with St Leonard's Hall. It was originally built around 1780 by Alexander Scott, and was extended repeatedly.

The building was acquired by the University after World War II and extended again in 1979. In 2006, the building was refurbished and renamed, and now operates as a hotel. It no longer houses students.

== The Scholar Hotel (formerly Masson House) ==
Masson House is a modern four-storey hall of residence, which can hold 133 people in mostly single en-suite double-bedded rooms. It was built in the 1990s and underwent extensive refurbishment in 2016. As of 2021, Masson House is not available as student accommodation, but used as a year-round three-star hotel for business travelers and conference attendees. The university had previously been criticised for its usage of Masson House, given a shortage in student accommodation. It is named after 19th-century historian David Masson, who also lent his name to Masson Hall, the university's first hall of residence for women.

== See also ==
- List of Category A listed buildings in Edinburgh
- List of post-war Category A listed buildings in Scotland
