= St Leonards railway station (Scotland) =

Former railway station in Scotland

Coordinates: 55.9426°N 3.1757°W

St Leonards
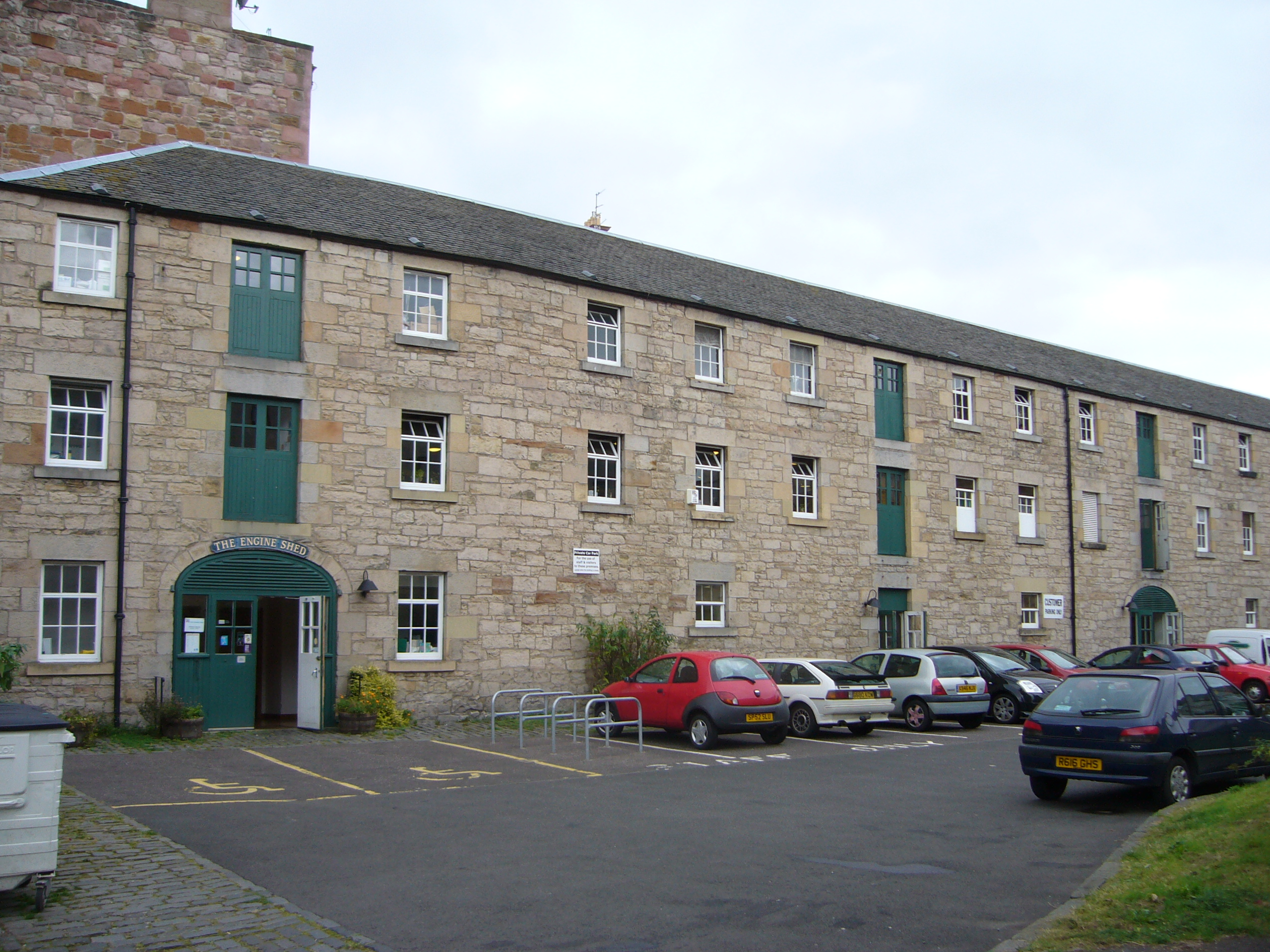
- Surviving goods shed

General information
- Location: Edinburgh, City of Edinburgh; Scotland

Other information
- Status: Disused

History
- Original company: Edinburgh and Dalkeith Railway
- Pre-grouping: North British Railway
- Post-grouping: London and North Eastern Railway

Key dates
- 2 June 1832: Opened
- 1846: Closed
- 1 June 1860: Reopened
- 30 September 1860: Closed to passengers - site reused as a goods depot
- 1968: Goods depot closed
Location
- Location within the City of Edinburgh council area

St. Leonards railway station is a closed railway station in St Leonard's, Edinburgh, on the Edinburgh and Dalkeith Railway. It was Edinburgh's first railway station. The railway was built in 1831 to transport coal from the mining towns south of the city; and the following year opened passenger services. St. Leonards was the terminus for the south of the city and was named after the nearby region.

Passenger services ceased in 1846, when the North British Railway opened a station at North Bridge which later developed into Waverley station. Services from Dalkeith were re-routed via Portobello. The station reopened briefly between 1 June 1860 and 30 September 1860 when a service was temporarily re-introduced from St. Leonard's to Dalkeith, Portobello and Leith, but it closed again within a few months. The railhead continued to see heavy use in its original intended role as a coal yard until 1968.

Both the coal depot and part of the railway line have been redeveloped as housing. The goods shed is the only surviving building; it has been designated a Category B listed building by Historic Environment Scotland. In 2019 it was converted into a whisky and gin distillery, operated by Holyrood distillery. The remaining trackbed is now a footpath and cycle path, forming part of the National Cycle Network Route 1.

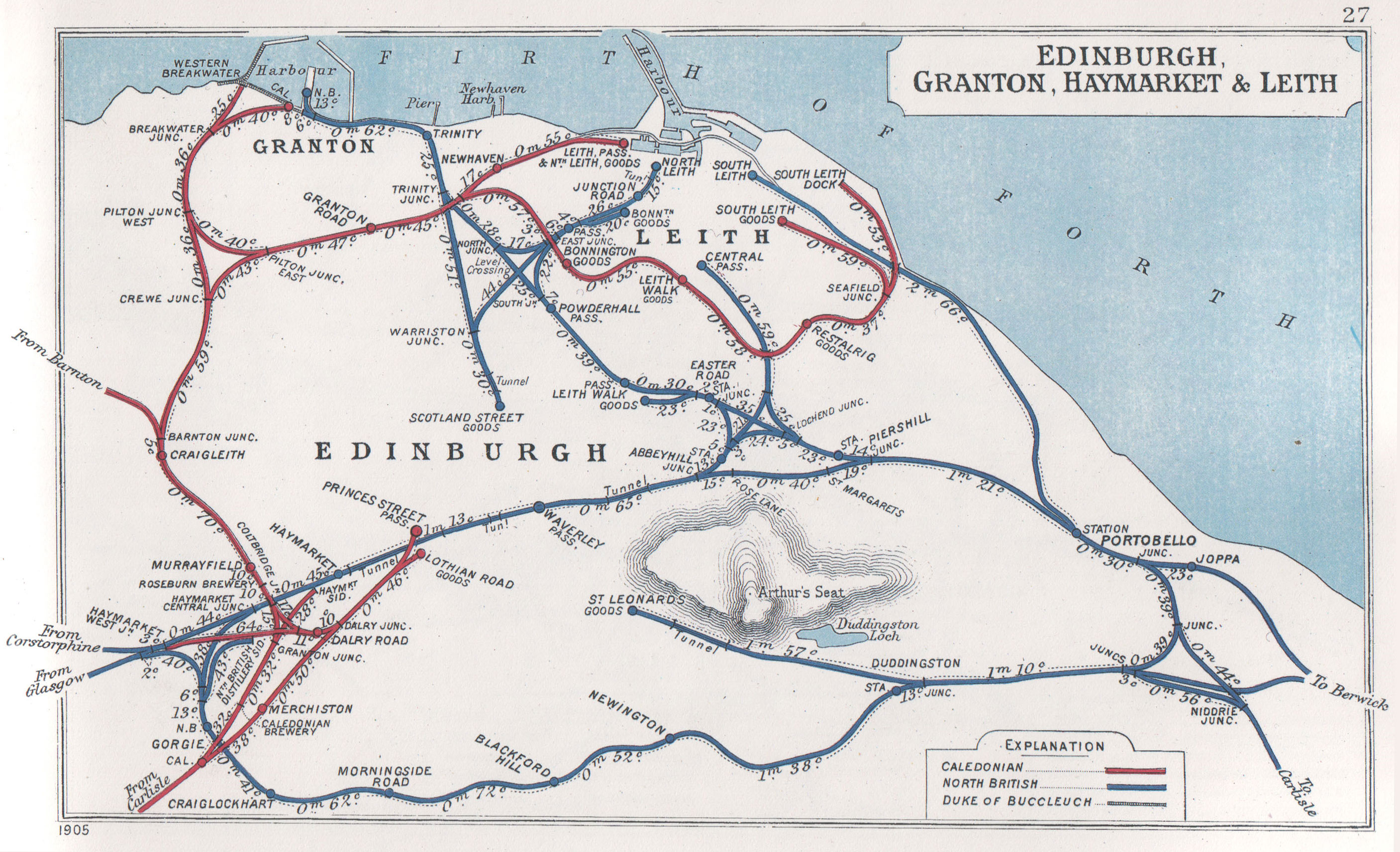
A 1905 Railway Clearing House diagram of Edinburgh railways, showing the location of St Leonards railway station

== See also ==
- Innocent Railway
