= Holyrood distillery =

Whisky and gin distillery in Edinburgh, Scotland

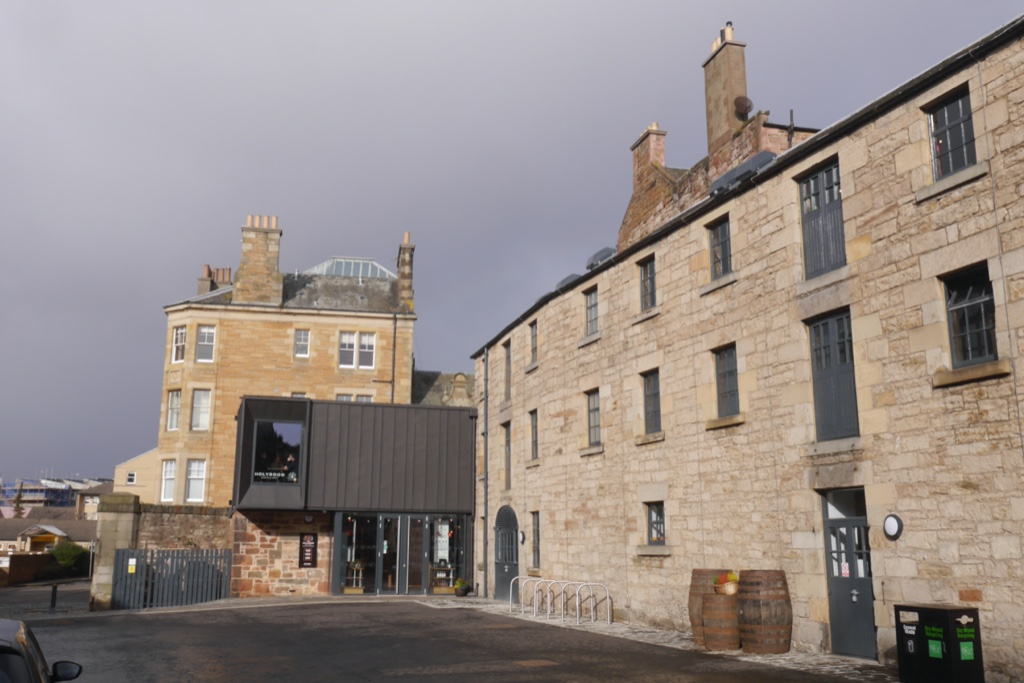

Region: Lowland
- Location: Edinburgh, Scotland
- Coordinates: 55.9432°N 3.1776°W
- Founded: 2019; 7 years ago
- Founder: Rob Carpenter; Kelly Carpenter; David Robertson
- Architect: 7N Architects
- Status: Operational
- No. of stills: 1 wash still 1 spirit still
- Capacity: 53,000 L
- Website: holyrooddistillery.co.uk

Listed Building – Category B
- Official name: St Leonard's Lane, St Leonard's Station Including Outbuilding at Gate and Gatepiers
- Designated: 30 June 1988
- Reference no.: LB29731

Holyrood distillery is a distillery in Edinburgh, Scotland. It opened in 2019 as the first new distillery in the city in nearly one hundred years. The distillery building was once the Goods shed building of St Leonards railway station.

The company produces Scotch whisky and gin. Whisky production has experimented with heirloom varieties of barley.

== History ==
The distillery was founded by couple Rob and Kelly Carpenter, and David Robertson. The Carpenters had previously founded a branch of the Scotch Malt Whisky Society in Canada; Robertson had previously worked for Macallan.

The company's bid to take over the lease of the council-owned St. Leonard's Engine Shed was approved by City of Edinburgh Council in 2015, and planning permission for conversion into a distillery was granted the following year. Construction on the site began in 2018, after the company raised £5.8 million in funding from the Scottish National Investment Bank and private investors.

In 2019, the distillery opened to the public for tours.

The distillery ran a week of free-of-charge tours for its fifth anniversary in July 2024. Later that year, the distillery released an exclusive whisky for train company Lumo, launched at Edinburgh Waverley railway station.

== Products ==
Holyrood Distillery released its first single malt whisky, Arrival, in October 2023. The name was a reference to the distillery building's previous role as a train station, and the bottle was designed to resemble a beer bottle, inspired by a local glassworks. The first bottle of Arrival was auctioned by the Worshipful Company of Distillers in aid of a youth charity.

The distillery then released a 'founding series' of three single malts: Embra, a peated whisky; Ambir, made with specialty malts, and Pitch, made with speciality yeast. A limited edition series of expressions, Re-Rack, was launched in 2025, which were themed around different casks.

The distillery's gin brand is Height of Arrows, named after what the distillery claimed was a former Scottish Gaelic name for Arthur's Seat, Àrd-Na-Said. The shape of the bottle was redesigned in 2024 to reflect the silhouette of the hill's peak. The gin uses only one botanical, juniper, and is flavoured with Isle of Skye sea salt and beeswax.

The distillery trialled the recipe for local visitors throughout the summer of 2021, and officially released the gin that September. Two variations, named Bright and Heavy, were released in 2022; Bright used three times the amount of juniper as the original gin, and Heavy used heavily roasted juniper. The original Height of Arrows was listed in Sainsbury's supermarkets in 2025.

First launched in 2022, 'Strong Waters' is an ongoing series of new make bottlings. The first releases were made from heritage barley varietals Golden Promise and Chevalier. Subsequent new make releases used international yeasts, including sake yeast and Mexican lager yeast.

== Reception and awards ==
In May 2023, Holyrood was voted the fourth best gin distillery in the UK by the South Western Railway. In 2025, the distillery was named ‘Distiller of the Year’ at the World Whiskies Awards in London.

== See also ==
- Scotch whisky
- Lowland single malts
