= Alexander Scott (architect) =

British architect

- Born: 25 August 1920
- Died: 12 January 2005 (aged 84); Glasgow, Scotland
- Occupation: Architect

Alexander Scott (25 August 1920 – 12 January 2005) was a British architect. His work was part of the architecture event in the art competition at the 1948 Summer Olympics.
