= John Lessels =

Scottish architect and artist (1809-1883)

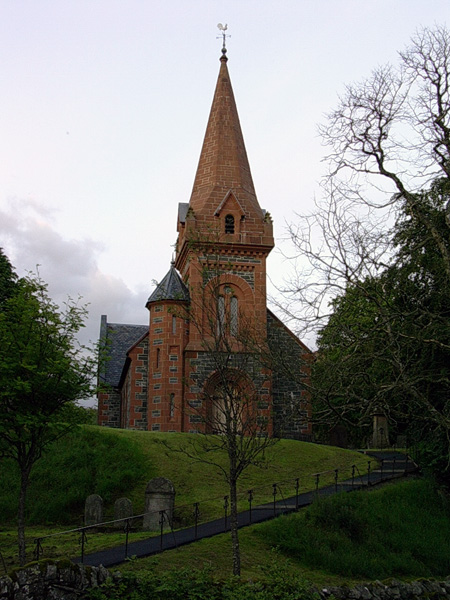
Tweedsmuir Parish Church (1875)

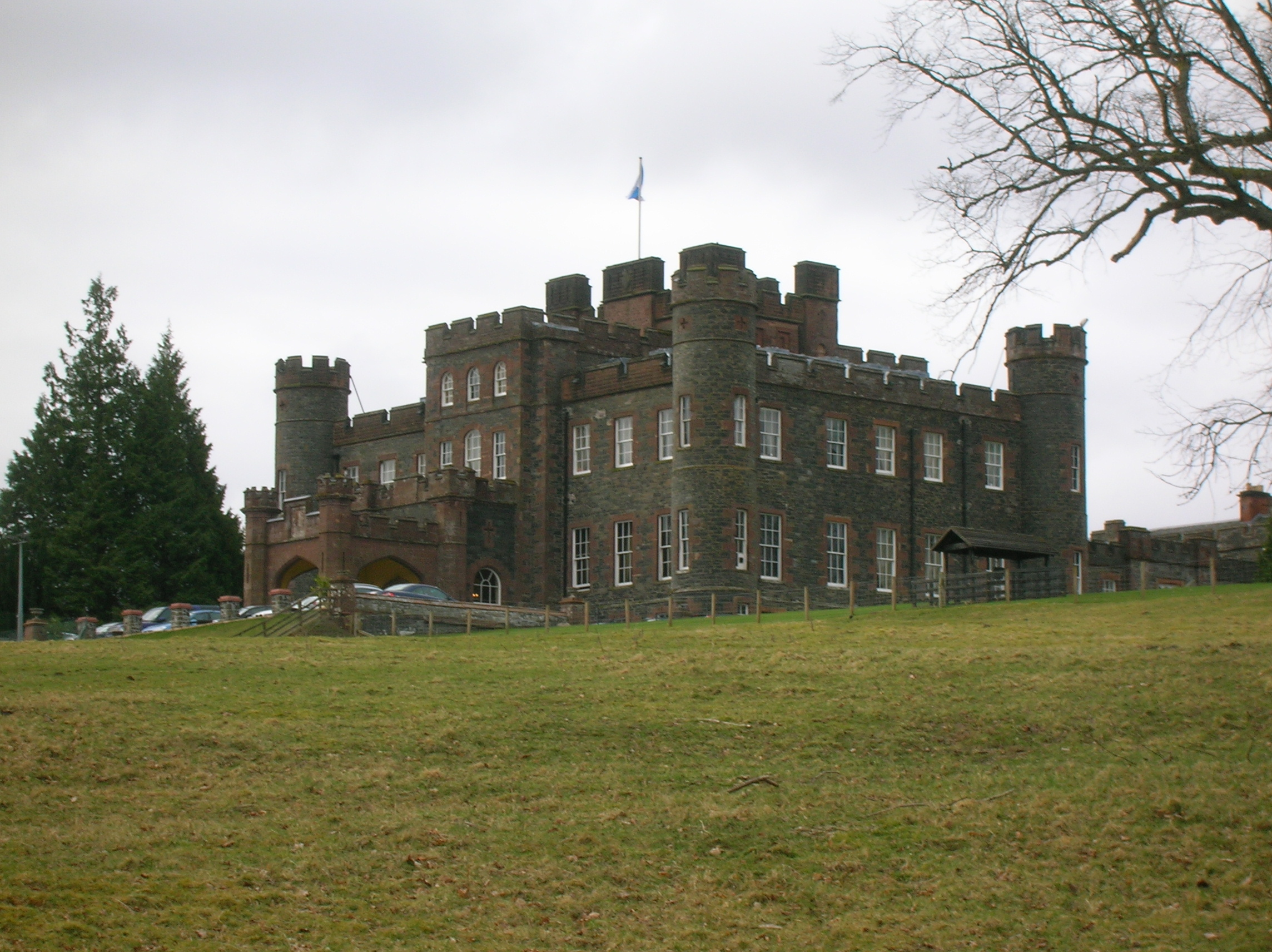
Stobo Castle

John Lessels (9 January 1809 – 12 November 1883) was a Scottish architect and artist, active in Edinburgh and the Scottish Borders (particularly in the former county of Berwickshire).

== Life ==
He was born and educated in Kirkcaldy, Fife, and initially worked for his father as a carpenter on the Raith estate. He joined the office of William Burn (1789–1870), acting as one of his inspector of works until he established his own practice in a flat at 7 St Vincent Street in Edinburgh's Northern or Second New Town in 1846. Important commissions included the Walker Estate, the area of the Western New Town developed from the 1850s and the Edinburgh publishing firm of Thomas Nelson by 1860. He was appointed as joint architect to the City Improvement Trust, with David Cousin, in 1866, and oversaw the redevelopment of parts of the Old Town and completion of multiple incomplete schemes in the New Town. In 1858 he moved to 21 Heriot Row, a Georgian townhouse facing onto Queen Street Gardens, which was his home and office.

Among his pupils were David MacGibbon (1831–1902) and Robert Rowand Anderson (1834–1921). Lessels was a keen photographer, and was president of the Edinburgh Photographic Society for several years. He also regularly exhibited oil and watercolour paintings at the Royal Scottish Academy.

He was a prominent freemason and member of the Old Kilwinning Lodge on St John St off the Canongate.

He is buried in Dean Cemetery. The grave lies in the first northern extension in a north-west section, set back but visible from the main east-west path. His monument is in the form of an unusual sundial and states, wrongly, his date of birth as 1808. It formerly bore his portrait on a photographic glazed tile.

== Family life ==
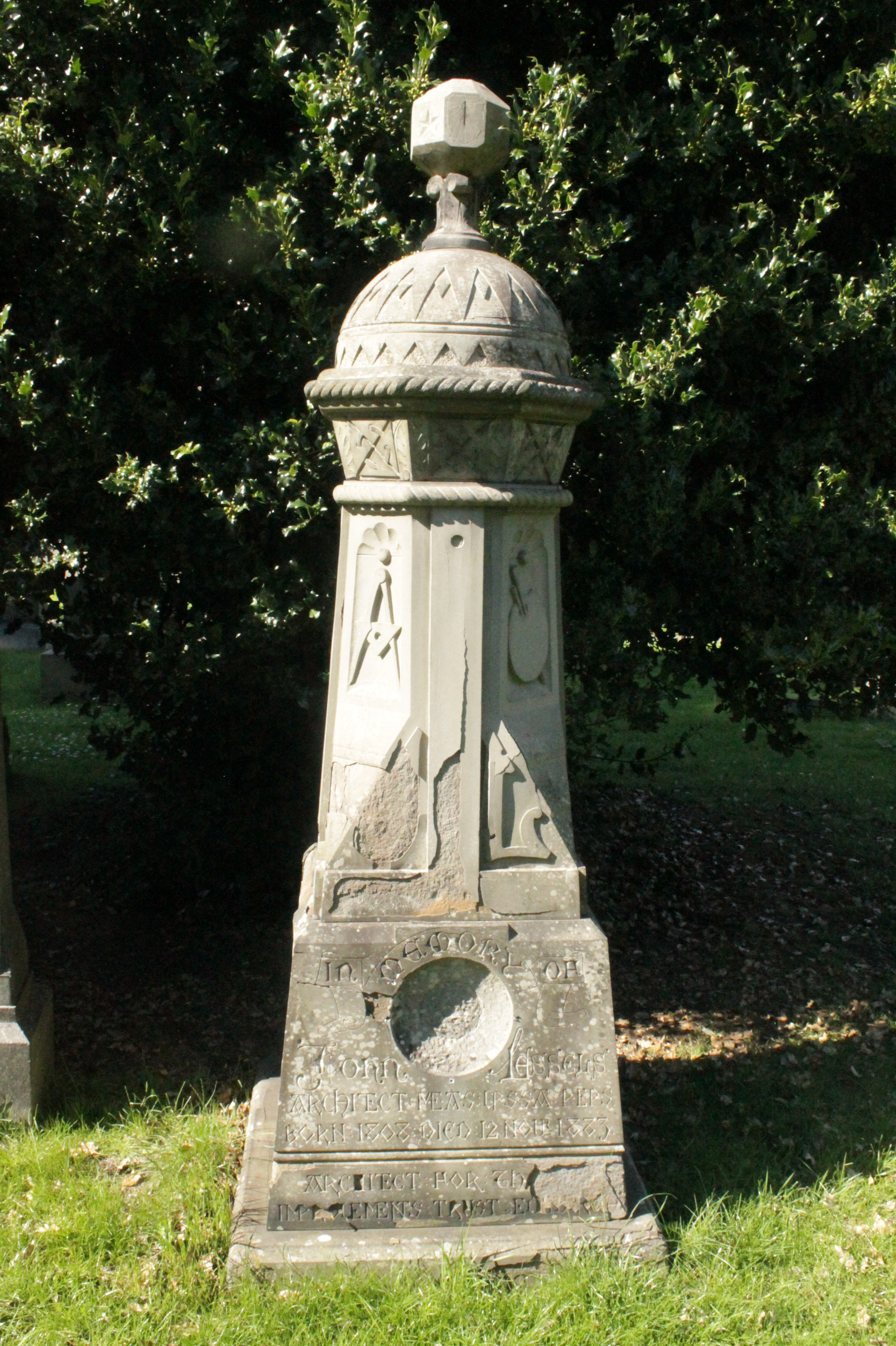
The grave of John Lessels, Dean Cemetery

John's first wife, Mary Henderson (26 June 1808 – 2 January 1858) bore him four daughters and four sons. His second wife was Gertrude A. H. Neffkins (d. 13 May 1884).

His first son, also John (1833–1914), partnered his father with a branch office in Perth. His second son, James (c.1834–c1905?), partnered and succeeded his father, finishing some schemes (such as Royal Crescent) following his father's death.

== List of Works ==
Lessels was a prolific tenement designer over and above his individual "landmark" buildings. His works include:

- Stobo Castle, Peeblesshire (1849)
- Melville Crescent, in the centre of Melville Street, Edinburgh (1855)
- Victoria Primary School, Newhaven, Edinburgh (1861)
- Chester Street, Edinburgh (1862)
- 1–7 Coates Place, Edinburgh (1864)
- St. Mary Street and Jeffrey Street, Edinburgh (1866)
- 1-14 Drumsheugh Gardens, Edinburgh (1874-1882)
- 4–24, 48–58 Manor Place, Edinburgh (1866–1892)
- 15–32 West Maitland Street, Edinburgh (1864)
- 3–21 Palmerston Place, Edinburgh (1870)
- Replacement Trinity College Church on Jeffrey Street with a hall (Trinity Apse) attached to rear on Chalmers Close built from stones from original kirk (1877)
