= Hermits and Termits =

Georgian house in Edinburgh, Scotland

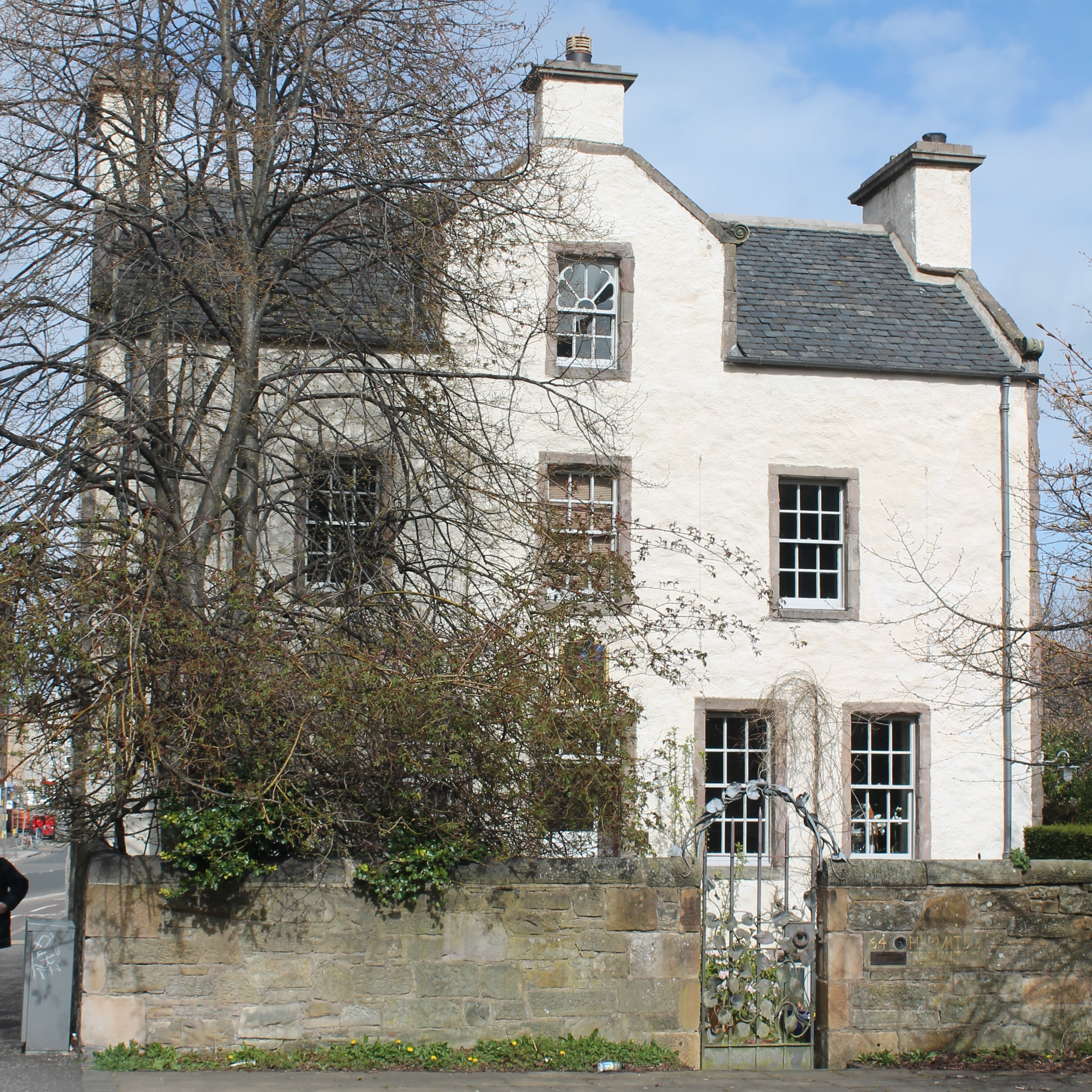
- Interactive map of the Hermits and Termits area
- Former names: The Coalyard House; David Scott's House

General information
- Status: In use
- Type: House
- Architectural style: Scottish vernacular/Georgian
- Classification: Category B
- Location: St Leonard's, Edinburgh, 64 St Leonard's Street, Edinburgh, EH9 9SW, Edinburgh, Scotland
- Coordinates: 55°56′31.8″N 3°10′43.43″W
- Construction started: 1734
- Completed: before 1736
- Renovated: 1982–1983
- Owner: Private

Technical details
- Material: Harled rubble
- Floor count: 4

Listed Building – Category B
- Official name: St Leonard Street 64, The Coalyard House, Formerly Called Hermits and Termits
- Designated: 12 December 1974
- Reference no.: LB30164

Hermits and Termits is a Georgian house in St Leonard's, Edinburgh, Scotland. Named for the lands of St Leonard's Hospital, it was completed around 1734 and restored from 1982 after a period of dereliction.

The name Hermits and Termits most likely derives from the crofts of the nearby St Leonard's Hospital. Although the hospital closed some time after the Reformation, the name continued to be applied to its lands and was given to the current house, constructed for William Clifton around 1734. In the early 19th century, the house was the boyhood home of the artists William Bell Scott and David Scott. In 1826, its lands were sold to the Edinburgh and Dalkeith Railway and it remained in railway use until the closure of the surrounding depot in 1968. In this period, it was known as The Coalyard House. After a period of dereliction and threatened demolition, the house was restored in 1982 by Benjamin Tindall. It is currently a private residence.

The house has been described as an outstanding example of vernacular architecture in Edinburgh. Its harled exterior is distinguished by a gablet and a plaque with the Cliftons' crest. The interior retains much original woodwork and plasterwork. It has been a Category B listed building since 1974.

== Name ==
The name appears to be connected with the two crofts of the Hospital of St Leonard, which, in its foundation charter of 1493 are referred to as "Le Terraris Croft" and "Le Hermitis Croft". Together, these formed an area of 5.5 Scots acres (2.8ha). Subsequent variations include "Hermitts and Termetts" in 1679, "St. Hermitts" in 1693, "Hermans and St. Hermans" in 1694, "Hermitts St. Hermits", and "Hermit St. Tormits" in 1780. The area is referred to as "Hermitsfield" in 1748 and "St Hermans" in 1759.

"Le Hermitis Croft" may refer to hermits in a generic sense, common before the Reformation; to a specific but now anonymous local hermit; to the inhabitants of the hospital; or to Saint Leonard himself. Alternatively, prior to the construction of the hospital, St Leonard's Hill may have been the site of a hermitage to shelter travellers who arrived from the south after the nightly closing of the town gates. "Le Terraris Croft" refers to the terrarius or terrar: a manager of the lands of Holyrood Abbey on behalf of its monks. By 1578, the two crofts were one unit, which would become known as "Hermits and Termits". In 1995, the crofts gave their names to two newly developed nearby streets: Hermits Croft and Terrars Croft.

An alternative origin was offered by Lord Hailes, who proposed that the title derives from Eremitae Sanctae Eremi: the monks of Saint Anthony of Egypt.

== History ==
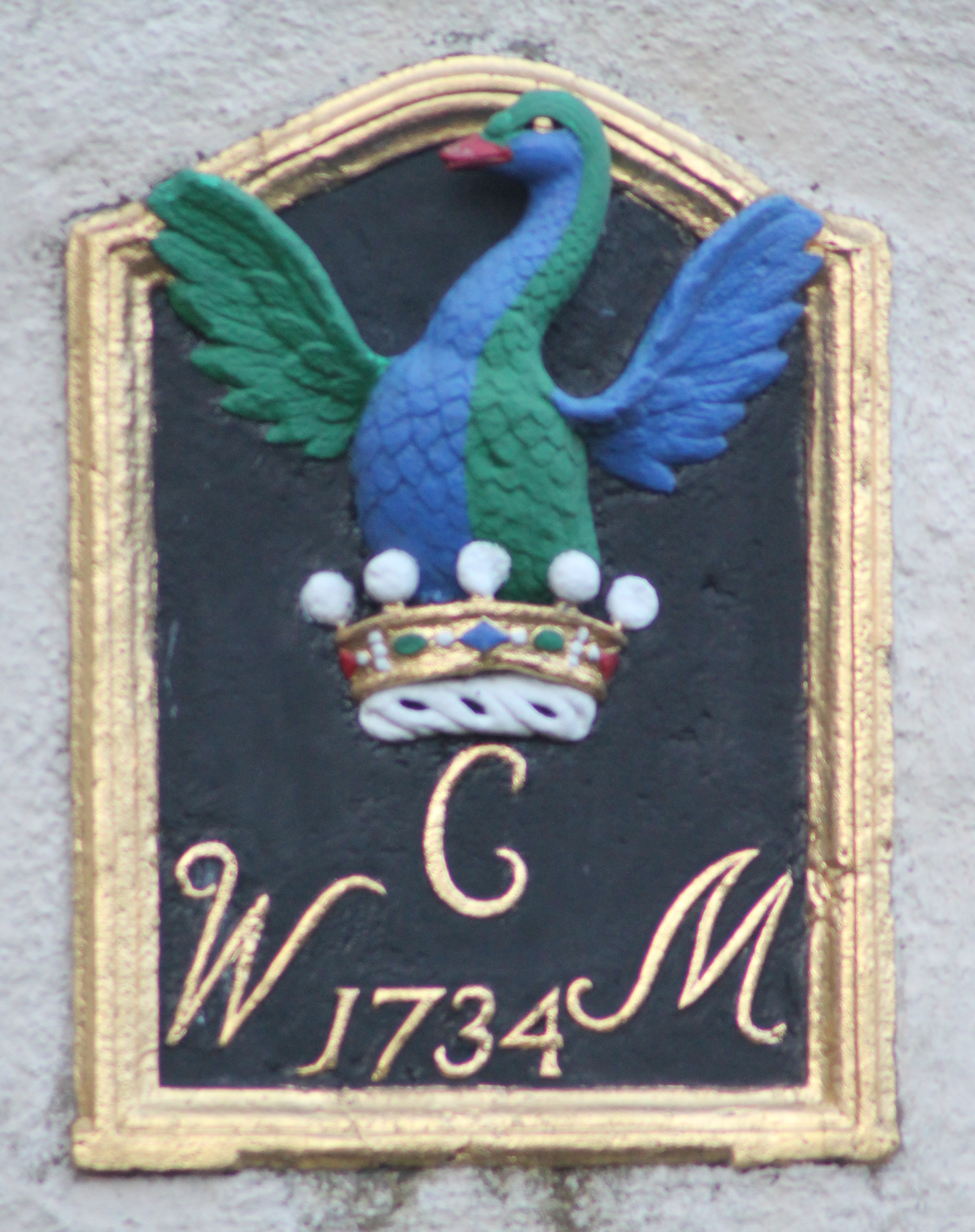
Above the front door are the crest and initials of William and Mary Clifton: the house's first occupants

The ancient crofts of the hospital of St Leonard were leased shortly before the Reformation and were in possession of the Robeson family by the end of the 16th century. From the Robesons, it passed to the Reid family in 1690. In 1734, the widow of the last Reid gave to William Clifton, a solicitor of Excise, and his wife Mary "the southmost yard of Hermits and Termits, and two acres of ground adjacent thereto now possessed by the said Mr. William Clifton, and two southmost houses of the row of houses called Hermits and Termits". (Note: David J. Black, Henry M. Paton, and William Forbes Gray all refute the mistaken idenfitification of Hermits and Termits with the Castle o' Clouts: a nearby house of similar date, demolished in 1970. The origin of this confusion appears to have been "The Castle o' Clouts, a Romance of St. Leonard's": a work of fiction serialised in the Edinburgh Evening News in the 1920s.)

The house must have been completed by November 1736, when all the houses of Hermits and Termits except Clifton's were sold. In 1739, the house passed to the Cliftons' son, also called William, vicar of Embleton, Northumberland. The younger Clifton rented out the property until its sale in 1757. The property was sold again in 1780.

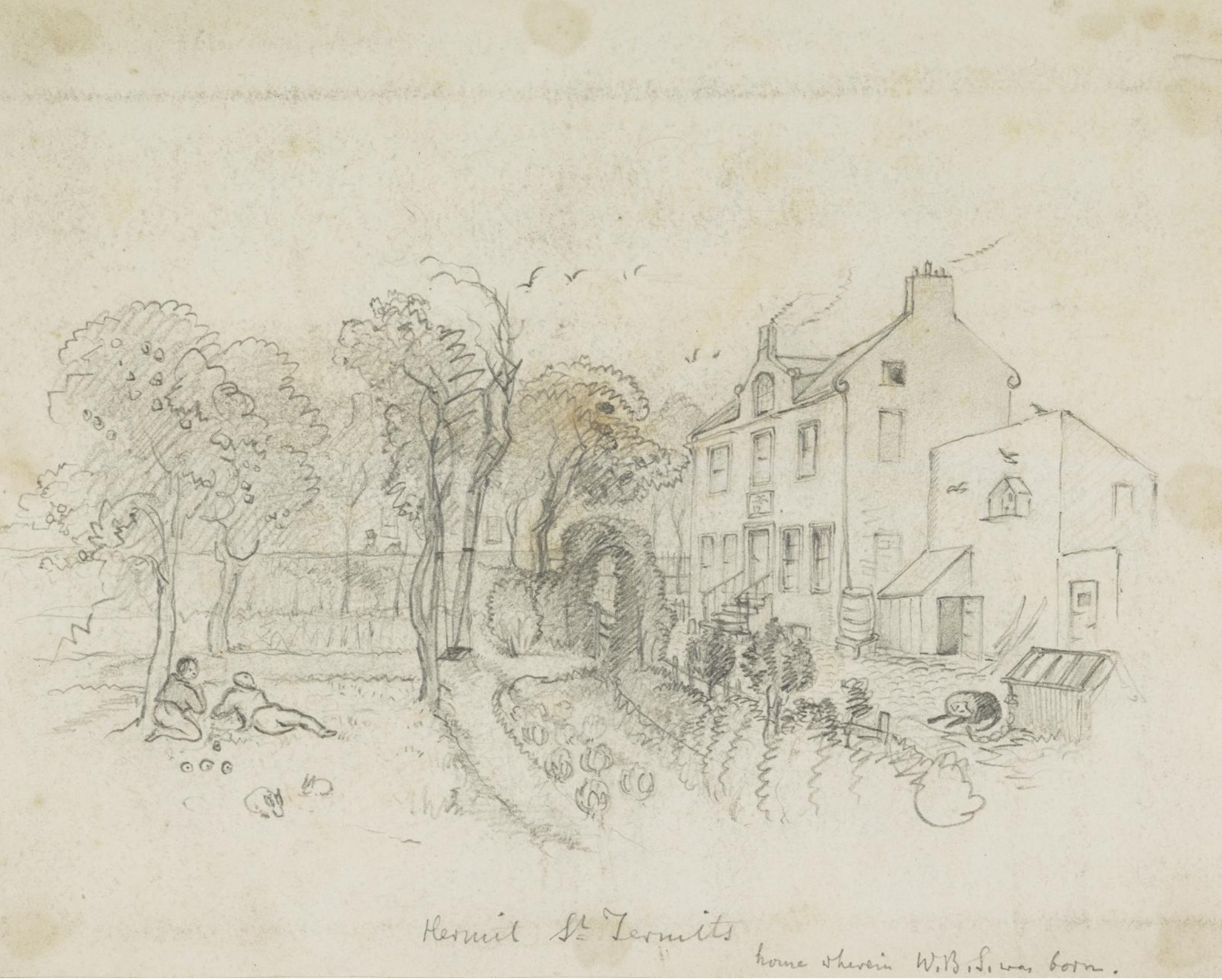
Hermits and Termits drawn by William Bell Scott, who, with his brother David grew up in the house

In 1807, the house was leased to Robert Scott, an engraver, and his wife Alice. The Scotts raised two sons here who would go on to become prominent artists: the history painter David Scott and William Bell Scott, who was associated with the Pre-Raphaelite Brotherhood. William Bell Scott frequently drew the house, which he referred to as "as much a part of the family as any of its living occupants". As a result of this association, the house has sometimes been referred to as "David Scott's House".

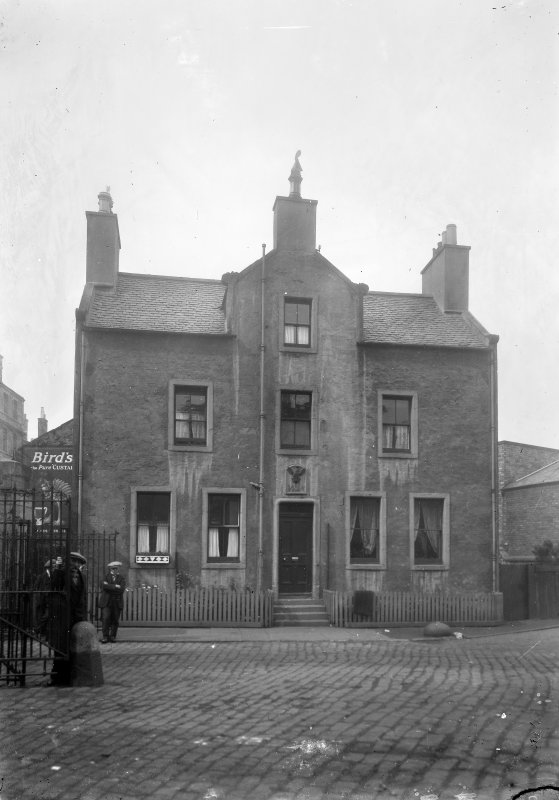
The house around 1900, at which time it was railway property and known as the Coalyard House

In 1826, the house and lands were bought by the Edinburgh and Dalkeith Railway and the Scotts vacated the building soon after. The railway company used Hermits and Termits as offices then as a station master's house. The railway's main cargo was coal and Hermits and Termits was soon enclosed by the boundary wall of the coalyard. In this period, it became known as "Coalyard House". It continued in use as railway accommodation until 1968, when the St Leonard's rail depot closed. In the same year, its last railway tenant, a retired engine-driver, died.

In 1970, the City of Edinburgh Council purchased Hermits and Termits and its surrounding lands as the site for an interchange in a proposed diversion of the A1, which would take the road through the west side of Holyrood Park. At this point, the demolition of the house seemed, in David J. Black's words, "a foregone conclusion". A campaign, led by Moultrie Kelsall, David Black, Denis Mollison, and the Cockburn Association prevented the house's demolition. The house was protected as a Category B listed building in 1974. In this period, the house was falling into dereliction. Its chimneys shortened in 1972 and its windows were later bricked up; it became the target of vandalism and metal theft.

In 1980, Lothian Regional Council declared the highway plan redundant. The house was put on the market, asking for both proposals and offers and Benjamin Tindall was successful in both. Charles McKean describes this as an "act of faith when St Leonard's was still derelict". After the restoration, the house became the office of Tindall's architectural practice before returning to use as a private residence.

== Description ==
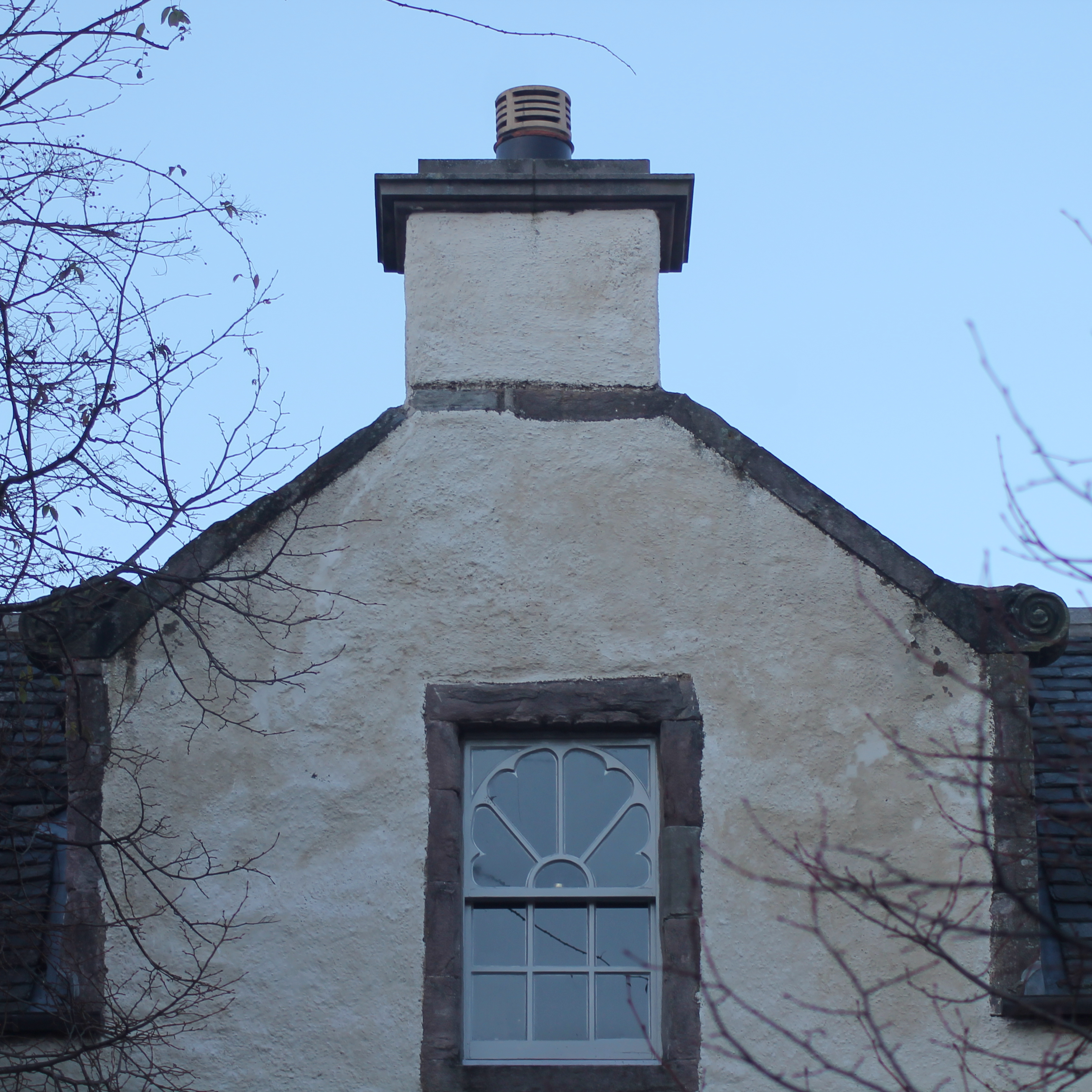
The central gablet with a chimney at the apex and scrolled skew-putts

=== Exterior ===
...as a complete example of early eighteenth century vernacular architecture, it is among the best in the entire city.

— David J. Black, An Historical Account (1972)

The house has a simple oblong plan and contains a cellar and three upper storeys. The exterior walls are harled rubble with chamfered dressings and scrolled skew-putts. The narrower east and west ends are gabled while, in the south front, a central gablet containing a chimney stack at its pinnacle rises above the eaves. The front elevation follows a "pyramidal" plan, forming five bays on the ground floor and three on the first floor, rising to the single bay of the gablet in the attic storey.

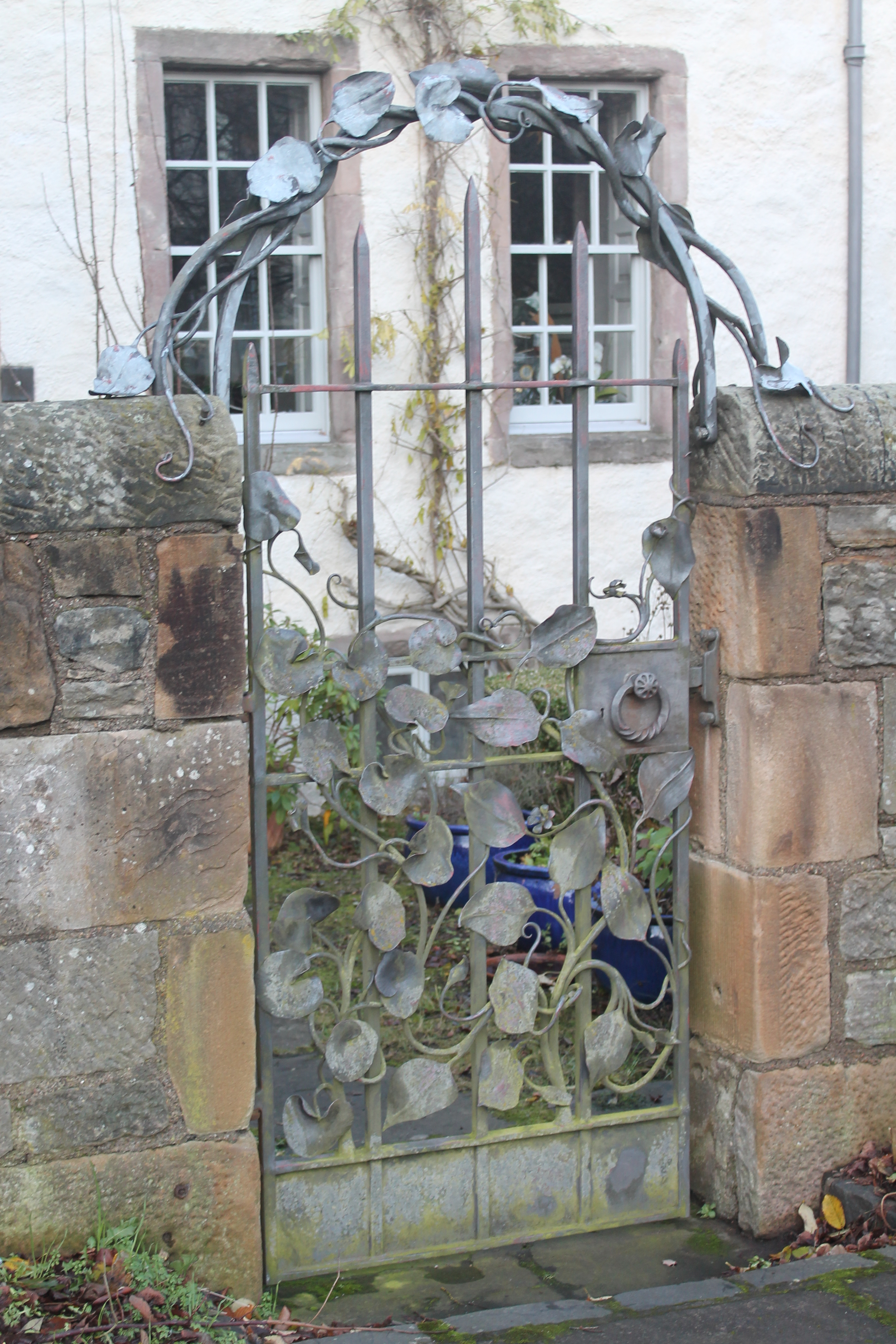
The garden gate: designed by Benjamin Tindall and cast by Alan Dawson, added 1983

Above the front door is a stone plaque, which was found broken inside the house at its restoration, having been removed in 1971 after the house's abandonment. During the restoration, it was restored, painted, and reinstated in its original position. The plaque depicts William Clifton's crest along with the initials C W M (for Clifton, William, Mary) and the date 1734, the year in which the Cliftons took possession of the lands of Hermits and Termits. The blazon of Clifton's crest is: "Out of a ducal coronet gules a demi-peacock per pale argent and sable, the wings expanded, counterchanged". In the plaque, however, the coronet is that of a baron rather than a duke.

The arched garden gate, with a design imitating hosta and nasturtium, was designed by Benjamin Tindall. It evokes a gate shown in a similar position in one of William Bell Scott's drawings of the house. It was forged in steel in 1983 by blacksmith Alan Dawson. Dawson also forged the bannisters of the front steps, which use a similar design. Two stone rams' heads are built into the boundary wall. These were recovered from West St Giles' Church in Marchmont, which was demolished in 1974.

=== Interior ===
The front door opens into a panelled hallway containing a Georgian geometric staircase with twisting mahogany balusters. On the ground floor, there are two rooms, one on each side of the hallway: a dining room and a kitchen. Prior to the house's dereliction and restoration, the Royal Commission on the Ancient Monuments of Scotland found original pine panelling in all but two of the rooms. When the restoration of the house began, much original woodwork and plasterwork was found to have survived. This has been retained, including a plaster scallop detail above the staircase.

In the dining room, the panelling contains a secret door as well as a crockery niche flanked by woodwork pilasters. This niche is an example of the buffet-niche: a common feature of dining rooms in larger Scottish houses of the 17th and 18th centuries. David J. Black refers to the dining room as "one of the best examples of its kind now left in Edinburgh". On the first floor are three rooms with a further three and a box room in the top floor.
