= Alice Boyd =

Scottish painter (1825–1897)

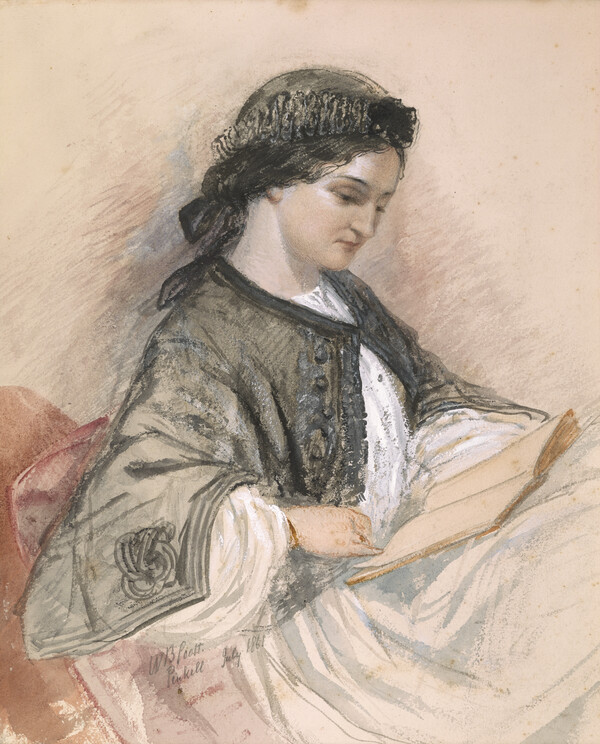
- Portrait by William Bell Scott, 1861
- Born: Ayrshire; 1825
- Died: 1897
- Style: Pre-Raphaelite
- Parents: Spencer Boyd, 12th Laird of Penkill (father); Margaret Losh (mother)

Alice Boyd (1825–1897) was a Scottish Pre-Raphaelite painter who was also the 14th Laird of Penkill Castle in Ayrshire in Scotland.

== Biography ==
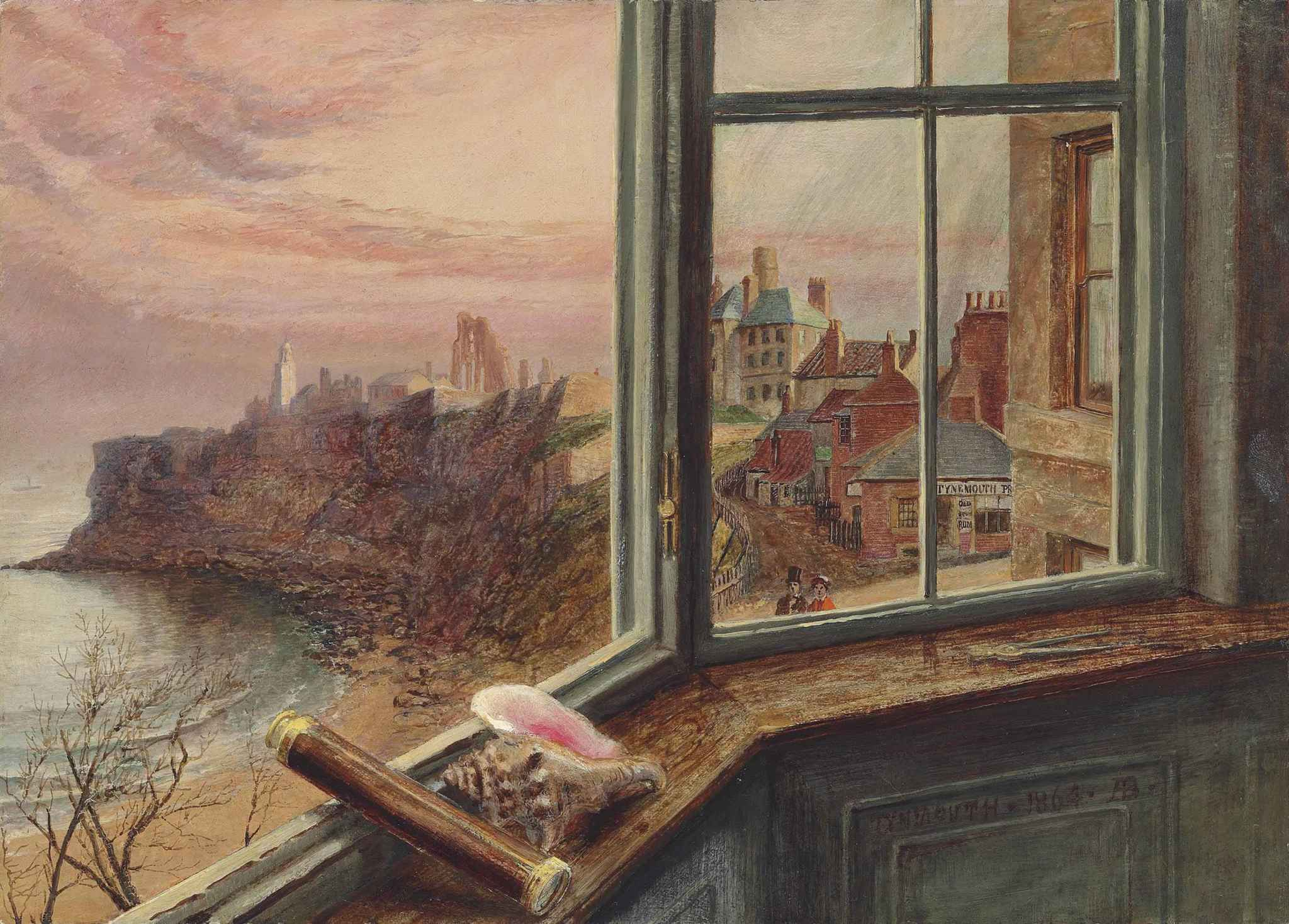
Alice Boyd, View from the Window of Balcony House, Tynemouth, oil on cardboard, 1864

Alice Boyd was born in south Ayrshire, Scotland, in 1825, the daughter of Margaret Losh and Spencer Boyd, 12th Laird of Penkill, whose family had lived at Penkill Castle since the early 16th century. Her father died when she was one year old and her mother remarried, to a man named Henry Courtney. In 1858, her mother died and she went to Newcastle-on-Tyne to live for a time with her grandfather, William Losh, a well-to-do merchant. Her family had an "alkali business."

While staying with her grandfather, Alice met the pre-Raphaelite painter and poet William Bell Scott, who was then master of the Government School of Design. She became his pupil in 1859.

Around this time, Alice moved back to Penkill Castle to live with her elder brother Spencer, the 13th Laird of Penkill, with whom she remained close throughout her life. In 1860, Bell Scott visited Penkill, and Boyd and he began a liaison that would last until his death in 1890. Although unhappily married, Bell Scott refused to cause a scandal by leaving his wife, and a workable ménage à trois was established: Boyd spent winters with William and his wife in London, while they came to Penkill in the summers. Other Pre-Raphaelite artists and their friends also came to Penkill to work on their art, including Dante Gabriel Rossetti, Christina Rossetti, and Lawrence Alma-Tadema. In 1862, Dante Gabriel Rossetti drew Boyd's portrait in profile.

Trained by Bell Scott, Boyd worked in similar genres: historical and mythical subjects, landscapes, and portraits. She also illustrated some of Bell Scott's poems. After his death in 1890, her output dropped off steeply. She did not exhibit much, if at all, during her lifetime, and most of her work is still in private collections.

In 1865, Boyd's brother Spencer died childless and she became the 14th Laird of Penkill and inherited Penkill Castle. She is credited with extending the original Penkill Castle grounds towards the end of the century.

Boyd's family papers are held by Princeton University and include an unpublished history by a relative of her life at Penkill Castle.
