= St Leonard's Hospital, Edinburgh =

St Leonard's Hospital
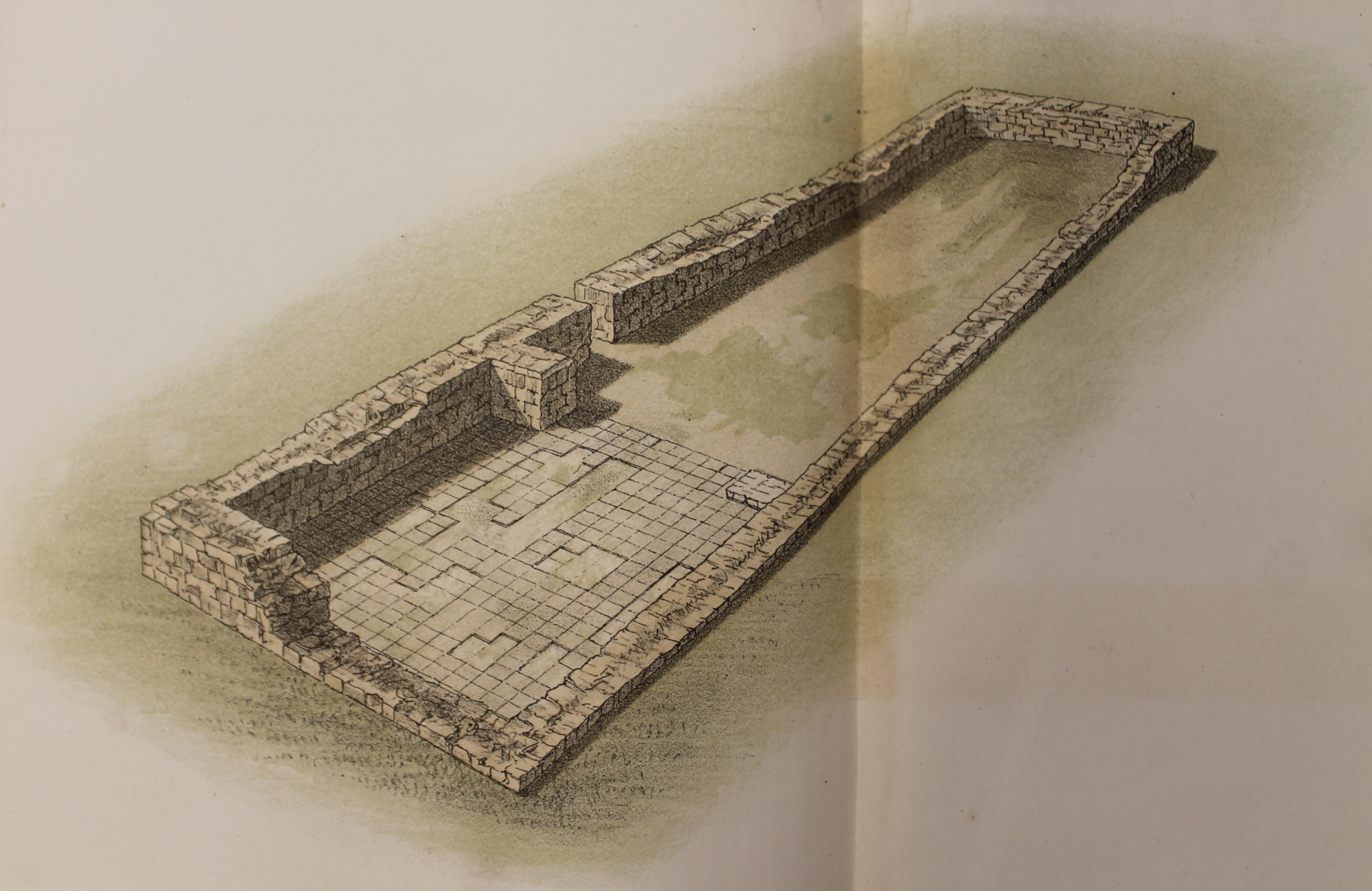
- The ruins of the chapel in 1854

- Location in Edinburgh

Geography
- Location: St Leonard's, Edinburgh, Midlothian, Scotland
- Coordinates: 55°56′37.41″N 3°10′40.12″W

Organisation
- Care system: Medieval sub-monastic care
- Type: Medieval hospital
- Religious affiliation: Roman Catholic Church (before 1560); Church of Scotland (after 1560)
- Patron: Holyrood Abbey (until 1556)

Services
- Beds: 6

History
- Founded: 12th century

The Hospital of St Leonard was a mediaeval hospital in the St Leonard's area of Edinburgh, Scotland, to which it gave its name. Founded by David I, it existed until some time after the Scottish Reformation.

The hospital was founded by David I and re-founded in 1493 by James IV at the bequest of Robert Bellenden, abbot of Holyrood. The abbots of Holyrood served as the hospital's superiors and the manse of the hospital's vicar was located near the Abbey in the Canongate. The hospital supported support six "hospitallers" or "bedemen", who worked the hospital's two crofts: the Hermit's Croft and the Terrar's Croft. It is notable for having served as a meeting place for the Incoporation of Hammermen and as the site of a gathering of conspirators in an unsuccessful plot to kill James V in 1529. The hospital continued in use after the Reformation but its buildings were ruinous by 1653.

Attached to the hospital was St Leonard's Chapel, whose ruins were excavated and demolished between 1854 and 1855. All that then remained of the hospital was its chapel, which stood around 70 ft (21m) long by 20 ft (6m) wide. The excavations uncovered a large number of burials in its vicinity. James Clark Technical School was built over the site in 1913. The hospital's name lives on in the name of St Leonard's, Edinburgh while its crofts gave their names to Hermits and Termits.

== History ==
=== Foundation ===
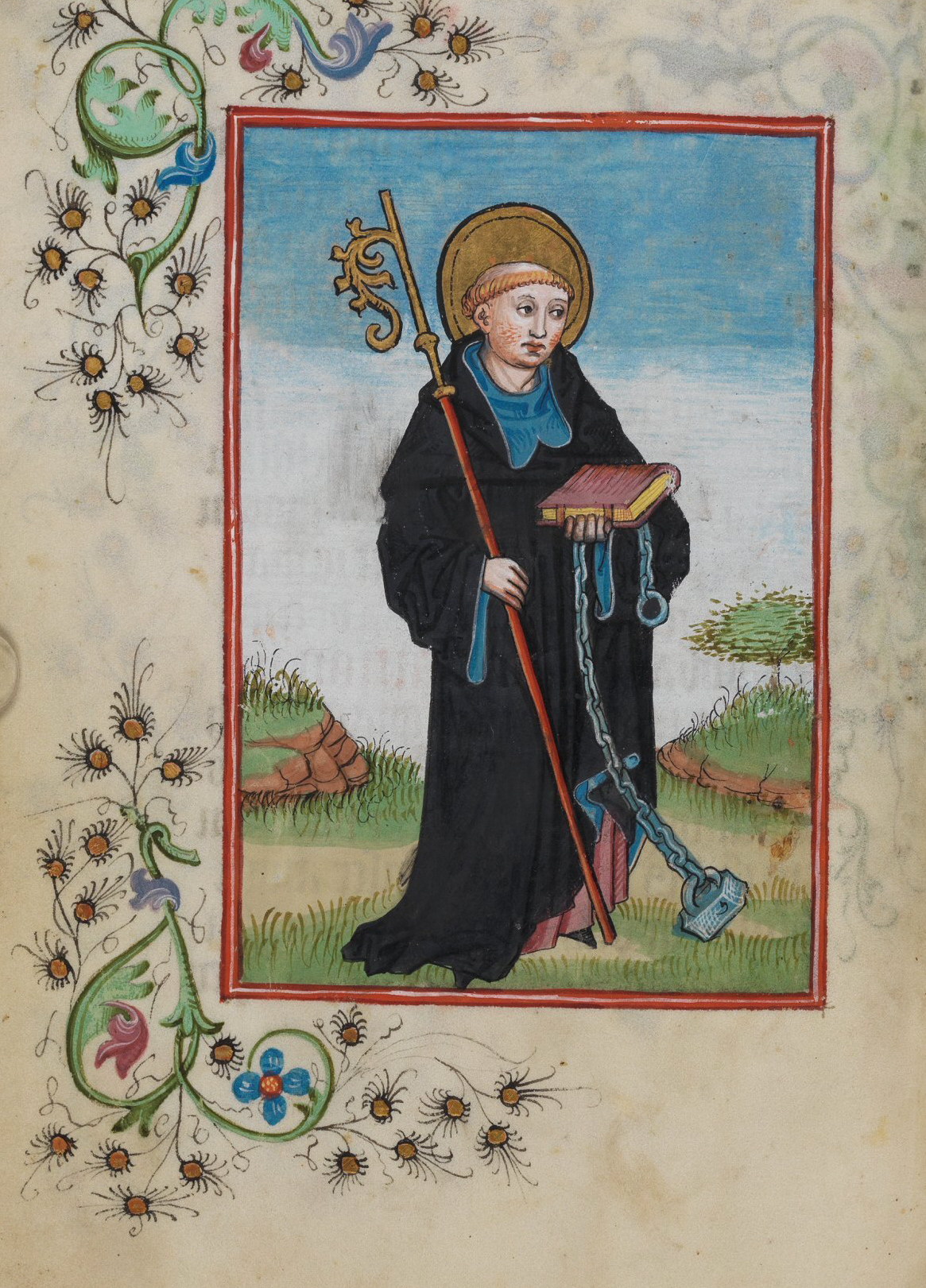
15th-century German miniature of Saint Leonard: a popular dedicatee of religious institutes in mediaeval Scotland

The hospital's foundation by David I is attested by a deed of between 1219 and 1239 in the register of the charters of Dunfermline Abbey: in this, the "brethren of the Hospital of St. Leonard Edinburgh" are party to a controversy. The hospital and in letters of 1334 ordering Edward Balliol's appointment of Thomas of Wakefield as chaplain to the hospital. The hospital was granted to Holyrood Abbey by David II. It appears again in a bull of Pope Clement VII confirms a charter issued by Robert III in 1391, which renews a gift to the hospital of St Leonard "annexed to the barony of Brochton" and founded by David I.

In a mediaeval and early modern context, the term "hospital" applied to institutions covering a wide variety of care and education functions. John Durkan characterises the inhabitants of St Leonard's as "respectable people who had come down in the world". The hospital was situated on St Leonard's Hill, at the edge of the King's Park and on other side of a valley from the Salisbury Crags. The Boroughloch lay to the west and Duddingston Loch to the south-east. In George Forrest's words:

The prospect from this hill cannot at one time have been surpassed for striking objects of natural beauty by anything in the neighbourhood of Edinburgh; and we need therefore not be surprised at the hill having been chosen for the site of a Chapel and Hospital; nor could a better situation have been chosen for the poor and deserving in their old age. All around it was then a series of lakes and valleys.

The hospital may have replaced an earlier hermitage used to shelter travellers who had arrived after the closing of the town gates at night. This origin may be reflected in the Hermit's Croft, which, along with the Terrar's Croft was one of two crofts attached to the hospital. (Note: Other theories proposed for the name of "Le Hermitis Croft" include that it refers to hermits in a generic sense, common before the Reformation; to a specific but now anonymous local hermit; to the inhabitants of the hospital; or to Saint Leonard himself.) The two crofts were united before 1578 and became known as Hermits and Termits, which gives its name to an extant house of 1734.

Saint Leonard was a popular dedicatee of chapels and hospitals in mediaeval Scotland. In addition to St Leonard's College, St Andrews, chapels and/or hospitals dedicated to the saint stood in Ayr, Dunfermline, Lanark, and Roxburghshire. Two other dedications to Saint Leonard existed in Midlothian.

=== Re-foundation ===
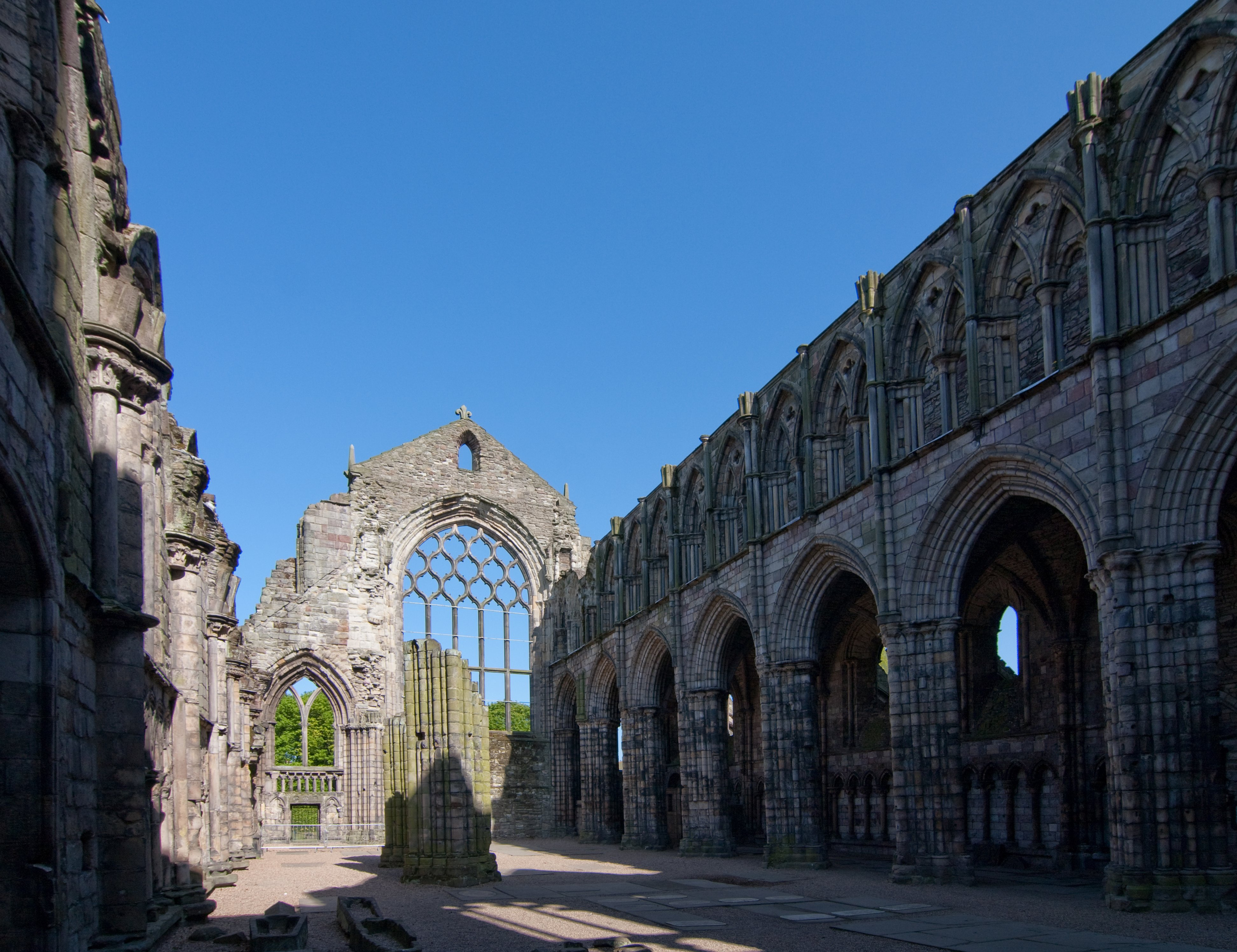
Holyrood Abbey: St Leonard's Hospital was granted to the abbey by David II; in 1493, Robert Bellenden, abbot of Holyrood, refounded the hospital

The last building on St Leonard's Hill was erected in 1493: the date of its re-foundation charter from James IV to Robert Bellenden, abbot of Holyrood. The charter notes the hospital had "become ruined, dilapidated, and unhabitable, and unapplicable to the pious use to which it was adapted by our predecessors from time immemorial". Bellenden had earlier, in 1472, attained a papal bull to disconnect the hospital from Holyrood Abbey, making it an independent house with its own rector; however, the bull was never carried out. Bellenden's petition followed a petition of 1420, claiming the union with Holyrood had been attained by simony and should be dissolved.

Donations to the hospital by James IV are recorded in 1506, 1507, and 1508. The king occasionally worshipped in the chapel. Mons Meg was brought here after the siege of Dumbarton Castle ahead of receiving a new cradle in 1498. The Incorporation of Hammermen met annually with only a few exceptions from 1494 to 1558, after which time they used the Magdalen Chapel. On 2 February 1529, members of the Douglas family and allies met near St Leonard's Chapel to form their abortive plot to assassinate James V.

There are few records of the hospital's earliest inhabitants; however, the quota of six "bedemen" or "hospitallers" appears to have been maintained until the Reformation. These residents laboured the two crofts south of the hospital. A new brother of the hospital, inducted in 1555, was shown offered space for a bed in the vestibule of the chapel and was assigned his own garden.

The chaplain's manse is described in Bellenden's foundation of 1493 as "a great mansion lying beside the gate of the monastery on the north side of the high street of the Canongate": around modern-day Abbey Strand. The manse appears to have been ruined in the Burning of Edinburgh in 1544 and restored in 1561, after the Reformation, by the Commendators of Holyrood.

=== Decline ===
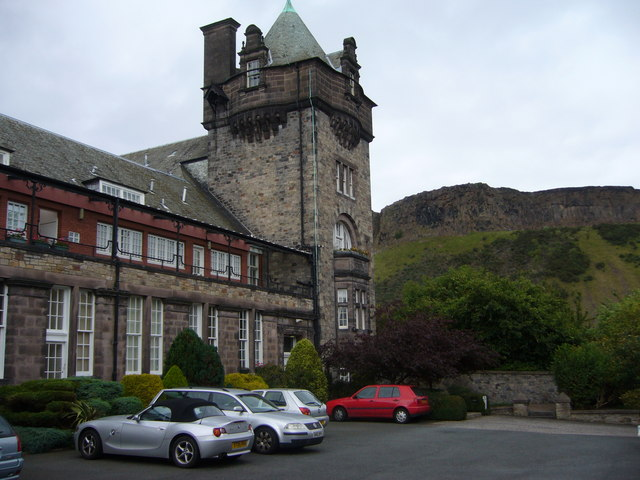
The former James Clark Technical school, constructed in 1913 on the site of St Leonard's Hospital

The details of the decline of the hospital is uncertain. In 1556, shortly before the Scottish Reformation, Mary, Queen of Scots granted St Leonard's and several other religious houses around Edinburgh to the town council. In 1578, the Parliament of Scotland attempted to restore revenues of former hospitals to the support of the poor. To that end, John Wardlaw was appointed Master and Provost of the Hospital of St Leonard the same year.

A gift of a place in the hospital in 1591 refers to "the place of the said hospital where the chapel formerly stood". This may indicated the hospital was then extant while the chapel had been abandoned. The hospital is referenced as being active in a disposition of 1625; however, as writs were often copied, this is not clear evidence it was still active. Certainly by this date the crofts had already passed to a feuar. In 1631, the Crown disposed the teinds to the governors of Heriot's Hospital then to the University of Edinburgh in 1641, suggesting the hospital had been long since defunct by the latter date. Reference is made to "the old ruinous hous and chappell of St. Leonards" in 1653 and to "the vestige of the almes house" in 1683.

By the beginning of the 17th century, St Leonard's Hill had become a noted site for duelling. After the Battle of Dunbar, David Leslie placed cannon on St Leonard's Hill to protect his men against Oliver Cromwell's advance into Edinburgh. By the 18th century, the chapel's grounds were used as a grave for suicides. The remaining buildings were excavated and demolished between 1854 and 1855. The area was developed as the site of the James Clark Technical School in 1913. The name of the hospital lives on in the name of the St Leonard's neighbourhood of Edinburgh.

== Buildings ==
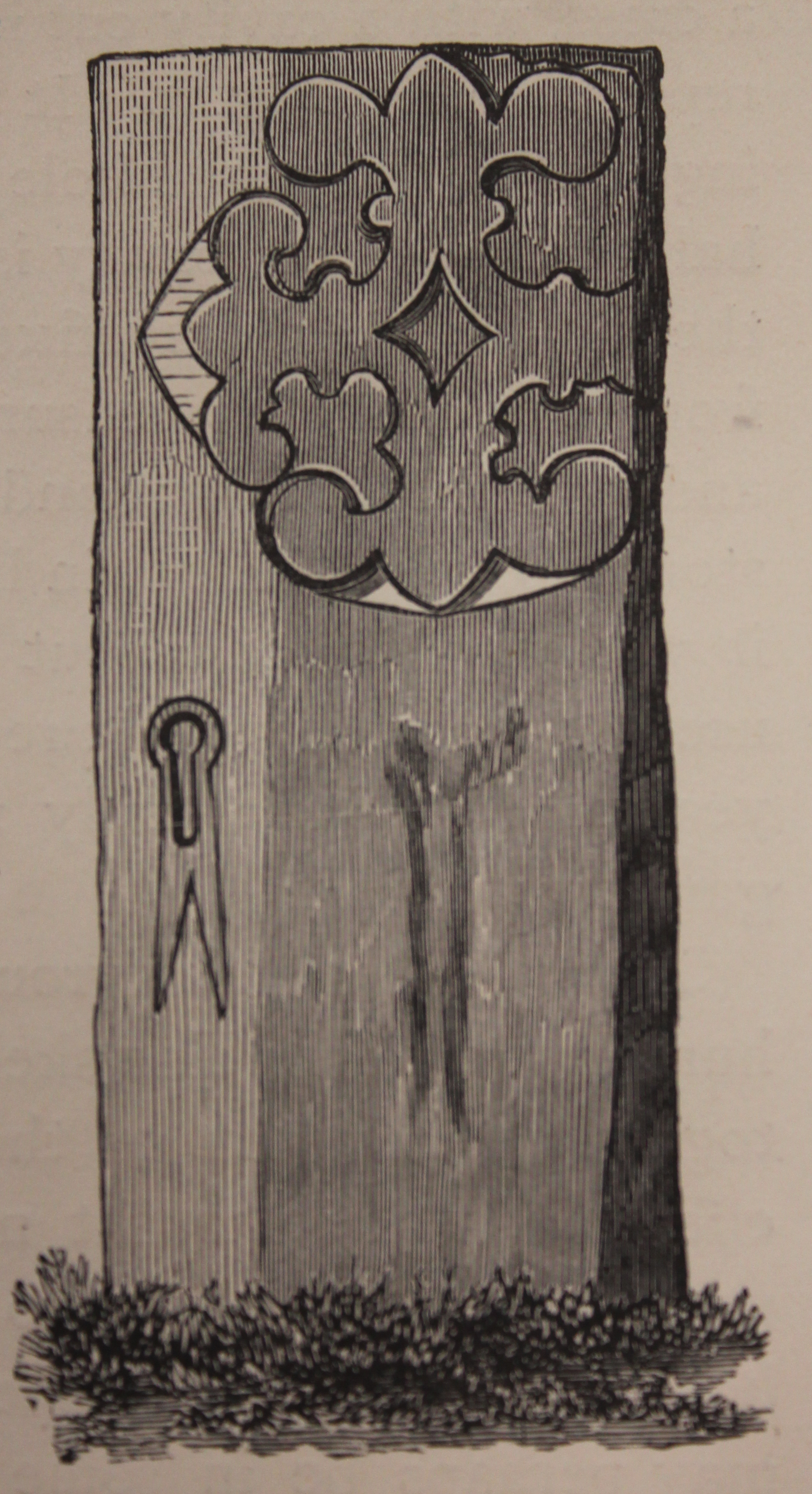
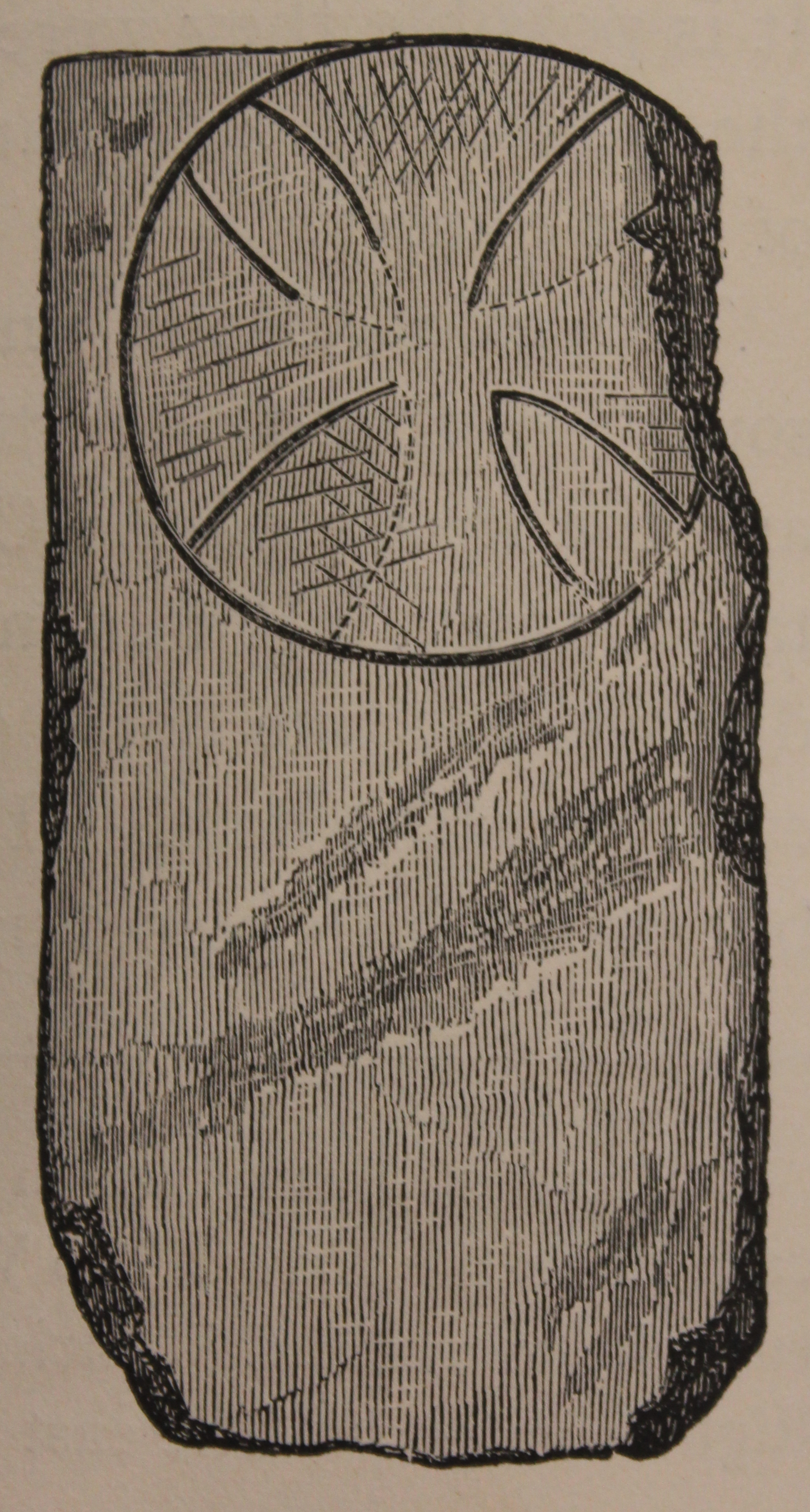
Stones found at St Leonard's Chapel

At its demolition and excavation between 1854 and 1855, the only discernible remains of a building were those of a chapel, oriented east–west. The chapel was approximately 21 m (70 ft) long by 6 m (20 ft) wide. The walls were about 1 m (3 ft) thick and built with regular blocks of sandstone. No traces of a hospital buildings was found but this was likely to have stood south of the chapel.

At the time of the survey, the walls were "very solid", rising to between 0.6 m (2 ft) and 1 m (3 ft). The bases of two pillars were found about 6 m (20 ft) from the western extremity, each projected 0.8 m (2.5 ft) into the church and was chamfered. The appear to have marked the boundary between the nave and chancel. The chancel was paved with red sandstone. In the middle of the south wall of the chapel was an external door of a little over 0.6 m (2 ft) wide. William Maitland, writing in 1753, records a "font and holy water stone" at the site; though these had disappeared before the demolition. Maitland also records a nearby cross, which was erected in memory of one Umfraville, who, according to tradition, died at the spot.

In the chancel, two stone coffins were discovered at the excavation along with many skeletons, which were arranged radially, like the spokes of a wheel, with the heads close to each other at the central point. Outside the chapel were found two slabs marked with crosses and one with shears. Many other skeletons were found in the area around the chapel along with coins from the reigns of David II, Robert III, Mary, and Charles II. Near the east end of the chapel, a red sandstone plinth of around 2 m (6 ft) diameter was found with a hole for the bases of a cross. This was broken up for rubble in 1855. (Note: George Forrest does not identify this with Umfraville's cross but to a cross mentioned by Daniel Wilson as having been destroyed in 1810; however, James Grant does.)

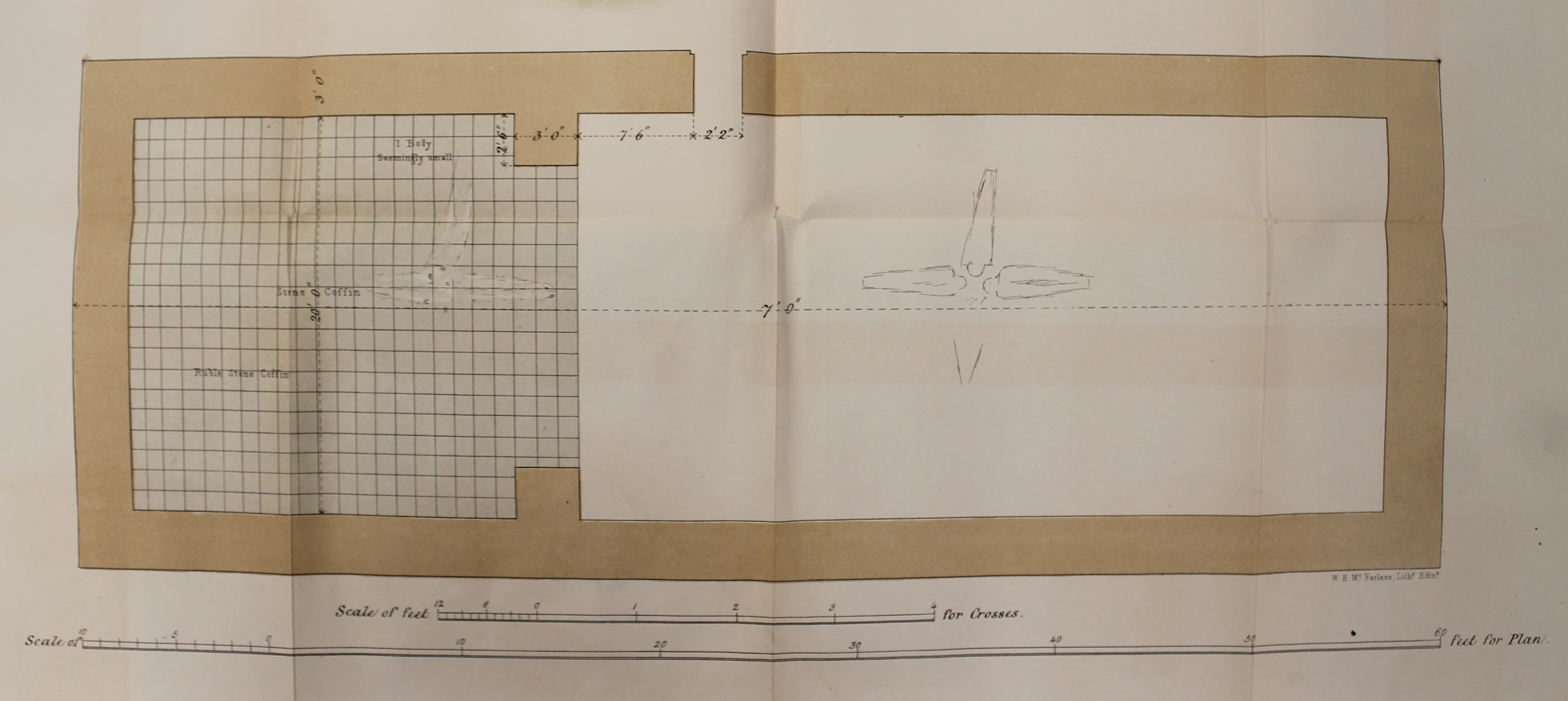
Plan of St Leonard's Chapel

== See also ==
- Hospitals in medieval Scotland
