= Stockbridge, Edinburgh =

District in Scotland

- District
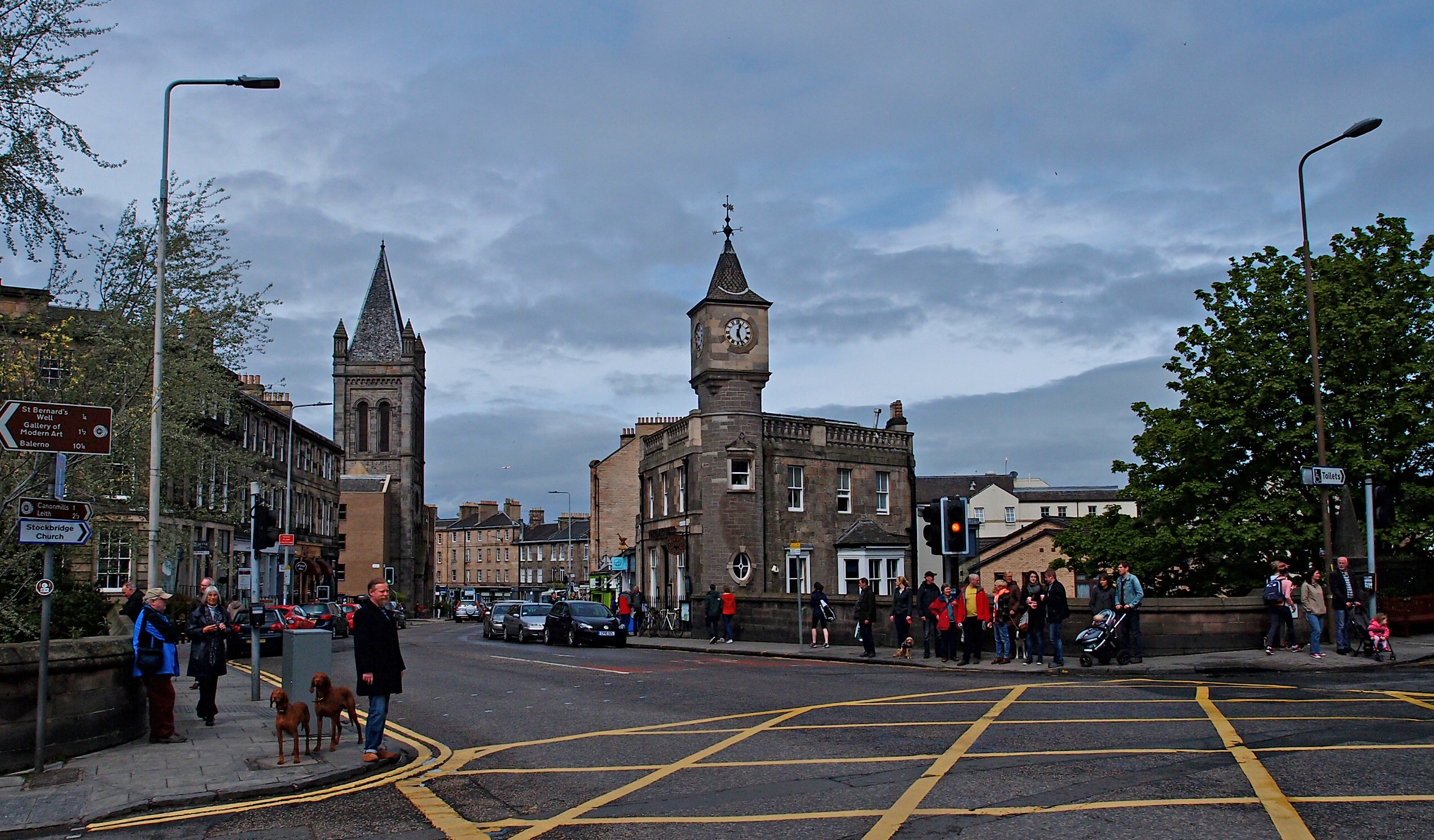
- Stockbridge in 2015

- Location within the City of Edinburgh council area Location within Scotland
- Population: 7,000
- Country: Scotland
- Sovereign state: United Kingdom
- Post town: EDINBURGH
- Postcode district: EH3
- Dialling code: 0131
- Police: Scotland
- Fire: Scottish
- Ambulance: Scottish
- UK Parliament: Edinburgh North and Leith
- Scottish Parliament: Edinburgh Central

Stockbridge is a district of Edinburgh, located north of the city centre, bounded by the New Town and by Comely Bank. The name is Scots stock brig from Anglic stocc brycg, meaning a timber bridge. Originally a small outlying village, it was incorporated into the City of Edinburgh in the 19th century. The current "Stock Bridge", built in 1801, is a stone structure spanning the Water of Leith. The painter Henry Raeburn (1756–1823) owned two adjoining estates, Deanhaugh and St Bernard's, which he developed with the assistance of the architect James Milne. Milne was also responsible for the fine St Bernard's Church (1823) in Saxe Coburg Street. Ann Street, designed by Raeburn and named after his wife, is a rare early example of a New Town street with private front gardens.

== Notable streets and buildings ==
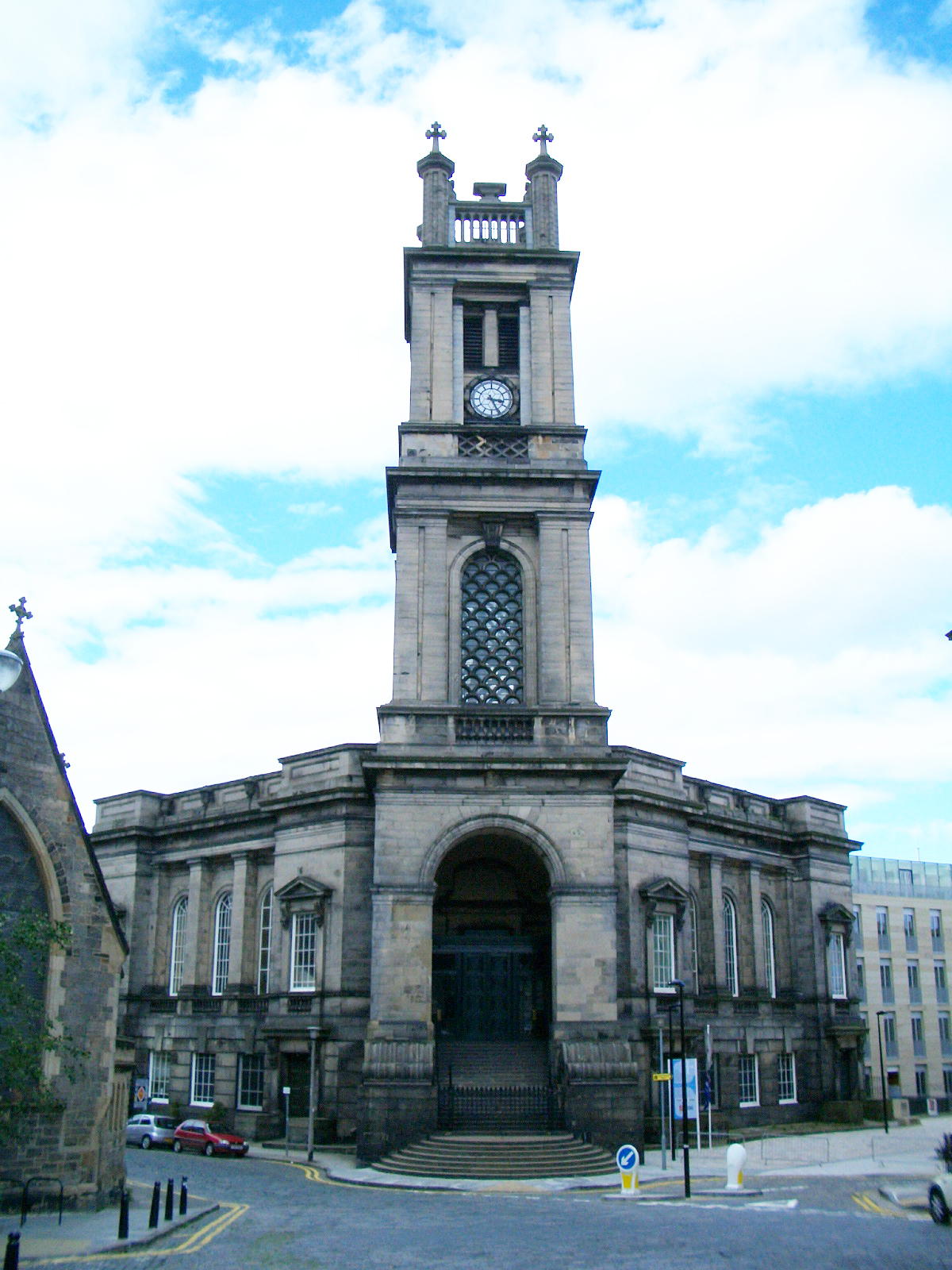
St. Stephen's Church

The eastern route into Stockbridge is marked by the local landmark, St Stephen's Church. This stands at the north end of St Vincent Street, its tower visible from the first New Town on the higher slope to the south. Originally intended to stand in the centre of Circus Place, it was redesigned and squeezed into its current restricted site on ground which falls sharply at the southern edge of the Silvermills area. It was designed by the architect William Playfair in 1827. It is unusual for its main church being raised by a storey, accessed by a tall but relatively narrow flight of steps at its frontage. Its clock pendulum is the longest in Europe. It is now a theatre and performance venue.

The church stands at the eastern end of St Stephen Street, a curving Georgian street of inhabited basement flats with ground floors accommodating a series of antique shops, bars and offices. A small spur on its north side, St Stephen Place, leads to the old Stockbridge Market, of which the original entrance archway still stands. Opposite St Stephen's is St Vincent's Episcopal Church.

Parallel to St Stephen Street, to the south, lies Circus Lane, a mews lane, integrating both old and new buildings. Circus Lane was once used as a service street to keep coaches and horses.

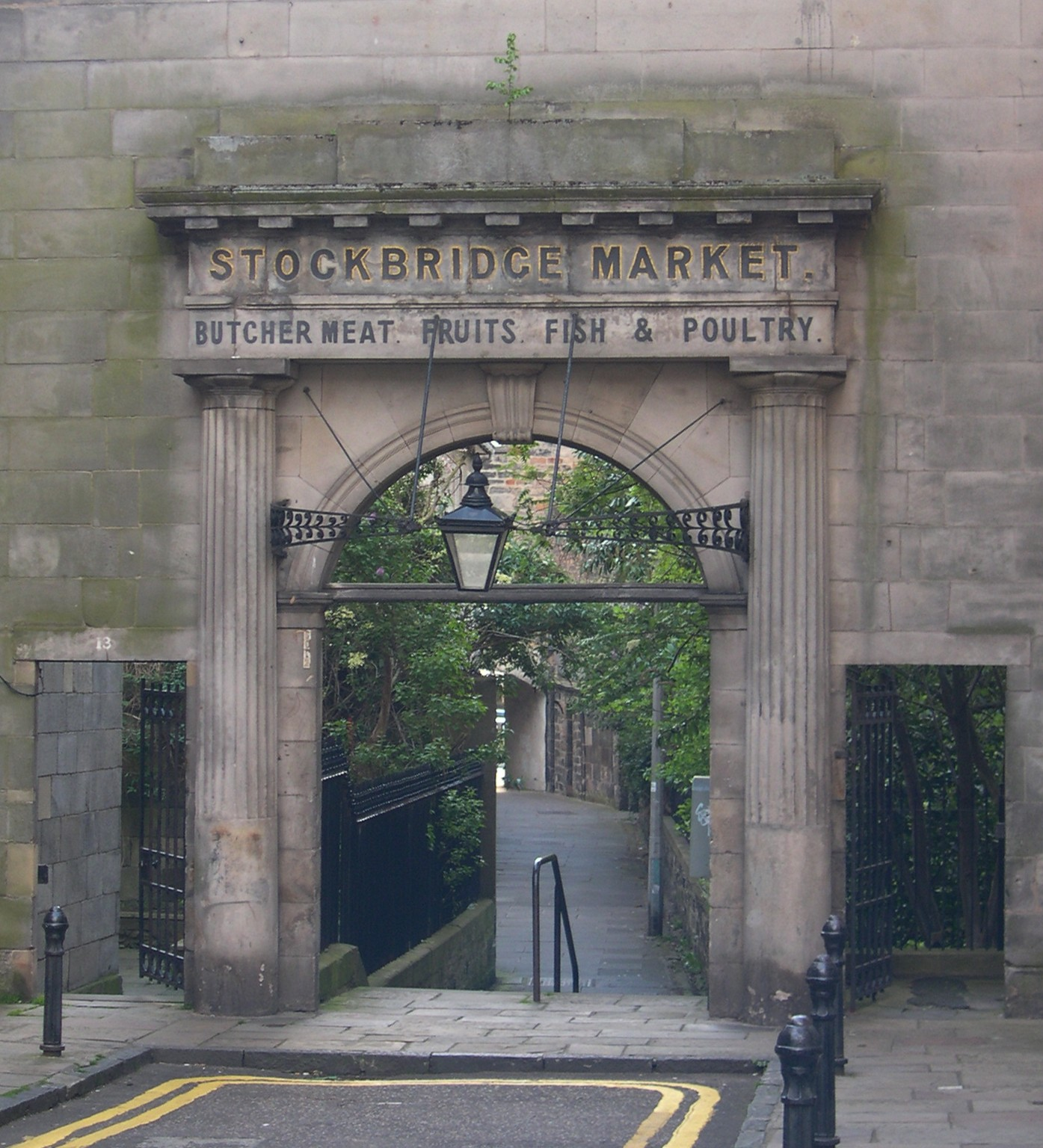
Stockbridge Market

The main road through Stockbridge is Raeburn Place, a street of mixed character, with numerous small shops at ground-floor level. The link from this street to the New Town is via Deanhaugh Street and North West Circus Place.

Saunders Street, south of the bridge, was built in 1974 as part of a slum clearance programme. The medical centre to its east is part of the same scheme.

Gloucester Lane marks the line of the medieval road from the village to St Cuthbert's Church at the west end of Princes Street. One building close to the Stockbridge end, predates the New Town. It is a merchant's house built about 1790 from the stones of demolished buildings in the Old Town and was the birthplace of the painter David Roberts, who worked as a scene painter at Edinburgh's Theatre Royal and later London's Covent Garden.

Leslie Place, dating from the late Victorian period, joins the village to the western sections of the New Town: St Bernards Crescent; Carlton Street; Danube Street, Ann Street and Dean Terrace. To the north of this is a less formal area of narrower streets: Dean Street; Cheyne Street; Raeburn Street and Dean Park Street.

The north-eastern route out of the area, towards Leith, runs along Hamilton Place. Dean Bank spurs off this road, running alongside the Water of Leith. Hamilton Place holds both the local library (1898) and primary school (1874). Saxe Coburg Street, a small Georgian cul-de-sac just to the north, leads to the small and bow-ended square of Saxe Coburg Place. This formal space was never completed due to ground level problems and Glenogle Baths (1898)

To the north, St Bernard's Row leads out past another little Georgian cul-de-sac, Malta Terrace, to Inverleith and the Botanic Gardens.

=== The Colonies ===
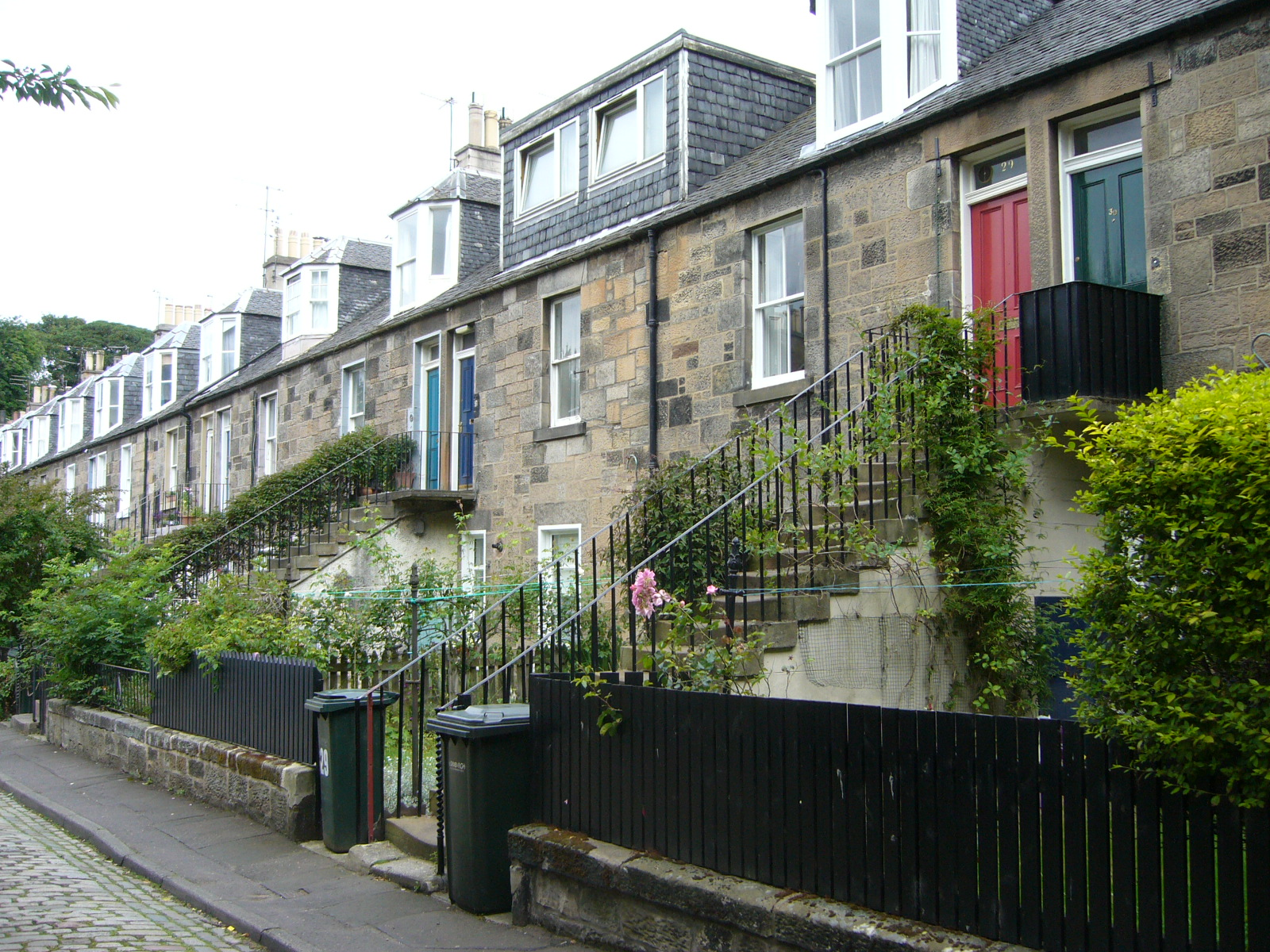
One of the Colonies

Between Glenogle Road and the Water of Leith are twelve parallel streets, collectively known as the "Stockbridge Colonies", built between 1861 and 1911 by the Edinburgh Co-operative Building Company to provide low-cost housing for the artisan class. The streets are named after the company's founders, including geologist and writer Hugh Miller (1802–56). The colony houses are now coveted properties, due partly to their location near the Royal Botanic Garden and Inverleith Park, and ease of access to the city centre.

=== St Bernard's Well ===
This mineral water well is on the south bank of the Water of Leith, on an estate once known as St Bernard's. Just below a footpath is St Bernard's Well (55°57′19.1″N 3°12′41.4″W); a small well-house was originally built in 1760. The waters of the well were held in high repute for their medicinal qualities, and the nobility and gentry took summer quarters in the valley to drink deep draughts of the water and take the country air.

In 1788 Lord Gardenstone, a wealthy Court of Session law lord, who thought he had benefited from the mineral spring, commissioned Alexander Nasmyth to design a new pump room and ornate structure over. The builder John Wilson began work in 1789. It is in the shape of a circular Greek temple supported by ten tall Doric order columns, based on Sibyl's Temple at Tivoli. The original statue (made of Coade Stone) was all but unrecognisable by 1820 and the temple stood for 50 years with no statue.

St Bernard's F.C., a once successful Scottish team but now defunct were named after the famous well and played in Stockbridge. The mosaic interior is by Thomas Bonnar.

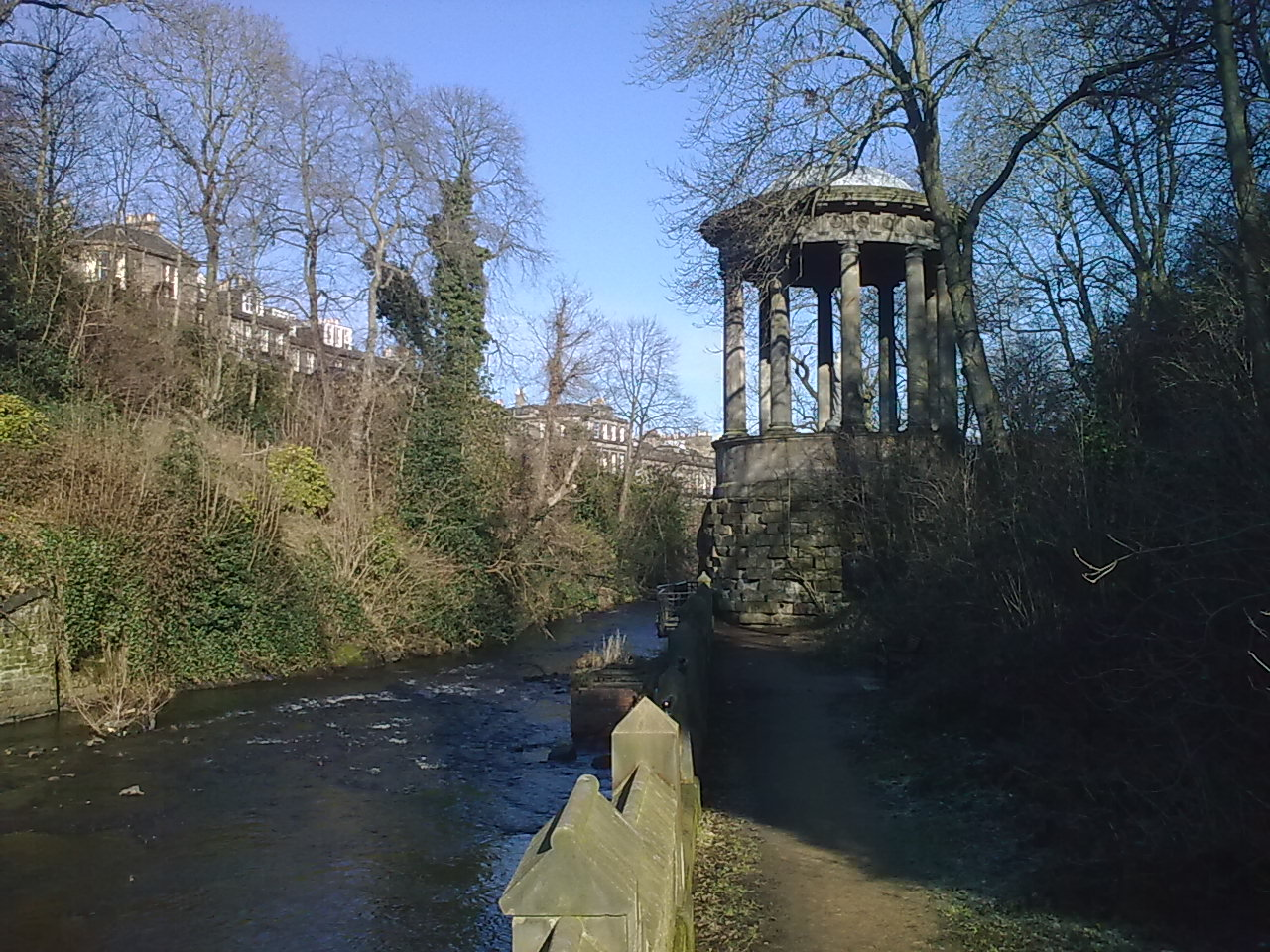
St Bernard's Well in 2010

The superiority of much of the St Bernard's estate was purchased in the 1790s by Sir Henry Raeburn, who almost immediately began selling it off by feu charters, although he continued to live in St. Bernard's House until his death in 1823. (The house was demolished in 1826 to make way for the east side of Carlton Street.)

In the opening years of the 19th century George Lauder of Inverleith Mains also acquired parts of these lands as evidenced by a charter whereby "Henry Raeburn, as retoured heir to Sir Henry Raeburn, Knight, Portrait Painter, Edinburgh, his father, was seised on the 19 March 1824 in a piece of ground for the purpose of making a communication by a stone bridge across the Water of Leith from the New Street called Atholl Street, now India Place, to the grounds of St Bernards, parish of St Cuthberts, which piece of ground had previously been sold by George Lauder residing at Inverleith Mains, to the said (deceased) Sir Henry Raeburn on 28 June 1823". Doubtless it was thought that this new bridge (built the following year by James Milne, and today known as St. Bernard's Bridge) would assist in making those so far undeveloped parts of Stockbridge, and the Raeburn lands, attractive to developers. George Lauder, the great-grandfather of Sir Harry Lauder, had also purchased St. Bernard's Well and surrounding land in April 1812 from Francis Garden Campbell of Troup & Glenlyon. His eldest surviving son is described in the Edinburgh Annual Post Office Directories as "William Lauder of St.Bernards Well, farmer" until his death in nearby Saunders Street in 1858. He was buried in Dean Cemetery.

In 1884 St. Bernard's Well was purchased and presented to his fellow Edinburgh townsmen by the publisher William Nelson, after it had been restored and redecorated by Thomas Bonnar, with a new statue of Hygieia, carved by David Watson Stevenson. Dean Terrace and Ann Street today overlook the valley and Well. The well closed to the public in the 1940s, but was restored in 2013 and is now maintained by the City of Edinburgh Council and open to the public for three hours on occasional Sundays during April to September.

=== Notable buildings ===
Madame Doubtfire was a shop in Stockbridge owned by Annabella Coutts, who named it after her first husband, Arthur Cyril Doubtfire. It was a run-down second-hand clothes shop which occupied for many years a basement area in South East Circus Place, now Frame Creative, a design agency, and the Doubtfire Gallery. The name "Madame Doubtfire" remained in large, bold, faded-gold letters on the ageing shop fascia for many years after the lady's death (in 1979 aged 92). The novelist Anne Fine lived in the area at the time and was, apparently, fascinated by the name. She used it for her novel Madame Doubtfire which was turned into the film, though the Robin Williams character Mrs. Doubtfire bears no resemblance to the Stockbridge original. Madame Doubtfire's favourite saying was "walls have ears".

One of Scotland's best known brothels was located in Danube Street, Stockbridge. Dora Noyce (1900–1977), the proprietor for about thirty years after the Second World War, was fined 47 times for living off immoral earnings. She is remembered as a local legend, and was also a good friend of Madame Doubtfire.

== Governance ==
The area is covered by Stockbridge and Inverleith Community Council as well as the City of Edinburgh Council.

Stockbridge is located in the Edinburgh North and Leith Westminster constituency, represented since 2024 by Tracy Gilbert of the Labour Party, and in the Edinburgh Northern Holyrood constituency, currently represented by Sanne Dijkstra-Downie of the Scottish Liberal Democrats.

== Culture and sport ==
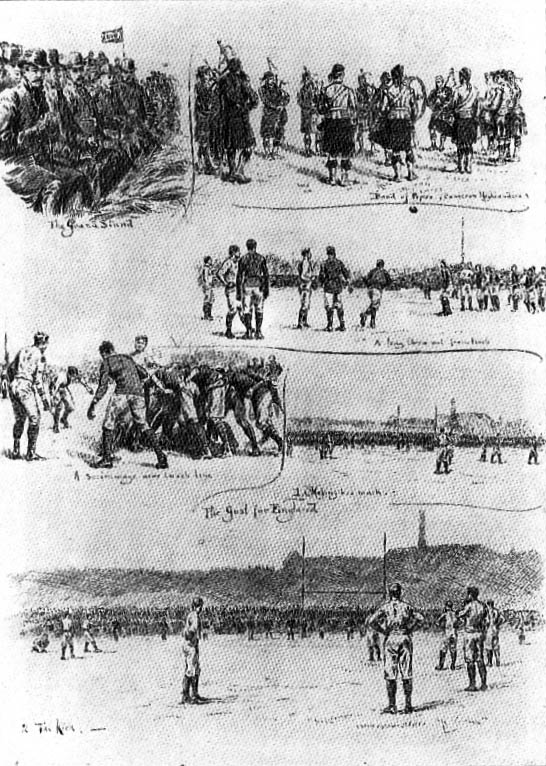
The first ever rugby international (Calcutta Cup match), Raeburn Place, Edinburgh, 1890

Raeburn Place is the main retail thoroughfare, and the playing fields there were the location of the first international rugby match when the Edinburgh Academy sports ground hosted the game between Scotland and England on 27 March 1871.

Stockbridge contains speciality shops including a cheese shop as well as many charity shops (some of which are among the highest grossing in the UK). The Bailie Bar pub is mentioned in various pub and tourist guides. There is a popular farmers' market each Sunday at Jubilee Gardens, close to the Water of Leith.

The Edinburgh Academy's sports grounds are adjacent to The Grange Club, which is home turf of the Scottish cricket team. The venue hosted two fixtures of the 1999 Cricket World Cup. St Bernard's F.C. were a successful side but suffered declining support in the face of Hearts and Hibs.

The neighbourhood is also home to the Stockbridge Pipe Band, founded in 1994. Currently fielding competition bands in Grade 4B and Grade 3A of the Royal Scottish Pipe Band Association, the band teaches the arts of piping, snare, tenor and bass drumming to all ages.

Each year Stockbridge hosts a community festival, normally lasting 9 days at the end of June. Since 1988, the festival has held the Stockbridge Duck Race to raise money for local charities. 1000 rubber ducks are released into the Water of Leith. Each has a number written on its head and the first ducks past the winning line win prizes for their sponsors. "Duck Wardens" follow the ducks to keep them out of the reeds and to stop children spectating from falling into the river. Hundreds of people turn out every year to cheer for their duck.

The community council which covers Stockbridge is Stockbridge and Inverleith Community Council (also covering Comely Bank).

=== Academy of Urbanism awards ===
The success of Stockbridge as an urban environment led to the area being shortlisted by The Academy of Urbanism for the award 'Great Neighbourhood of the Year: 2009'. On 15 May 2008, Stockbridge was chosen from a selection of 10 neighbourhoods to proceed as one of the three finalists.

=== Notable residents ===
Notable Stockbridge residents have included:

- Stéphane Adam, footballer, Heart of Midlothian FC
- Aly Bain, Shetland fiddle player
- Andrew Crichton (1790–1855) lived at 33 St Bernard's Crescent
- Graham Crowden, actor
- James Graham Fairley, architect, lived and worked from 21 Rintoul Place
- John Faed artist (and for some time his sister Susan Faed)
- Rose Frain, artist
- Peter Higgs, physicist
- James Hogg (1770–1835), poet and novelist, rented rooms on Deanhaugh Street in 1813
- George Meikle Kemp (1795–1844) architect of the Scott Monument lived at 28 Bedford Street (demolished in 1970s)
- John Lessels (1809–1883), Scottish architect and artist, lived at 3 St Bernard's Row (now demolished)
- Norman Lovett, actor
- Edwin G Lucas (1911–1990), artist
- Prof Donald Mainland (1902–1985) medical statistician
- Shirley Manson, musician
- James Clerk Maxwell, physicist and mathematician, was born at 14 India Street.
- Leslie Benzies, video game producer and Rockstar North president
- Horatio McCulloch (1805–67), landscape artist lived at 7 Danube Street
- Kenneth MacLeay (1802–1878), artist and co-founder of the Royal Scottish Academy lived and died at 3 Malta Terrace
- Dylan Moran, comedian, actor, writer
- Nico, (1938–1988) musician, Warhol superstar
- Thomas de Quincey (1785–1859), intellectual
- Sir Henry Raeburn (1756–1823), portrait artist
- Leitch Ritchie (1800–1865) lived on St Bernards Crescent
- William Thomas Ritchie FRSE (1873–1945) born and raised here
- David Roberts (1796–1864), artist, lived at Duncan's Land, (now 8 Gloucester Street)
- Caleb Saleeby lived his youth at 3 Malta, was an English physician, writer, and journalist known for his support of eugenics.
- David Scott (1806–1849), artist, lived at 5 Marys Place
- Graham Hall (1966–1997) musician
- Sir James Young Simpson (1811–1870), lived at various Stockbridge addresses: 1 Raeburn Place (whilst a student), 2 Deanhaugh Street, and 1 Dean Terrace
- James Stewart (1791–1863), engraver, lived at 4 Hermitage Place (street renamed Raeburn Street in the 1970s due to name duplication when Edinburgh took over Leith)
- Aeneas Francon Williams (1886–1971), a Church of Scotland missionary in India and China, a writer and a poet, lived at 10 Carlton Street in his later years, and is buried at Dean Cemetery

== Film location ==
Because of its picturesque qualities, Stockbridge has often been used as a location in film and television dramas.

For example: – Mary Reilly; North & South; Women Talking Dirty (directed by Coky Giedroyc); Rebus; Prime of Miss Jean Brodie.
