= James Stewart (engraver) =

Scottish engraver and painter (1791–1863)

- Born: James Struthers Stewart; 2 November 1791; Edinburgh, Scotland
- Died: 5 February 1863 (aged 71); Alice, South Africa

James Stewart (2 November 1791 – 5 February 1863) was a Scottish engraver and painter.

== Life ==
He was born at Edinburgh on 2 November 1791. He was articled to Robert Scott the engraver, and had as his helpful fellow pupil John Burnet. He also studied drawing in the Trustees' Academy. On the foundation of the Royal Scottish Academy in 1826 he became an original member. In Edinburgh he lived at 4 Hermitage Place, a narrow street in Stockbridge renamed Raeburn Street in 1922 following Edinburgh absorbing Leith in 1920 which already had a Hermitage Place.

In 1830 Stewart moved to London. In 1833 he was induced by financial troubles to emigrate to Cape Colony; there he settled as a farmer, but within a year lost everything through the outbreak of the Sixth Xhosa War. He then went to reside in the town of Somerset East. Teaching and painting portraits, he earned enough to purchase another property. He subsequently became a magistrate and a member of the legislature, and died in the colony in May 1863.

== Works ==
Stewart's first independent plate was from Sir William Allan's Tartar Robbers dividing the Spoil,’ which was followed by Circassian Captives (1820); The Murder of Archbishop Sharpe, (1824); and Queen Mary signing her Abdication, all from paintings by Allan. He then became associated with David Wilkie, for whom he executed, with other works, a plate of The Penny Wedding.

In London he engraved The Pedlar, after Wilkie, and Hide and Seek, from a picture painted by himself in the style of Wilkie, which was exhibited at the British Institution in 1829.
