= Robert Scott (engraver) =

Scottish engraver (1777–1841)

Robert Scott (13 November 1777 – 1841) was a Scottish engraver.

== Life ==
The son of Grizell and Robert Scott, he was born on 13 November 1777 at Lanark, where his father was a skinner. He attended the grammar school at Musselburgh, and at the age of ten was articled to Andrew Robertson, an engraver at Edinburgh; there he also worked in the Trustees' Academy. Among his pupils were John Burnet, John Horsburgh, and James Stewart. He died early in 1841 in Edinburgh.

== Works ==
Scott first became known for some plates in James Anderson of Hermiston's The Bee for 1793 and 1794, and a set of Views of Seats and Scenery chiefly in the Environs of Edinburgh, from drawings by Alexander Carse and Andrew Wilson, published in 1795 and 1796. He made the most of his abilities, and was known in his day for his small book illustrations; he carried on a manufactory in Parliament Stairs, Edinburgh, employing many assistants.

Scott's most significant work was in landscape. He engraved the illustrations to George Barry's History of the Orkney Islands, 1805, and to Scenery of Allan Ramsay's Gentle Shepherd, 1808; he contributed plates for many years to the Scots Magazine, and put in the landscape backgrounds of some of those for John Bell's Poets of Great Britain.

He was employed by Henry Mozley, publisher at Gainsborough (the father of Thomas Mozley and James Bowling Mozley), for whose edition of James Thomson's The Seasons (1804), he engraved four plates after John Burnet. Scott's last work was a set of 20 views of ‘Scenery of Edinburgh and Midlothian,’ 1838, from drawings by his son, William Bell Scott.

By his final years he had obtained a prestigious studio at 65 Princes Street and was living at 15 Lauriston Street in the Tollcross area of Edinburgh. Both buildings are now demolished.

== Family ==
On 29 March 1800 Scott married Ross Bell, the daughter of Robert Bell, a Musselburgh mason. Together they had two sons, David Scott and William Bell Scott, who both became artists.
