= Stockbridge public library =

Library in Edinburgh, Scotland

Coordinates: 55.959°N 3.2078°W

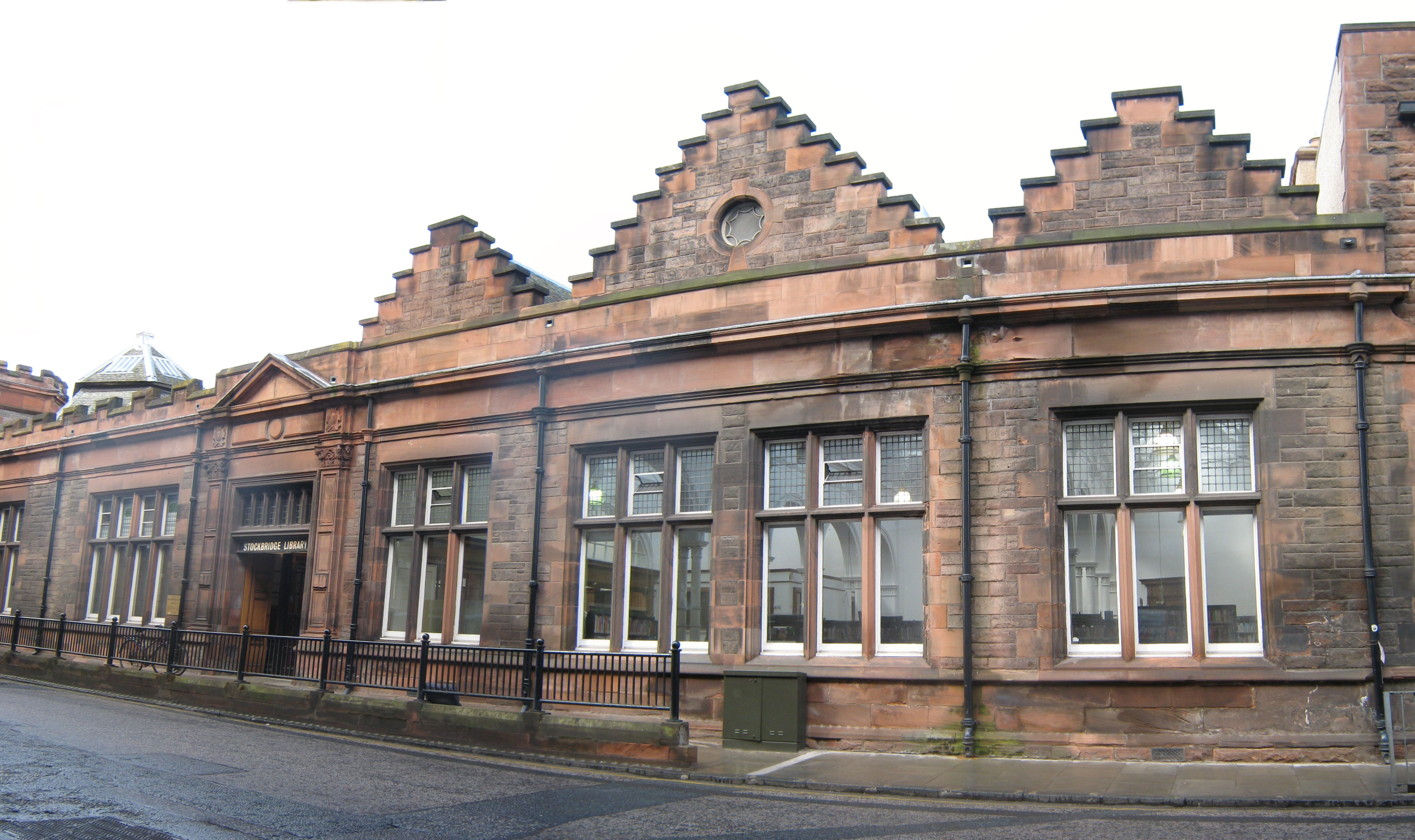
Stockbridge library

Stockbridge public library, built in 1898, is one of Edinburgh's 28 freely accessible libraries, located in the Stockbridge area of the city.

The library is currently open six days a week and, in addition to the collection of books, provides "bookbug" sessions for the under-fives, a knitting club and acts as one of the city's business hubs

As with all of the city's libraries, Stockbridge library uses the Library of Congress Classification system for its adult collection. Since 1974, when Wigan dropped the classification system, Edinburgh is the only area in the UK where public libraries use the US classification scheme. Children's books, and some non-English works, are indexed using the Dewey Decimal Classification scheme.
