= Penkill Castle =

Castle in South Ayrshire, Scotland

Coordinates: 55.2492°N 4.7837°W

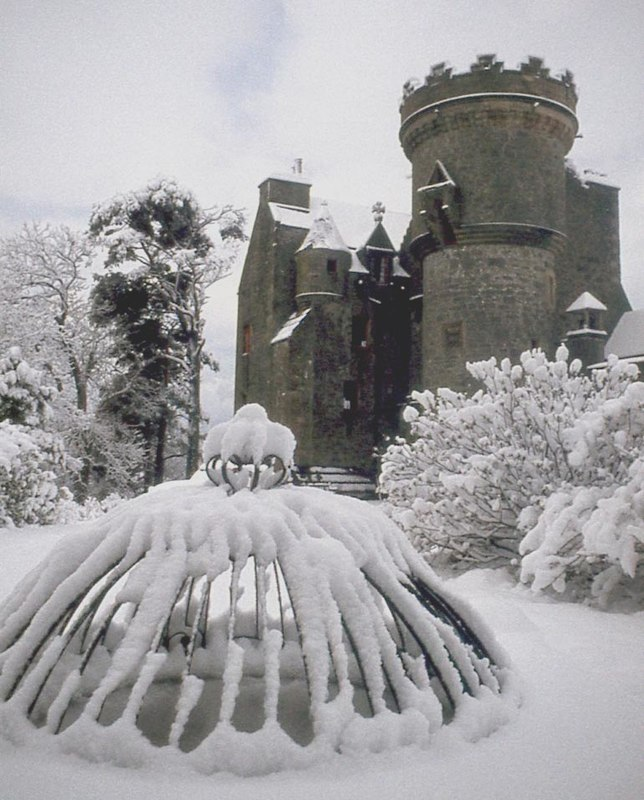
Penkill Castle with the well in the foreground

Penkill Castle is a 16th-century castle with later additions. It is around 1/2 mile (800 metres) south of Old Dailly, northeast of Girvan in south Ayrshire, Scotland.

== History ==
The 16th-century tower was built by a branch of the Boyd family, relatives of the Earls of Kilmarnock, and extended several times. The original 16th-century square three-storey tower was extended in the 17th century to create an L-shaped building. The castle later fell into decline, becoming near ruinous by the early 19th century. Starting in 1857, the site was drastically restored and a modern wing added on the east.

The castle owner has been known as the Laird of Penkill, starting in the 16th century with Adam Boyd, 1st Laird of Penkill. The lairds were all men until the 14th Laird, the artist Alice Boyd, in the late 19th century. She is credited with extending the original castle grounds after she became laird.

The 16th Laird of Penkill, Evelyn May Courtney-Boyd, was also the last; she sold Penkill Castle in the 1980s. It was bought by an American lawyer, Elton Eckstrand, who further restored it. In 1992 Penkill was sold by Eckstrand to Scots-born Canadian businessman Don Brown, then subsequently in 1993 to the then HTV Wales chairman and TV producer and director Patrick Dromgoole, and thus remains in private hands.

Penkill Castle played a minor part in the history of the British Pre-Raphaelite movement. In the late 1850s, the Pre-Raphaelite artist William Bell Scott began a liaison with Alice Boyd, whose brother was then the laird. Scott visited Penkill often and on one occasion painted a series of murals illustrating James I's poem The Kingis Quair in the staircase. Scott died at Penkill on 22 November 1890.

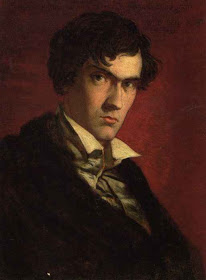
William Bell Scott by Arthur Hughes

The castle was frequented by other Pre-Raphaelite artists and writers, including Christina Rossetti, who wrote of it: "Even Naples in imagination cannot efface the quiet fertile comeliness of Penkill in reality."
