= John Horsburgh =

Scottish engraver (1791–1869)

John Horsburgh (1791 – 24 September 1869) was a Scottish engraver.

== Life ==
Born at Prestonpans, near Edinburgh, he was left an orphan early, and studied drawing at the Trustees' Academy. At the age of 14 he was apprenticed to Robert Scott the engraver, and worked under him for some years.

In the 1830s he is listed as living at 5 Archibald Place on the south side of Edinburgh.

At the age of about sixty Horsburgh retired from active work, and undertook gratuitously the duties of pastor in the Scottish Baptist church. He died at 16 Buccleuch Place, Edinburgh, on 24 September 1869.

His son John A. Horsburgh (1835– 1924) was also an artist.

== Works ==
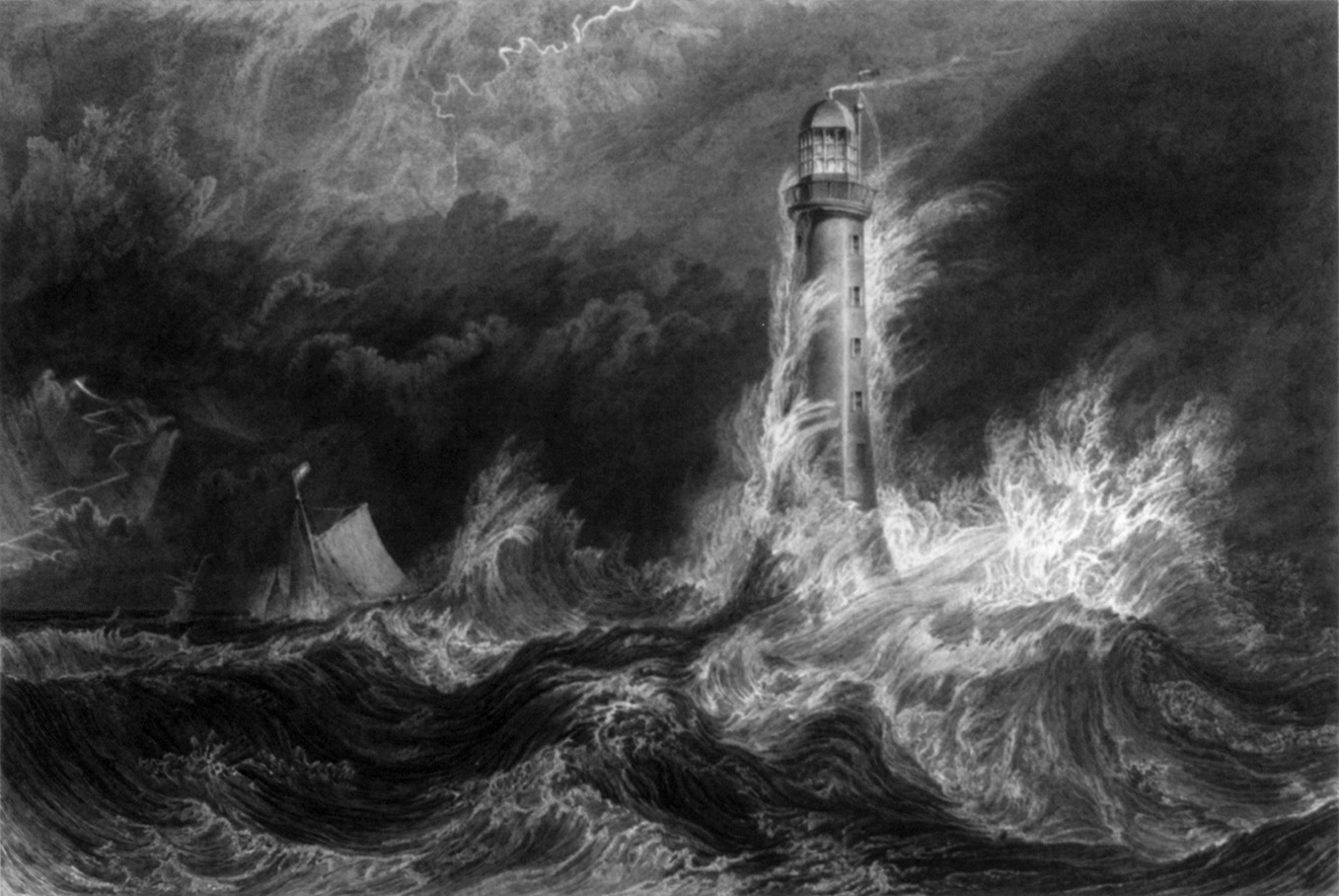
Engraving of J. M. W. Turner artwork of the Bell Rock Lighthouse, 1824

Horsburgh engraved plates after J. M. W. Turner, for England and Wales, William Bernard Cooke's Southern Coast of England, and Walter Scott's works, and other publications. He engraved several single plates, including Prince Charlie reading a Despatch, after William Simson, Sir Walter Scott, after Sir Thomas Lawrence, and another portrait of Scott after John Watson Gordon. His pastoral addresses were published with a short memoir prefixed immediately after his death.
