= William Bell Scott =

Scottish artist (1811–1890)

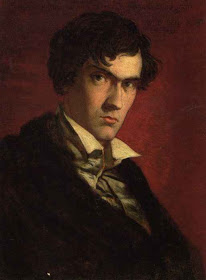
- William Bell Scott by Arthur Hughes
- Born: 12 September 1811; Edinburgh, Scotland
- Died: 22 November 1890 (aged 79); Penkill Castle, Scotland

William Bell Scott (12 September 1811 – 22 November 1890) was a Scottish artist in oils and watercolour and occasionally printmaking. He was also a poet and art teacher, and his posthumously published reminiscences give a chatty and often vivid picture of life in the circle of the Pre-Raphaelites; he was especially close to Dante Gabriel Rossetti. After growing up in Edinburgh, he moved to London, and from 1843 to 1864 was principal of the government School of Art in Newcastle upon Tyne, where he added industrial subjects to his repertoire of landscapes and history painting. He was one of the first British artists to extensively depict the processes of the Industrial Revolution. He returned to London, working for the Science and Art Department until 1885.

He painted a cycle of historical subjects mixed with scenes from modern industry for Wallington Hall in Northumberland (now National Trust), his best known works, and a purely historical cycle for Penkill Castle in Ayrshire in Scotland.

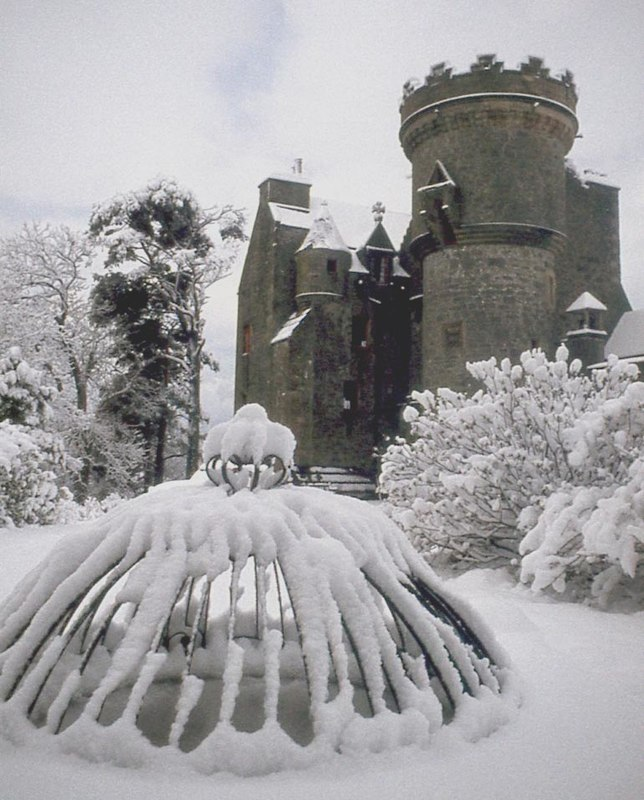
Penkill Castle

He did not paint many portraits, but his striking portrait of his friend Algernon Charles Swinburne is the iconic image of the poet. His etchings were mostly designed to illustrate his books.

== Life ==
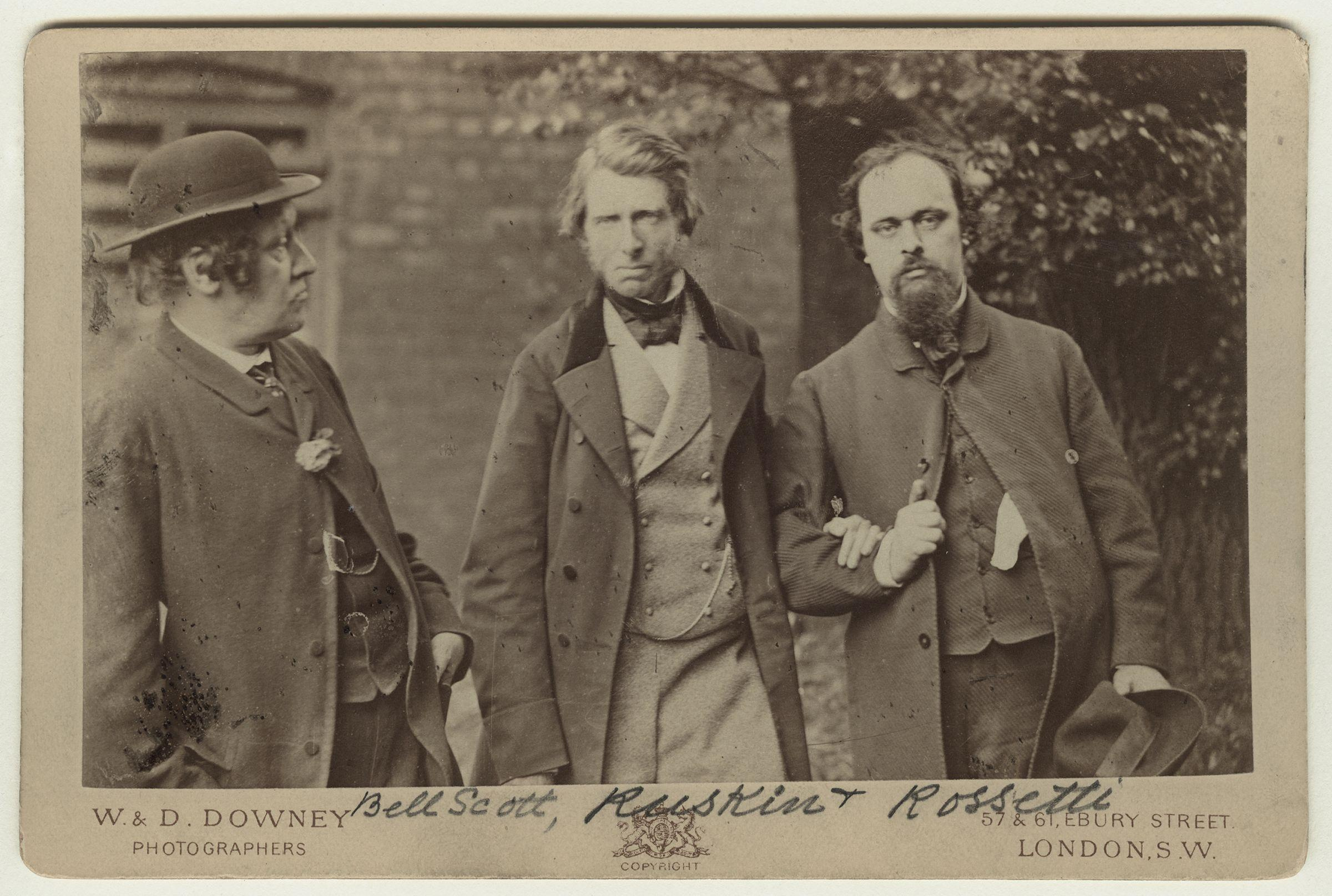
William Bell Scott; John Ruskin and Dante Gabriel Rossetti by William Downey, 1863

The son of Robert Scott (1777–1841), the engraver, and brother of David Scott, the painter, he was born in Edinburgh. While a young man he studied art and assisted his father, and he published verses in the Scottish magazines.

In 1837, Scott went to London. There he became sufficiently well known as an artist to be appointed in 1844 master of the government school of design at Newcastle-on-Tyne. He held the post for twenty years, and did work in organizing art-teaching and examining under the Science and Art Department. In Newcastle, Scott was visited by all the Rossetti family, and Dante Gabriel Rossetti painted Maria Leathart's portrait at Scott's house 14 St Thomas' Crescent (plaque erected 2005). Algernon Charles Swinburne, who wrote two poems to Scott, spent much time with him in Newcastle after being sent down from Oxford.

After 1870 Scott was much in London, where he bought a house in Chelsea, and he was an intimate friend of Dante Gabriel Rossetti and in high repute as an artist and an author. He was, however, at daggers drawn with John Ruskin.

He resigned his appointment under the Science and Art Department in 1885, and from then until his death he was mainly occupied in writing his reminiscences, Autobiographical Notes, which were published posthumously in 1892, with a memoir by Professor Minto. It is for his connection with Rossetti's circle that Bell Scott will be chiefly remembered.

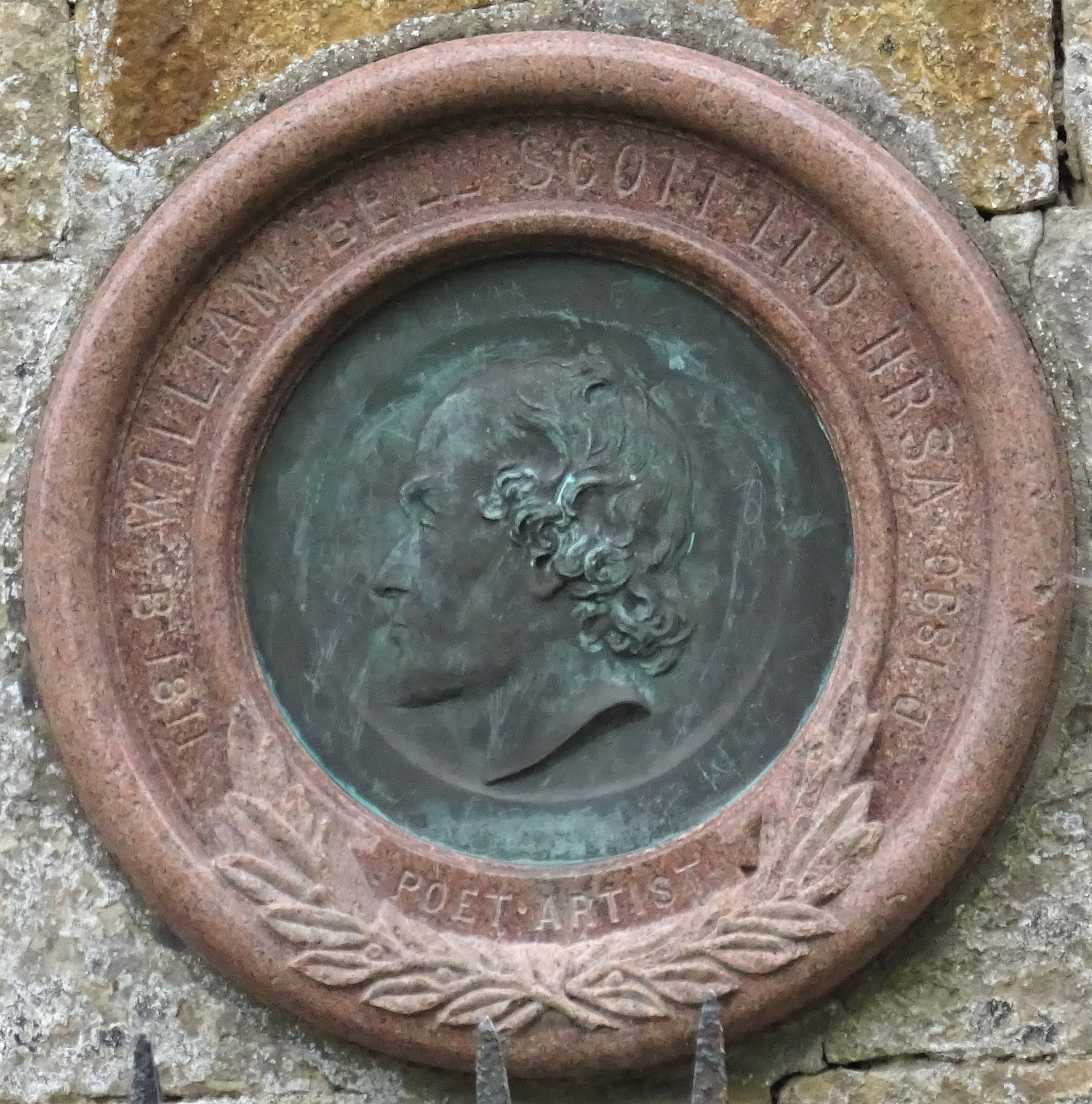
The memorial plaque on the wall above his grave at the Boyds of Penkill burial ground, Old Dailly Kirk, Ayrshire, Scotland.

== Artwork ==
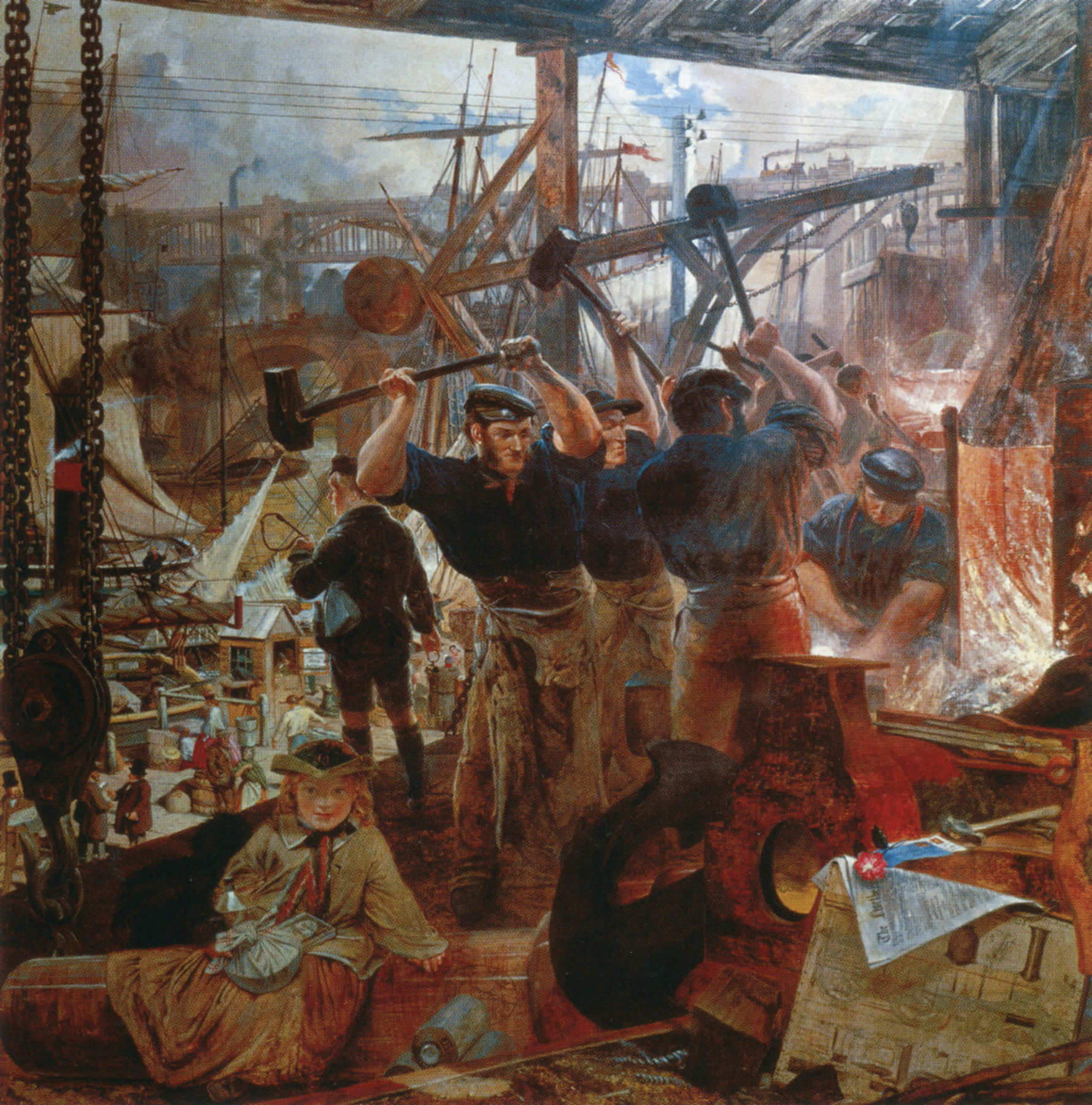
William Bell Scott Iron and Coal. 1855–60. National Trust, Wallington, Northumberland

In addition to oil paintings, Bell Scott did much decorative work, notably at Wallington Hall. There Pauline, Lady Trevelyan commissioned him, after coming across his 1850 Memoir of his brother David Scott. He produced eight large pictures illustrating Northumbrian history, with life-size figures, supplemented by eighteen pictures on The Ballad of Chevy Chase in the spandrels of the arches of the hall. For Penkill Castle he executed a similar series, illustrating James I's poem The Kingis Quair.

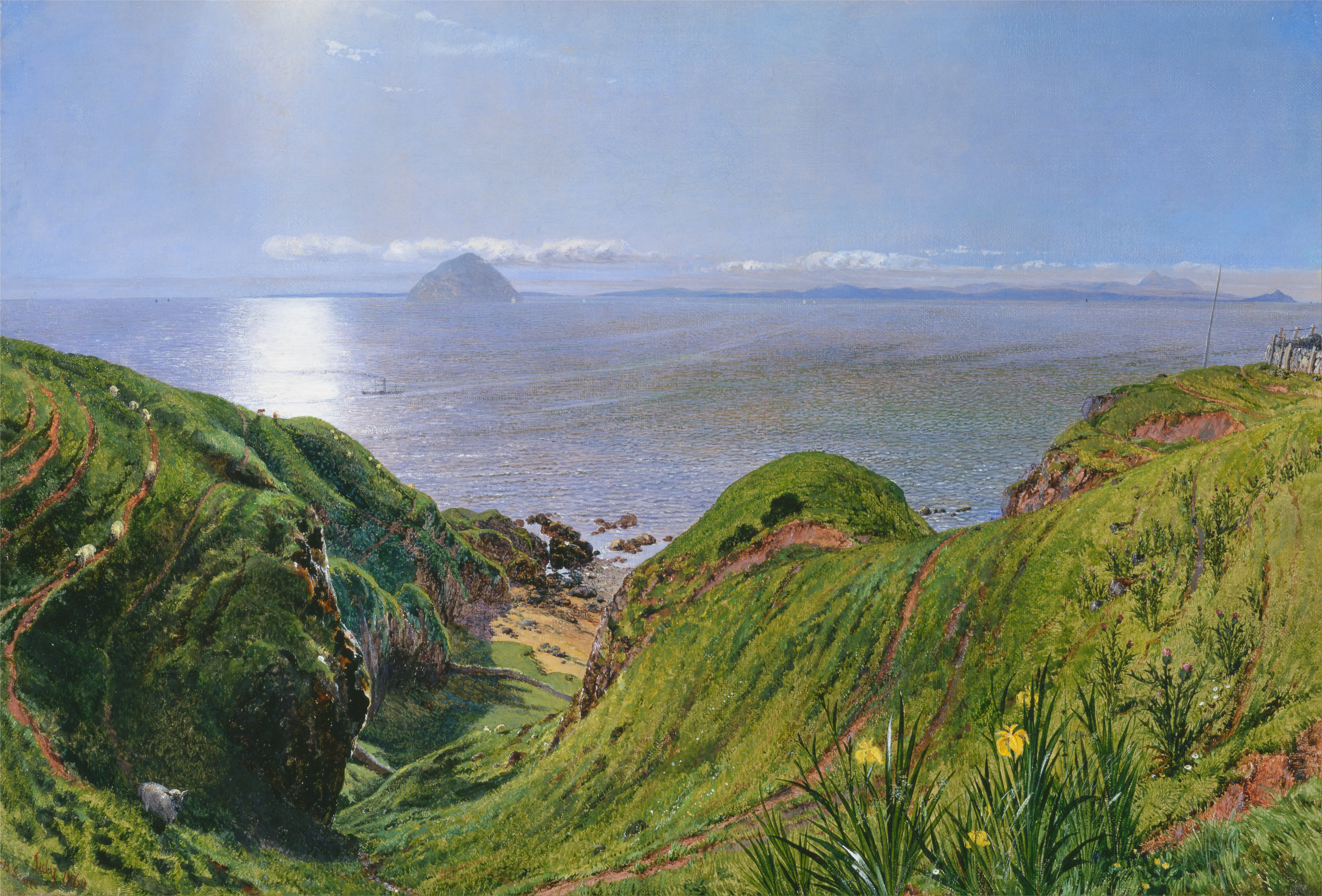
Ailsa Craig by William Bell Scott (Yale Center for British Art)

== Writings ==
Scott's poetry, which he published at intervals (notably Poems, 1875, illustrated by etchings by himself and Alma-Tadema), recalled William Blake and Percy Bysshe Shelley, and was considerably influenced by Rossetti. He also wrote artistic and literary criticism, and edited John Keats, Letitia Elizabeth Landon, Lord Byron, Samuel Taylor Coleridge, Shelley, William Shakespeare and Sir Walter Scott.

== Family ==
In 1839 Scott married Letitia Margery Norquoy (1813–1898); the marriage was childless. In Newcastle he had as a pupil Alice Boyd, the sister of the then-laird of Penkill Castle in Scotland. In 1860, Bell Scott visited Penkill Castle and began a liaison with Alice that would last until his death at Penkill in 1890. Although unhappily married, Bell Scott refused to cause a scandal by leaving his wife, and a workable ménage à trois was established: Alice spent winters with William and Letitia in London, while they came to Penkill in the summers.
