= David Scott (painter) =

Scottish historical painter

Portrait of David Scott, circa 1848-1849, by Charles Lees

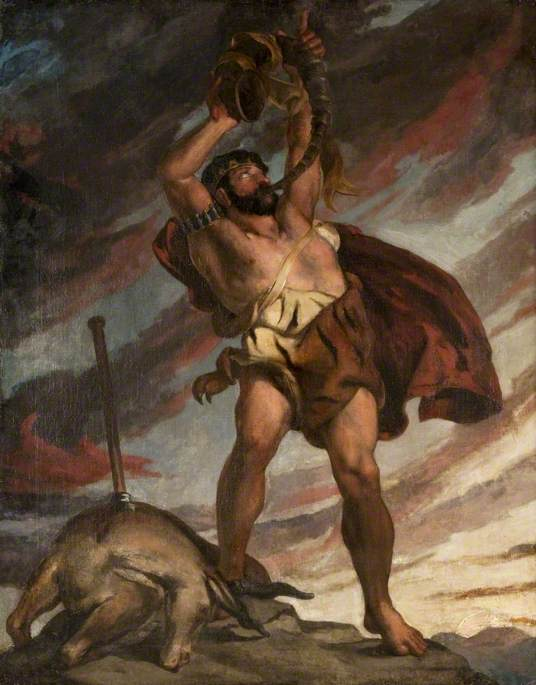
Nimrod by David Scott, 1832

David Scott (October 1806 – 5 March 1849) was a Scottish historical painter.

== Life ==
Scott was the brother of William Bell Scott. He was born at Parliament Steps, off Parliament Square in Edinburgh, where he attended the Royal High School, and studied art under his father, Robert Scott, the engraver.

In 1828 he exhibited his first oil picture, the "Hopes of Early Genius dispelled by Death," which was followed by "Cain, Nimrod, Adam and Eve singing their Morning Hymn," "Sarpedon carried by Sleep and Death," and other subjects of a poetic and imaginative character.

In 1829 he became a member of the Scottish Academy, and in 1832 visited Italy, where he spent more than a year in study. While in Rome he executed a large symbolical painting, entitled the "Agony of Discord, or the Household Gods Destroyed." The works of his later years include "Vasco da Gama encountering the Spirit of the Storm," a picture immense in size and most powerful in conception finished in 1842, and now preserved in the Trinity House, Leith; the "Duke of Gloucester entering the Water Gate of Calais" (1841); the "Alchemist" (1818), "Queen Elizabeth at the Globe Theatre" (1840) and "Peter the Hermit" (1845), remarkable for varied and elaborate character painting; and "Ariel and Caliban" (1837) and the "Triumph of Love" (1846), distinguished by beauty of colouring and depth of poetic feeling. The most important of his religious subjects are the "Descent from the Cross" (1835) and the "Crucifixion—the Dead Rising" (1844).

Scott also executed several remarkable series of designs. Two of these—the "Monograms of Man" and the illustrations to Coleridge's Ancient Mariner—were etched by his own hand, and published in 1831 and 1837 respectively, while his subjects from The Pilgrim's Progress and Nichol's Architecture of the Heavens were issued after his death.

Scott lived at 5 Mary Place, part of Raeburn Place in Stockbridge, Edinburgh. He died at his studio in Easter Dalry House (which he had leased from 1845) in western Edinburgh (now called Orwell Place). He died of a long illness contracted in Italy. Scott was buried in Dean Cemetery, and a monument designed by his brother was set in 1860. The grave lies in the south-east section not far from the main entrance. It bears the motto "ars longa vita brevis": Art is long, life is short.

His main masterpiece is "Vasco de Gama at the Cape of Good Hope" which is held at Trinity House of Leith. In 1850 he created 40 illustrations for a new publication of The Pilgrim's Progress.

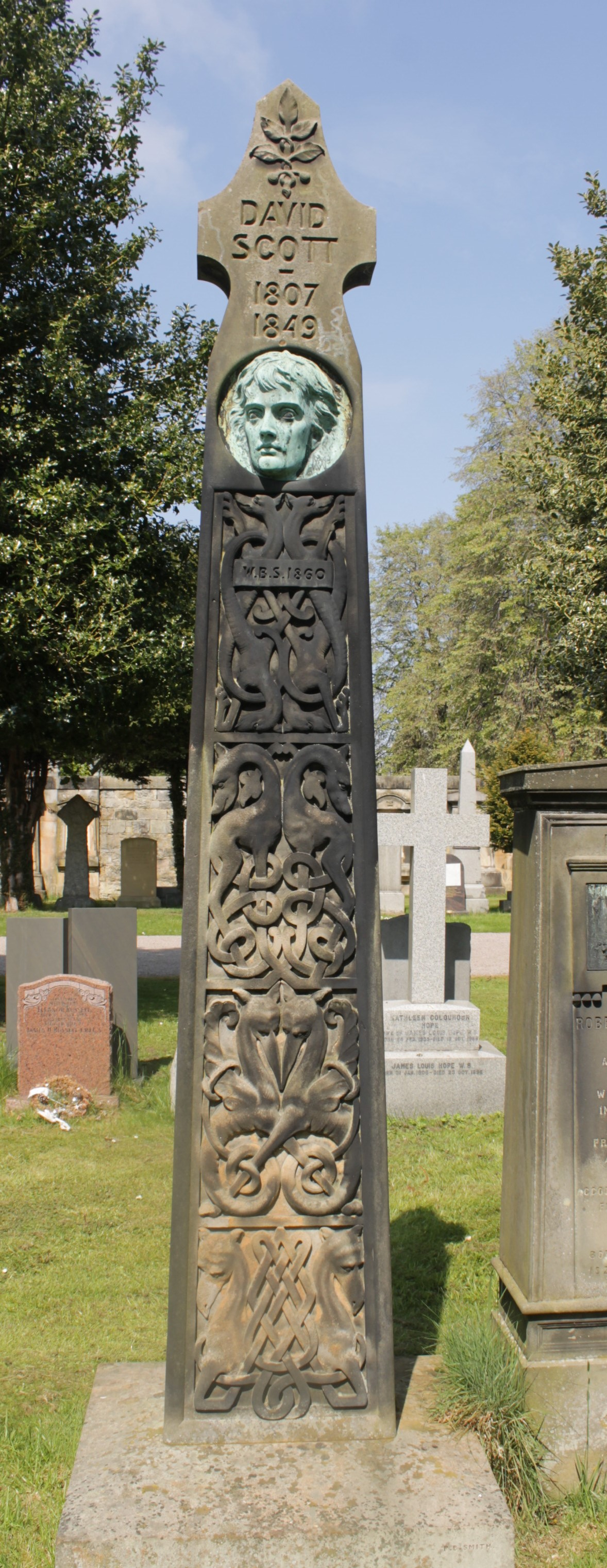
The grave of David Scott in Dean Cemetery

== Publications ==
Scott occasionally wrote for Blackwood's Magazine including "The Peculiarities of Thought and Style" (1839) and several articles on specific artists in 1840.

He created a pamphlet guide British, French and German Painting.
