= Southside, Edinburgh =

Area of Edinburgh, Scotland

Coordinates: 55.945614°N 3.1847215°W

Southside
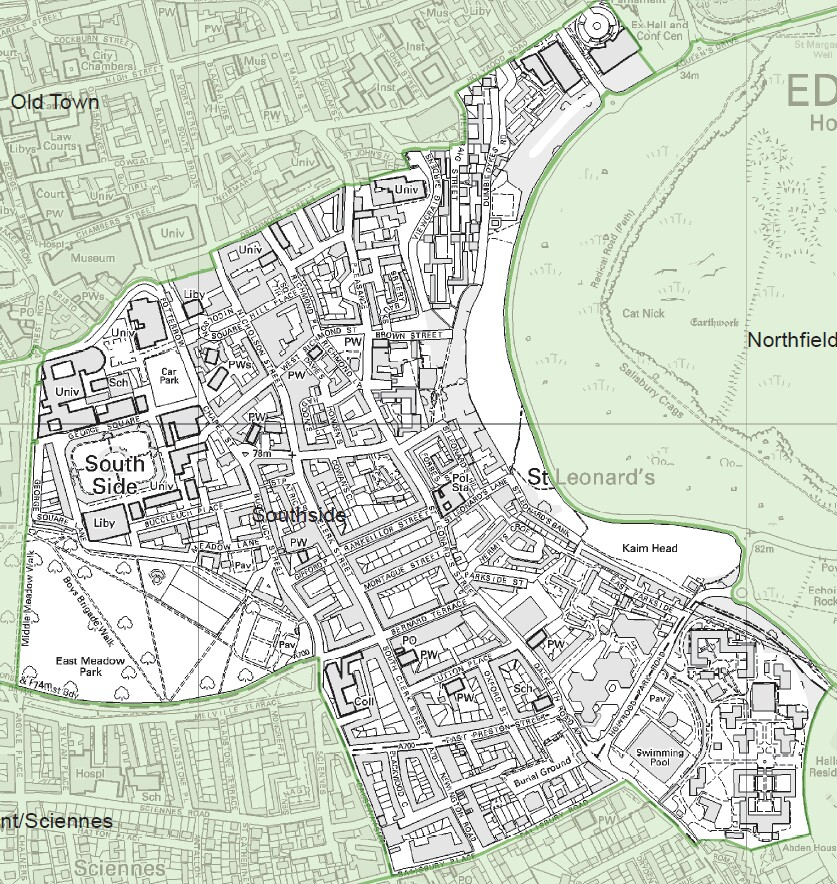
- Boundaries of the Southside area according to its Community Council

- Location within the City of Edinburgh council area Location within Scotland
- Population: 36,132
- Council area: City of Edinburgh
- Country: Scotland
- Sovereign state: United Kingdom
- Police: Scotland
- Fire: Scottish
- Ambulance: Scottish
- UK Parliament: Edinburgh East and Musselburgh
- Scottish Parliament: Edinburgh Central

The Southside is an area of Scotland's capital city, Edinburgh, located between its historic Old Town, Holyrood Park and the neighbourhood of Newington. The Southside housed much of Edinburgh's working class through the 150 years from 1800 to the early 1960s before planning decisions led to large-scale demolition to accommodate the expansion of the university and creation of new road systems, and resulted in the movement of families to public housing in new estates on the outskirts of the city. Demolition was halted due to changes in planning ideology which promoted redevelopment in its place.

In 1975 the Southside was designated by the City of Edinburgh Council as a conservation area, and in 1995 part of the Southside was included in the UNESCO World Heritage site of the Old Town.

== Geography ==
The north boundary is Holyrood Road and the eastern boundary is largely Holyrood Park. The longer western boundary extends from George IV Bridge, through Forrest Road and Middle Meadow Walk, south through George Square, Buccleuch Street, Hope Park Crescent and Causewayside. The southern boundary extends east from Causewayside through Salisbury Place, Salisbury Road and Holyrood Park Road; to Holyrood Park, encompassing St Leonard's. The Southside Community Council boundaries align closely with the City of Edinburgh Council Southside Conservation Area.

== History ==
Edinburgh was created as a royal burgh in 1124. The Old Town of Edinburgh began as a collection of dwellings that developed along the Royal Mile. At this time, south of the Canongate was not significantly populated. City Walls were built following the defeat of the Scots army at Flodden in 1513. Changes in the need to live within the town wall of Edinburgh, in order to trade, were lifted in 1752 in order to permit the building of the New Town to the north of the established city and this encouraged growth south of the Royal Mile. There were already a small number of small rural properties along these routes but unlike the north, where streets were formally planned, on the south this happened on an ad hoc basis, centred on existing roads leading out of the city to neighbouring towns such as Dalkeith and Peebles.

In 1766, the first planned housing development was George Square; terraced houses with private gardens. Further development included the New Town (1767) and construction of the South Bridge (1788), improving connection to the Southside. In 1836 the opening of George IV Bridge increased commercial links with the Royal Mile and the New Town.

In Victorian Edinburgh, industrial growth attracted rural Irish and European immigrants. Housing, industry, education, worship and recreation were in close proximity. Consequently, high density tenement housing such as the Dumbiedykes and St. Leonard's were constructed. These were multiple flats in a single building, housing large, multi-generational families, and later destined to be condemned as slums.

Timeline of historic events which shaped the Southside
1621	Utilities	Edinburgh water originally supplied from the Boroughloch now supplied from Comiston.
1628 - 1636	Expansion	Telfer Wall is built to extend the Edinburgh Town Walls with ports (gates) opened to The Pleasance and Buccleuch Street in the south.
1647	Housing development	The 'Bird's eye view of Edinburgh in 1647' depicts, south of the city walls, scattered private houses and a substantial amount of development around Potterrow and The Pleasance.
1722	Development	Thomas Hope of Rankeillor (Baronet) ordered greater drainage of the Boroughloch, taking lease of the land with the intention of making a park for citizens. The Edinburgh Improvement Act of 1827 secured the site of the old loch for the citizens of Edinburgh to pursue leisure and recreational activities. It became 'The Meadows'.
1734	Housing development	Hermits and Termits - a house built in St Leonard's for historical artist David Scott, RSA.
1746	Housing development	William Reid leased the ground from Lady Nicolson to build a home now known as Pear Tree House.
1750	Housing development	Chapel House built as a family home by Robert Frame on Sir James Nicolson's land.
1760	Housing development	Start of development of Adam, Argyll and Brown Squares.
1762 - 1764	Connections	Nicolson Street built, linking the early housing developments and providing further development opportunities as Lady Nicolson released her land.
1764	Development	Academy for the deaf and dumb established in 'Dumbie House'.The name 'Dumbiedykes' is based on this house in St Leonard's.
1766	Housing development	George Square built, the first residential group of houses in the Southside.
1772	Connections	North Bridge opened.
1775	Industry	James Pillans started his printing business in Nicolson Street.
1788	Connections	South Bridge opened, spanning "the ravine of the Cowgate".
1790	Housing development	First tenements built on Nicolson Street following the construction of the South Bridge.
1794	Expansion	Nicolson Street extended to Clerk Street.
1800	Housing development	St Patrick Square and Montague and Rankeillor Street built.
1814 - 1833	Housing Development	Main housing development in 'The Dumbiedykes' and 'St Leonards' - Brown Street, Arthur Street, Salisbury Street, Carnegie Street, Beaumont Place, Forbes Street and St. Leonard's Hill.
1821	Industry	Bertrams, a major employer in the Southside, founded by brothers George and William Bertram, manufacturing paper-making machinery for worldwide export.
1831	Industry	Usher's brewery business started in Chambers Street.
1831	Industry	St. Leonard's Railway Station Edinburgh and Dalkeith Railway opened.
1827 - 1836	Connections	George IV Bridge built, spanning the Cowgate.
1845	Industry	New Nelsons factory opened in Hope Park with 600 employees.
1850 - 1870	Housing Development	Hope Park Terrace, Lutton Place and Bernard Terrace completed.
1850	Industry	Thomas Nelson II develops the Rotary Press, and in 1851 it is exhibited at the 'Great Exhibition' in London.
1853	Industry	Ushers produce and market the first ever blended whisky named 'Old Vatted Glenlivet (OVG)'.
1859	Industry	Bertrams engineers move to larger premises in St Katherine's Works site at Sciennes which they occupied for more than a century.
1860	Industry	Ushers open Park Brewery and the largest whisky warehouse in the world at St Leonard's.
1875	Leisure	First football match between Heart of Midlothian and Hibernian held in the East Meadows on Christmas Day.
1878	Industry	In April 1878, the Hope Park company headquarters of Thomas Nelson and Sons, printers, was devastated by fire.
1880	Industry	New Nelsons factory opened at Parkside Works.
1897	University	McEwan Hall handed over to Edinburgh University.
1900	Industry	Usher Hall completed and handed over to the city.
1919	Industry	Bernard Terrace works created as Pillans and Wilson company premises.
1939	War activity	500 allotments created in the East Meadows - the last evidence of them was removed by 1966.
1968	Industry	Nelsons printing and binding works and other interests sold to Morrison and Gibb, Parkside Printing Works in Dalkeith Road was closed and later demolished.
1980	Industry	Bertrams business closed and the St Katherine's Works factory demolished.
1981	Industry	Ushers Park Brewery closed.

== Southside industrial heritage ==
Well within living memory, the Southside was home to many industries and trades many of which were small businesses owned and staffed by local people. This meant that for many Southsiders the journey to work was a short one, either on foot or by bus or tram. This has changed hugely over the last few decades, with printers, brewers, manufacturing and other types of business having either closed down or moved out of the city centre.

- Bertram Limited founded in 1821 in Edinburgh was a major manufacturer of paper making machinery. Founded by George and William Bertram. Around 1859 they moved to larger premises, St. Katherine’s Works in Sciennes. Other products included steam engines, rubber mill and plantation machinery. It had a reputation as a family orientated company and acquired the Meggetland sports ground. The factory closed in 1985.
- Boroughloch Brewery, in Buccleuch Street was established prior to 1805 by James Anderson. By 1850 it was acquired by Alexander Melvin and by the 1860s it was the fifth largest brewery business in Scotland. By the 1880s it was exporting beer to Australia, India, West Indies, South Africa and the USA. It ceased to brew in January 1907 and its trade and goodwill was acquired by William McEwan & Co Ltd. The site was converted into housing.
- Alexander Cowan & Sons was established in 1770 in Penicuik and grew to become one of the world’s largest paper mills. Cragside Stationery Works was located on Dumbiedykes Road. They did die stamping and produced envelopes and boxes. They also had manufacturing capability in London, Australia and New Zealand. In 1966 the Reed Paper Group bought the company and Cragside was closed.
- Duncan, Flockhart & Co were wholesale druggists, manufacturing chemists and aerated water manufacturers. They opened a factory in Holyrood Road in 1876 supplying vaccines, anaesthetics and domestic medicines. Flockhart had a surgery at No. 52 North Bridge. They manufactured drugs, most notably morphine and chloroform supplied to James Young Simpson and large quantities of chloroform to Florence Nightingale. After being absorbed in Glaxo Group in 1963, the factory was closed.
- Ferguson's Rock was founded by Alexander Ferguson who established his business in 1837. They specialised in wholesale confectionery, the manufacture of boiled sweets, lozenges and Edinburgh Rock. Manufacturing and Sales were located in Melbourne Place, near George IV Bridge until 1959 when it was demolished and council official built on the site. The company then relocated to East Crosscauseway.

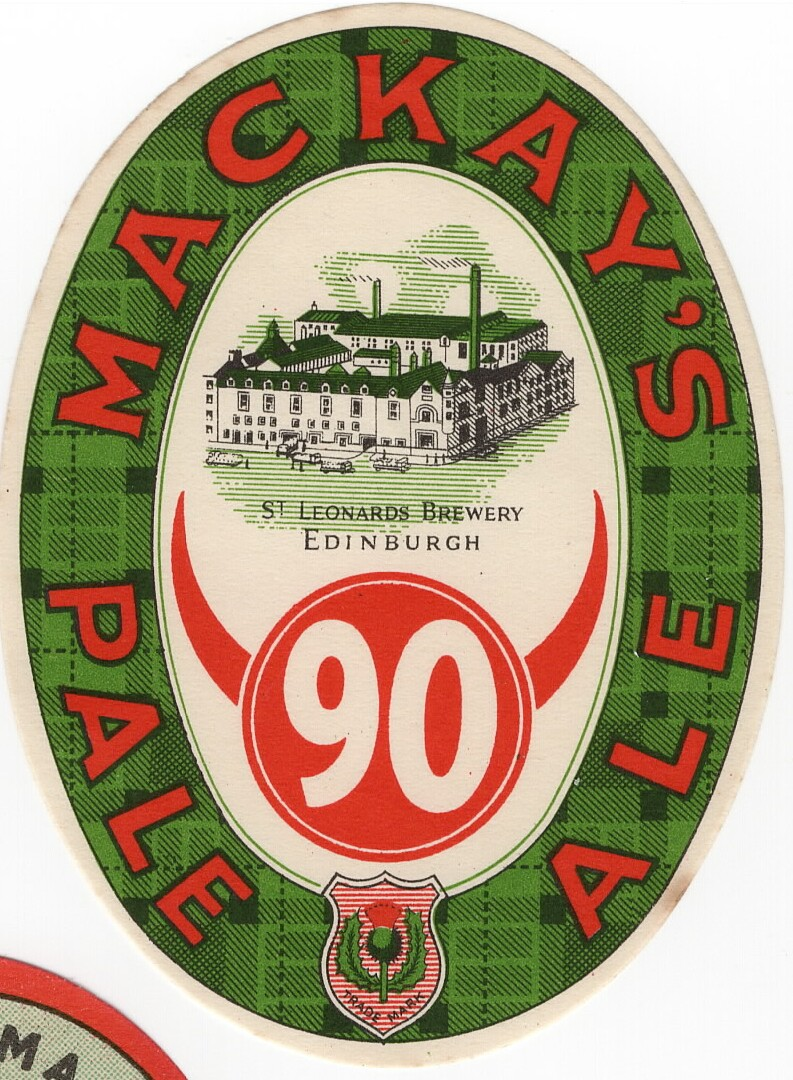
St Leonards works

- George Mackay & Co. Ltd was founded in 1867. St. Leonard's Brewery was in St. Leonard’s Street and was a partnership of brewers and malt masters. The firm used a steeple engine to pump water from underground for brewing purposes; now on display at the National Museum of Scotland. London based distillers Seager, Evans & Co Ltd, purchased the St. Leonard's Brewery and 34 public houses in 1960, and re-sold it to London brewers Watney Mann Ltd in 1961. Brewing ceased in 1963 and the buildings were replaced with flats.
- Middlemass Biscuits was established in 1853 originally on South Clerk Street. The company built a new factory on the corner of Salisbury Place and relocated in 1869. Middlemass was famous for the production of the Albert Biscuit, named after Prince Albert and the first digestive biscuit. The factory closed in 1974 and was demolished for a development by the National Library of Scotland which has occupied the site with its Maps Reading Room since 1985.
- John Millar & Sons was a bakery in Leith founded in 1844. It re-located to Causewayside and expanded to sell boiled sweets and confectionery. They merged with McCowans in 2006.
- Thomas Nelson & Sons was one of the Southside’s largest employers. Thomas Nelson, in 1798 had started with book shops in West Bow selling re-prints of classics. By 1839 Thomas Nelson and his sons started production of their own books and in the 1840s they built an extensive factory at Hope Park with 600 employees. Every stage of the process of book production from writing through to packing for dispatch. In 1850 Thomas Nelson Jnr invented the rotary press. In 1878 the factory was destroyed by fire ^{[ Note 1].} Parkside Works was built in 1880, becoming a famous Edinburgh landmark, employing 400. In 1907 an additional factory was built publishing 200,000 books a week. Nelsons had become the most successful publishing company in the world. After becoming part of the Thomson Organisation in 1962, the Edinburgh printing business was sold, in 1968 to Morrison & Gibbs. Parkside Works was demolished in 1972 and the site sold to Scottish Widows. Nelsons encouraged a family culture and provided sports and social facilities for employees including Parkside Bowling Club. They also built Nelson Hall as a reading room where the Southside Heritage Group meets today.

[Note 1] The City assisted by providing temporary accommodation adjacent to the destroyed building and to recognise this assistance, Nelsons erected the Unicorn and Lion pillars at the entrance to Melville Drive in 1881.

- Pillans and Wilson was a prominent Edinburgh-based printing firm founded in 1775 by James Pillans. Initially, operating in a tenement in the Southside it evolved into a key player during the Scottish Enlightenment. It moved around the Southside and in 1890 they were joined by W. Scott Wilson to create Pillans & Wilson. In 1919 they moved to a custom-built factory in Bernard Terrace which integrated printing, binding, and publishing. The company had a reputation for high-quality book production, employing up to 400 staff at its peak. It was acquired by Colorgraphic PLC in 1987. It closed in 2006 due to a declining demand for traditional printing.
- Scottish Widows is a major life insurance, pensions and investment company, formed in Edinburgh in 1815 to support families who had lost someone in the Napoleonic Wars. Following the demolition of Thomas Nelson's they moved their headquarters from St. Andrew’s Square to Dalkeith Road in 1976. The building was designed by Basil Spence, is an A-listed building, and was occupied by 2,200 employees. It became part of Lloyds TSB in 2009 and the offices were closed in 2020. In 2025, plans were announced to redevelop the buildings as student accommodation with partial demolition of the landmark hexagonal bronze-glazed blocks.
- J&G Stewart were whisky distillers ^{[Note 2]} in St Leonard's (Between Nelson's Parkside printing works and Holyrood Park). Founded in 1779 as a rum importer, the company started blending, bottling and exporting Scotch Whisky to a world market. Later they were to occupy Pear Tree House in West Nicolson Street until 1972. At their peak, they were bottling 40 brands at St Leonard's including spirits other than whisky. In 1976, the Stewart's Whisky Bond in Edinburgh was closed down, and in 1986, Whyte & Mackay acquired the brand. The building at St Leonard's is now flats.

^{[Note 2]} The distilling industry in the 20c was restructured to manage Scottish malt production and control output. In 1917 J&G Stewart became a subsidiary of Scottish Malt Distillers Ltd (SMD), which was a subsidiary of The Distillers Company Limited (DCL). The Usher distilling interests were disposed of in 1918 (including Pear Tree House) to SMD and hence J&G Stewart.

- Summerhall Brewery was one of the earliest commercial breweries in Edinburgh and predates the draining of the South Loch. Brewing began in 1704 at Hope Park End. It was founded by Robert McClellan and then owned by a series of small brewers. At its height in the 19th century, it had 120 employees. From 1862 to 1869, Robin McMillan Ltd combined it with other small breweries (including Bell’s Brewery) into Edinburgh United Breweries Ltd and it suffered financially and with poor quality beers. Brewing at Summerhall closed in 1908. From1916 to 2011 this site was the Royal School of Veterinary Studies. In 2012 Barney’s micro-brewery, established by Andrew Barnett in Falkirk in 2010, moved to Summerhall.
- Usher's was an Edinburgh brewing and distilling dynasty. Andrew Usher (1782-1855) was a prominent Scottish brewer who experimented with the blending of whisky in the 1840s. He established a brewery in Merchant Street. This passed to his sons James and Thomas in 1831, registered as J & T Usher. They were prodigious brewers of beer and in 1860 moved the business to Park Brewery in St. Leonard’s Street, adjacent to the railway yards. It was registered in 1895 as Thomas Usher & Son Ltd. Andrew Usher (1826-1898) perfected the blending of whisky and is considered the 'father of Scottish whisky'. With his brother Sir John Usher, he founded Andrew Usher & Co, Whisky Distilling and Blending. The company secured the rights to bottle and distribute all the output of the Glenlivet Distillery for over 100 years. In 1860 he built Park Brewery warehouses and bottling plant in St. Leonard's. At the time it was the largest in the world. The company headquarters were located at Pear Tree House. The Ushers were philanthropists and donated £100,000 to build Usher Concert Hall. Ushers beer was delivered to pubs in Edinburgh by horse and cart for over 100 years until the 1970s. The business, including 170 public houses, was sold to Vaux & Associated Breweries Ltd in 1959. By 1976 it employed 2,500 people. In the following years it was operated by Lorimer & Clark, and later acquired by Allied Breweries Ltd, finally ceasing brewing in 1981. In 2014, a microbrewery was installed at Ushers of Edinburgh, in the basement of Pear Tree House, the 18th century mansion on West Nicolson Street.
- William Younger & Co. Ltd was a family-owned brewery business in the Southside of Edinburgh. Archibald Younger in 1778 established St Ann's Brewery in Croft-an' Righ. After he died his brother, William Younger, acquired the Abbey Brewery in the Canongate. In 1858, William acquired the Holyrood Brewery establishing it in 18th century buildings in Holyrood Road. At one time it was the largest brewery in Edinburgh generating 600 barrels a week. St Ann's brewery closed in 1961 and was demolished in 1987. 13 Croft-an-Righ is now a listed building featuring a 5-storey malthouse and a former kiln. The Abbey Brewery was demolished in the late 1990s and is now the site of the Scottish Parliament building. Youngers merged with William McEwan & Co. Ltd in 1931 to form Scottish Brewers Ltd and later merged with Newcastle Breweries Ltd in 1960 to form Scottish & Newcastle Breweries Ltd the largest brewing company in the UK. Holyrood Brewery operated until 1987 and was demolished in 1995.

== 20th century redevelopment ==
By the end of World War I, the Southside of Edinburgh housing was described as having "the worst slums in Edinburgh".

It was a neighbourhood of industry, housing, shops and local businesses. Tenements were in a poor state, not maintained by their landlords, lacking sanitation and overcrowded. The UK Government, the Scottish Office and Edinburgh Corporation produced legislation to address this housing crisis; defining the minimum habitable standard, increasing the housing stock and clearing slums.

From the 1920s to 1970s, multiple factors influenced Edinburgh city planning and specifically for the Southside.

Throughout this period, demolition was the preferred method of redeveloping neighbourhoods, and thousands of families were displaced mostly to new Corporation built housing on the periphery of the city. This heavily impacted long-standing communities with a loss of local heritage.

Between 1950 and 1973, the Edinburgh Corporation closed or demolished 16,556 homes and displaced 35,237 individuals.

The 1972 Town and Country Act introduced Local Plans and the mandatory involvement of residents. This gave residents the opportunity to preserve the cultural identity of their neighbourhoods, an example was the Southside Association's influence in the reversal of the decision to demolish Nicolson Street.

Some of these proposals were realised, such as improved housing, the expansion of the University of Edinburgh, before planning policies changed to prioritise rehabilitation, protection of existing buildings and conservation. Others were abandoned, such as the Eastern Link Road, but only after delays and demolition and dispersal of families to facilitate the proposals had occurred.

Planning proposals and decisions and their impact on the Southside
1927	City Improvement Scheme.	Demolition and redevelopment of housing (1931 – 1938).	Part of the Pleasance, East Crosscauseway, Buccleuch Street, Simon Square, Gifford Park, St Patrick Square.
1931	Corporation Plan for Central Edinburgh & Old Town.	Frank Mears city plan: 50 year vision, road network modernisation, new government, administrative and educational buildings, "Greater University", slum clearance.	Extensive clearances, renovation and new building across the city and Southside Delayed due to financial crisis of 1931 and outbreak of war in 1939.
1947	Town & Country Planning Act.	Introduced Comprehensive Development Plans & Areas.	Empowered local authorities to redevelop land, or use compulsory purchase orders.
1949	Abercrombie Civic Survey and Plan.	Proposed: Clearly defined zones, dual carriageway with tunnel through the Old Town, road through Holyrood Park, University expansion, Bridges Bypass.	Demolition of 'slum' districts with two decades of demolition of housing and historic buildings. Redevelopment of George Square. Road development abandoned in 1977.
1950	Comprehensive Development Area (St. Leonard's).	Permission granted for University construction in George Square.	.
1953	City & Royal Burgh of Edinburgh Development Plan.	Comprehensive Development Area for St. Leonard's/Dumbiedykes submitted to Secretary of State 66 objections & public inquiry.	Secretary of State granted permission in 1955 (full plan by 1957).
1954	Housing (Repairs and Rents) (Scotland) Act, Section 3.	Additional powers of local authorities: Clearance Areas, purchase of houses liable to demolition, landlords responsible for repairs. Recovery of expenses by tenants in rendering houses fit for human habitation.	Initiated the slum clearance programme in Edinburgh. Local authority required, within 1 year, to submit proposals to Secretary of State.
1956	City Planning Permission - University Expansion.	Integration of scattered parts of the University with redevelopment of George Square and wider Southside.	Modernist blocks replacing Georgian buildings Public Inquiry in 1959.
1957	City and Royal Burgh of Edinburgh Development Plan.	Comprehensive Development Area' specific to St Leonards (Dumbiedykes) - North zone 'educational and cultural', Southern zone residential. City-wide development focused on road networks, St. Leonard’s roundabout, Eastern Approach Road, Bridges Relief Road, Tollcross Link Road, University Medical School, Bus station.	Demolish housing along road routes - Canongate, Dumbiedykes, Arthur Street, St. Leonard’s Street, Holyrood Road, Potterow, Nicolson Street, Hope Park Terrace, George Square. Dalkeith Road, Railway Yards, Tunnels under Arthur Street and Meadows, Displaced populations.
1959	Public Inquiry.	Review of 1956 permission to redevelop George Square with redevelopment of parts of Southside to create a campus.	Buildings not comparable to Charlotte Square and dilapidated. Redevelopment allowed to proceed and implemented through 1960s.
1959	'Penny Tenement' collapse. Carnegie Street Clearance Area.	Tenement in Beaumont Place collapses with no fatalities. Owner attempted to sell in 1953 for a penny. Raised in UK Parliament and clearance areas declared around Carnegie Street.	Evacuation of families. Rehousing of 250 people including evacuation of 10,12,14 and 15 Beaumont Place, Dalrymple Street, Dumbiedykes, St. Leonard's Hill. Viability of shops in St. Leonard's under threat.
1961	Comprehensive Development Area "Mound/Lawnmarket" proposed by Edinburgh University.	Renovation of New College and Old Town. Re-development of 8 acres.	Did not obtain approval.
1961 - 1964	George Square demolition and redevelopment.	Redevelopment of George Square, demolishing existing tenements to build modernist university buildings.	Construction of the University Library, Appleton Tower & David Hume Tower. Destruction of Georgian buildings; 50% later to become a UNESCO World Heritage site.
1962	Comprehensive Development Area "University/Nicolson Street". Proposed by Edinburgh University.	"Historic tenements to be replaced by a new urban landscape of slab blocks…. creating a seamless continuum between the university and the city".	"The character of the area was to be annihilated. The whole fabric, history and community of the South Side were to be utterly destroyed". Not presented by Edinburgh Corporation (City Council) to the Scottish Secretary. Not approved; defunct in 1975.
1960 - 1963	University Comprehensive Development Area proposed.	Joint plan to develop east of George Square to accommodate university growth and to create a larger 'campus area'.	University proceeded with development but the Council did not.
1963	Buchanan Plan.	Landmark study on urban transportation planning. Inner city ring road; including bridges and flyovers.	Demolition and clearance through central Edinburgh affecting Pleasance, Bristo Dumbiedykes Road, Arthur Street. Revised proposals until bypass constructed between 1981 and 1990.
1965	Nicolson Street Comprehensive Development Area adopted by Edinburgh Corporation Planning.	Previous proposal from Edinburgh University adopted and budgeted by Council.	Parts of Nicolson Street; 500 residents re-housed.
1965	Clearance Area declared.	Compulsory Purchase Order (confirmed January 1968).	212 houses dating from 1770;Davie Street, West Richmond Street. 78-140 Nicolson Street reprieved after objections.
1966	Population decline.	Since 1951 population declined by 62%.	In early 1960s, 1,030 houses demolished in the St Leonard's. Estimated 1,977 people displaced.
1966	Quinquennial Review of 1957 Development Plan.	Southside recommended as an Action Area.	Nicholson Street considered an ‘obsolete development and bad layout’. 1968 Action Area removed. 1974 Review approved. Period of uncertainty over plans for the Southside.
1967	Civil Amenities Act 1967.	Concept of conservation areas introduced. Protection and improvement of buildings of architectural or historic interest and of the character of these areas. Statutory requirement to consider improvement not demolition.	Impacted future proposals for a Southside Conservation Area in mid 1970s.
1967	Public Inquiry over 'Bridges Relief Road'.	Six week inquiry on proposal for a double-level four lane road through the Southside. Recommendation by the Secretary of State for Scotland that Transport and Planning consultants be employed.	Delayed or disrupted development or improvement in the Southside until study completed in 1972.
1968	Southside Action Area removed and Clearance Order approved.	Secretary of State instructed that 1957 zonings be restored. Edinburgh Corporation increased the annual target for houses to be demolished from 700 to 1,000.	Highlighted by the Nicolson Street Traders' Association. Council acquired and cleared Nicolson Street and adjacent areas.
1968	Hill Place.	Houses declared unfit.Hill Square remained as the properties better maintained.	96 people displaced and Georgian houses built in 1809 demolished.
1968	Clearance Area declared.	Clearance of buildings in St. Leonard's and the Pleasance.	Community of 675 people displaced and businesses demolished. 276 200 year-old, three to six-storey houses, shops and pubs demolished. East and West Adam Street, Richmond Place, Drummond Street, Ingliston Street, North Richmond Street.
1968	Forbes Street and St Leonard's Lane designated a Clearance Area.	Different construction - squat buildings and narrow streets.	Forbes Street, St. Leonard's Lane; 310 houses cleared, 675 people displaced.
1969	Housing Act 1969.	UK Legislation - established the concept of General Improvement Areas to allow for regeneration. Replaced Comprehensive Development Areas with Housing Treatment Areas; required Local Authorities to rehabilitate obsolete buildings.	Areas previously declared for 'clearance' survived and were improved - "paradigm shift in approach to urban renewal".
1969	Pleasance and West Nicolson Street declared unfit.	Houses purchased by Edinburgh Corporation.	Proposal to demolish blocks of historic buildings. Impact: 83 houses and 157 people, Pleasance. West Nicolson Street. Public enquiry called in 1972.
1970	Eastern Link Road proposed by Edinburgh Corporation.	Six lane road as part of the Inner Ring Road.	Large scale demolition in the Pleasance. Abandoned in 1977.
1971	'Parkers Triangle' demolished.	Implementing University plan of 1963. Tenements declared unfit in 1966.	All buildings demolished in zone bounded by Lothian Street, Bristo Street, Charles Street, Crichton Street and Potterow. 270 people displaced; car park created.
1972	South Side Association formed.	Formed to represent the people of the Southside (and oppose wholesale demolition). To counter University ambitions to establish CDA covering Meadows to St. Leonard's. Influenced Public Inquiry re-proposed demolition of houses in West Nicolson Street.	Secretary of State confirmed Compulsory Purchase Orders for demolition. Plans placed under review.
1973	South Side Local Plan.	Major change in City planning. Removed requirement for UK Government approval. Work in South Side proceeded on the basis of a Local Plan rather than a Comprehensive Development Plan.	Change of focus for planners, residents and traders "at their core was the wish to create an environment satisfactory to the existing community".
1973	Buccleuch Street demolition order reversed.	South Side Association opposed 1970 and 1972 proposals for demolition in West Crosscauseway and Buccleuch Street.	Buccleuch Street secured from demolition.
1974	Edinburgh Corporation 1974/78 Housing Programme.	Establishment of a rehabilitation policy.	5,821 sub-standard properties, 41% to be demolished and 59% improved. Properties recommended for improvement: Howden Street, Drummond Street, East Crosscauseway and High School Yards.
1974	South Side Advisory Panel of Edinburgh University formed.	Bringing together all stakeholders to create a 'policy package'.	Associations formed: Dumbiedykes Residents' Association, Nicolson Street Traders' Association, Southside Residents' Association, Cockburn Association.
1975	South Side Conservation Area designated.	Conservation Area designated, later (extended in 1986, adjusted in 1996). Changed the solution to improvement not demolition.	Regeneration of the remainder of the Southside area and the retention of its remaining historic identity.
1976	South Side Local Plan - Pilot Scheme.	Pilot study to assess feasibility of rehabilitating other housing areas in the Southside.	Davie Street, West Richmond Street to be replaced in historic style.
1977	Eastern Link Road plan abandoned.	Final attempt to build a major road through the Southside.	0.9 miles long, linking St Leonard's with Leith Walk via Calton Hill. Leith Street and Greenside demolished. Removed threat to Southside neighbourhood.
1978	Pilot Block.	Partial restoration and rebuilding of a full street block on Nicolson Street. Conservation and restoration of buildings replacing those beyond repair in a historic style to preserve the character of the area.	Creation of 69 flats, a supermarket, 24 shops and a pub between East Crosscauseway and Richmond Street.
1995	Old and New Towns of Edinburgh designated as UNESCO Heritage Site.	City's unique architectural and historical significance.	Highlighting contrast and evolution between the medieval Old Town and 18th century Georgian New Town
2002	South Side Conservation Area Character Appraisal.	Scottish Ministers require Character Appraisals for areas before approving any new Article 4 Direction Orders. Character appraisals to define special qualities and architectural and historic interests.	Conservation Area status: demolition requires consent, and attention to character and appearance.
2019	South Side Conservation Area updated.	Addition of a group of category A listed buildings, with special architectural and historic importance. Buildings having distinct character and significant value cited as good architectural styles.	Additions: The Royal Commonwealth Pool, Scottish Widows building, Pollock Halls. Removed: Forbes Street, St Leonard’s Police Station.

== Schooling in the Southside ==
The Southside was a densely populated area with many large families, which created a strong demand for schools. Apart from James Clark School, all of these were primary schools, as state-funded secondary education did not exist until 1918. With a school leaving age of 14, children stayed at the primary schools from the age of 5 until they left school, with there being what was known as vocational supplementary teaching to prepare them for the world of work. Schools were denominational and the Catholic schools were generally run by religious organisations until they were eventually taken over by the city council.

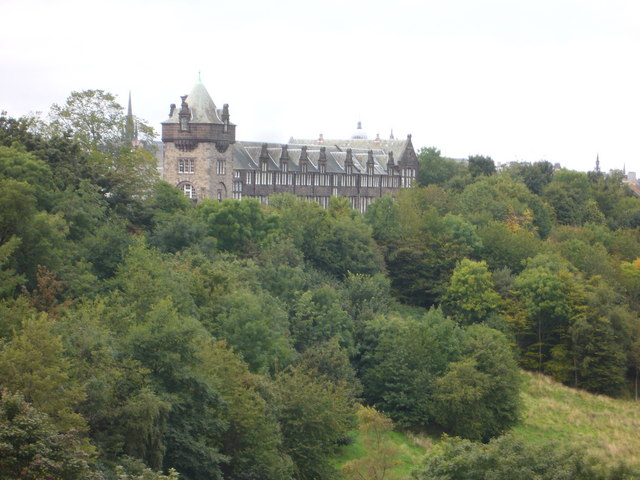
James Clark School

James Clark Secondary School: A category B listed building designed by John Alexander Carfrae and constructed between 1913 and 1919 on the high ground where the hospital and chapel of St. Leonard formerly stood, dating from the 13th century. It was originally planned as a primary school, to be called King's Park School. The building was completed 1915, but it was taken over as a military garrison, so did not open as a school until 1918. It functioned as a Junior Secondary until 1972 at which time the remaining 300-400 pupils transferred to Boroughmuir High School. From 1974 to 1975, it was used as an annexe for 200 First Year pupils of Castlebrae Secondary School. The building was zoned to be demolished for the proposed Eastern Link Road, which was never built, so the building survived and was converted to housing.

Bristo Primary School: The school was built in 1877, replacing the old Potterrow School. The school occupied the site of the house in which Clarinda, Robert Burns' lover lived. It closed in 1934 and the pupils moved to South Bridge School and Sciennes School. The building was used as a Technical College until it was demolished along with the homes and shops in the 'Parkers Triangle'.

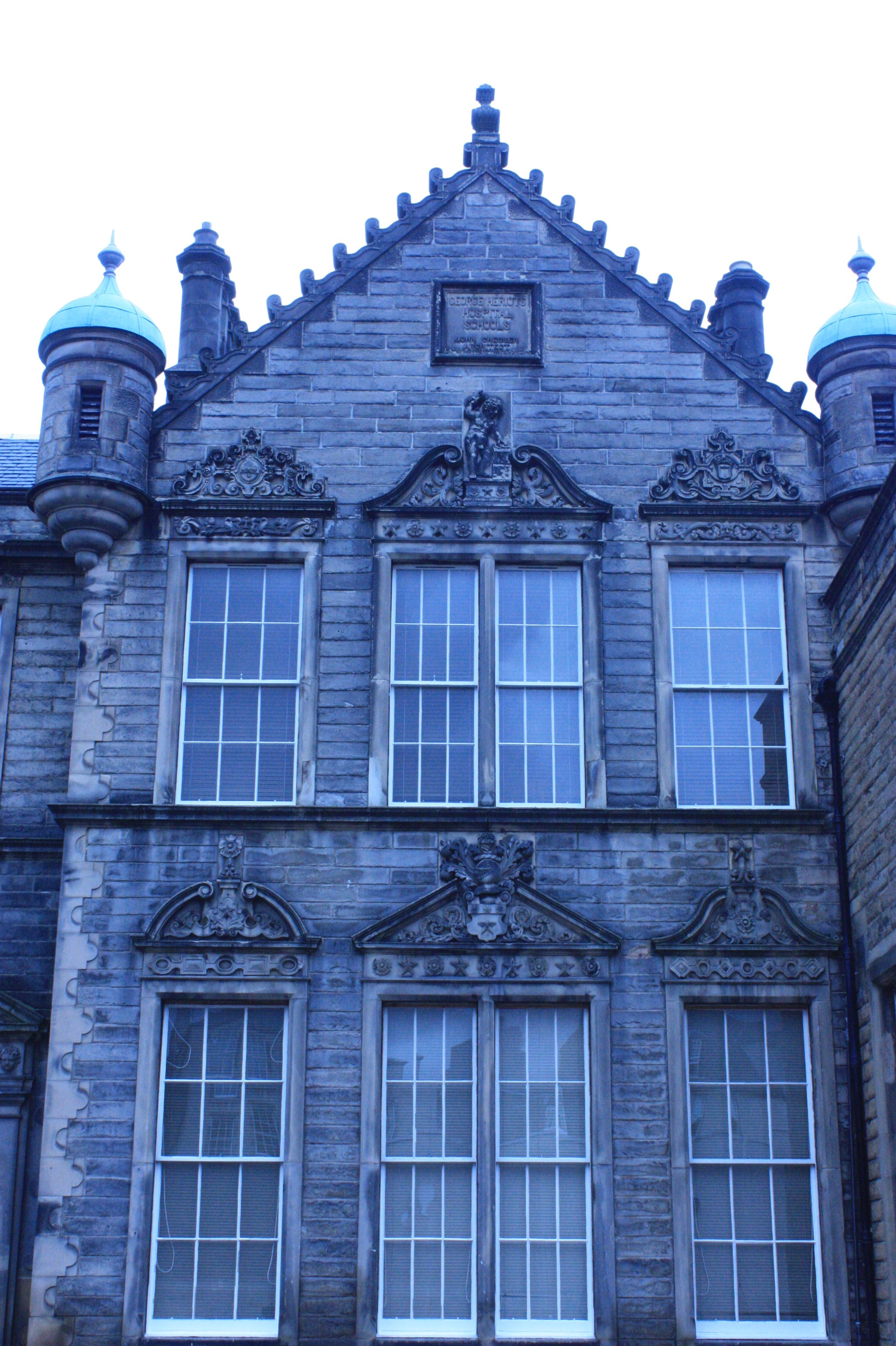
Davie Street School

Buccleuch Parish School Built on North Meadow Walk, Hope Park Square in 1839 and designed by architect George Smith. The Royal Commission on the Ancient and Historical Monuments of Scotland (RCAHMS) added it to the Buildings at Risk register in 200I. It was then purchased (as Hope Park Halls) and occupied by St. Andrew's Orthodox Church from 2003-2013.

Davie Street Primary School: Constructed in 1875 by The Heriot Trust, it was taken over by Edinburgh School Board in 1886. When it closed as a school it became an annexe for James Clark School. In 1969, it was converted to use as a resource centre. The council later sold the property which was then developed for private housing.

Drummond Street Primary School: Built in 1906 and used as the Infants' department for South Bridge Primary School. It closed as a school in 1968, but the building was used by St Patrick's School until June 1984, when it closed. Now converted to flats, the building still rests on, and contains, a section of The Flodden Wall.

Newington Academy: Was a private school at 8 Newington Road (formerly Arniston Place) attended by a young Arthur Conan Doyle between the ages of seven and nine, 1866 and 1868.

Preston Street Primary School: Designed by John Alexander Carfrae and constructed between 1896 and 1897. The school roll was 682 in 1944/45 and 304 in 1974/75. In 1985, owing to the school roll continuing to fall, the school was threatened with closure, but parent action and the concurrent 'regeneration' of the Southside ensured that it remained open. In 1987, the council refurbished the exterior of the school with the building being upgraded two years later.

Robertson's Academy: A private school which was located at 19 East Preston Street.

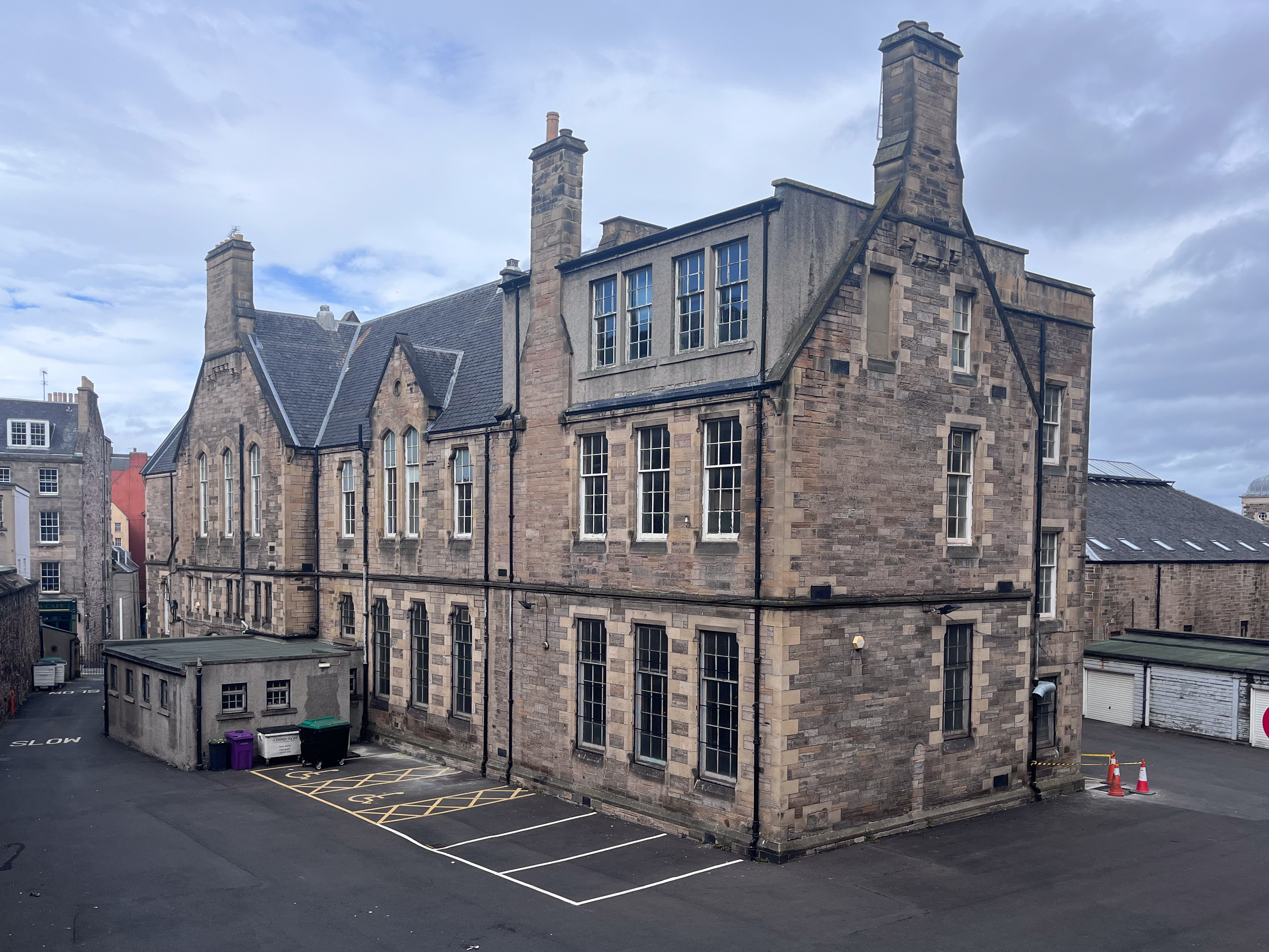
South Bridge School

Sciennes Primary School: Built in 1892, it served children from the Southside until Preston Street School opened five years later. It continues to be the main primary school serving Marchmont, Mayfield, Sciennes and The Grange and is one of the largest in Edinburgh.

South Bridge Primary School: Built in 1880 in Infirmary Street, on the site of the former Edinburgh Royal Infirmary, with a section of the Flodden Wall as a back playground wall. It opened in 1886. The school roll was 1,047 in 1944/45, dropping to 125 in 1974/75, at which time the capacity was 225 at 30 pupils per class. The school closed in 1983, but the building has been actively used since then as a resource centre, a community centre for the local Canongate Youth Project and for Adult Education. In February 2025, the Edinburgh Festival Fringe Society moved into the building to create a new 'Hub' with Canongate Youth and Adult Education continuing in the same building.

St Ann's Primary School: Located in South Grays Close in the Cowgate, at the bottom of Blackfriars Street. It opened in 1903 and was run by the Sisters of Mercy. Boys transferred to St Patrick's at age 7 with the girls staying on until they went to secondary school. Although St Ann's stopped being a separate school in 1949 with the amalgamation with St Patrick's, the building continued for many years as the St. Ann's Community Centre.

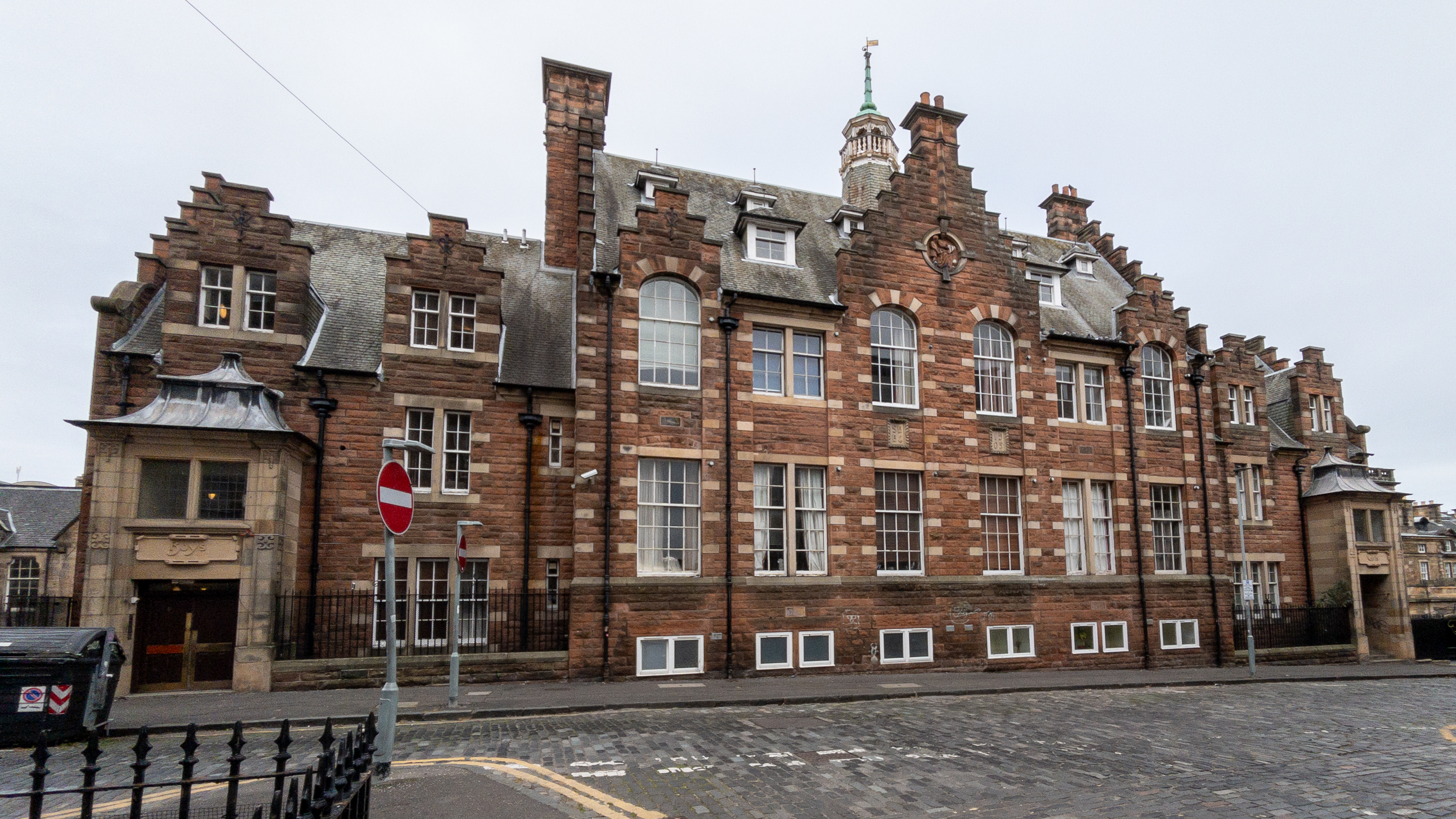
St Patrick's RC School Drummond St

St Columba's Primary School: Moved into the Southside in 1897 at 41/43 Newington Road, from Strathearn Road in Marchmont. In 1924 it moved again to Causewayside where it became a Primary and Secondary school. The school closed in 1941 as the roll fell.

St Leonard's Primary School: Built in 1876 in Forbes Street. It closed as a school in 1931 and became an annexe for James Clark School. The building was demolished with the rest of Forbes Street in the 1980s.

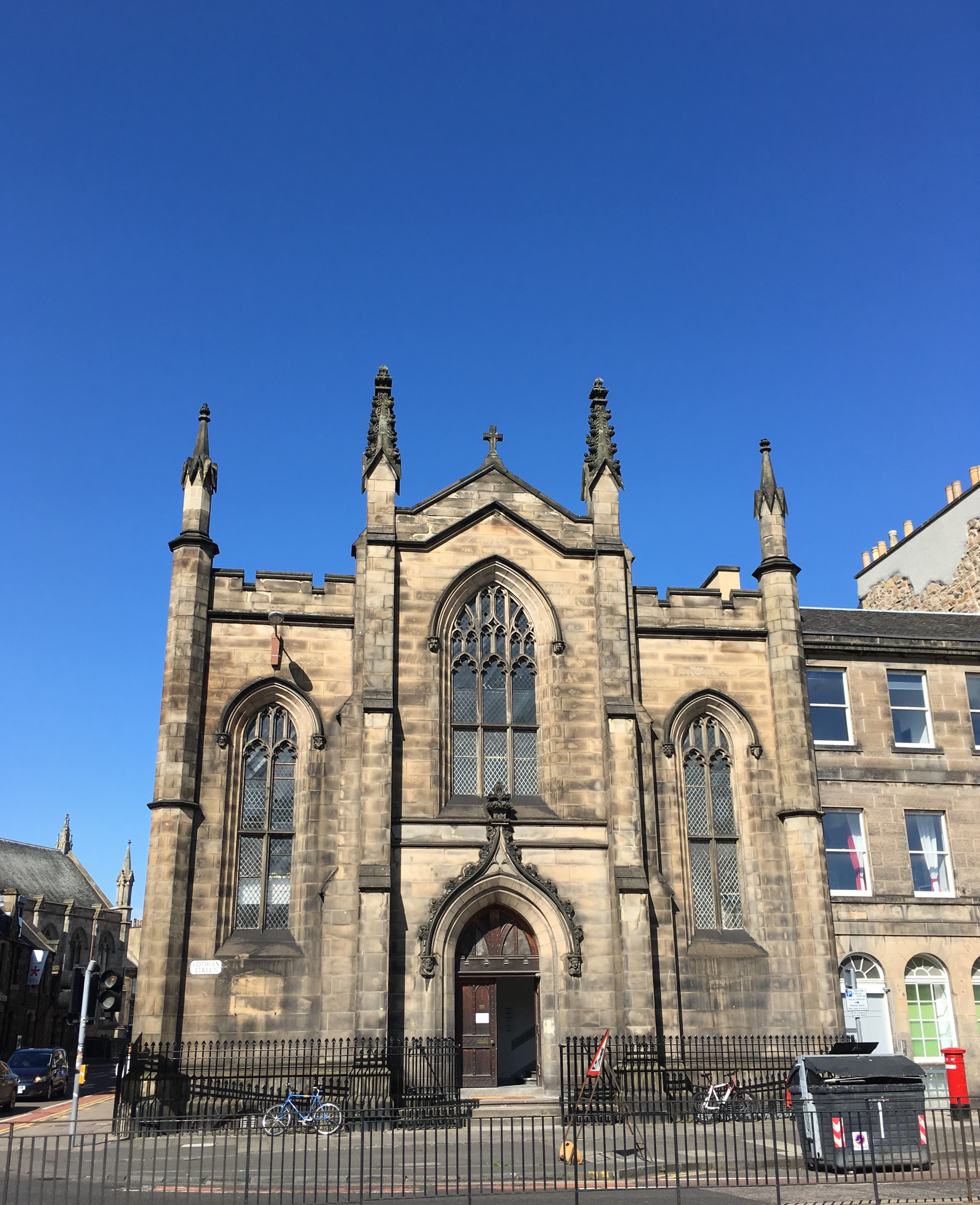
Former St Patrick's

St Patrick's Primary School: Established in Lothian Street in 1845, in the basement of the church of the same name. In 1873, the school moved to the Cowgate and expanded into the St Mary's Street Halls. It moved to the former Industrial School in St John's Hill in 1921, where it remained until 1968 when St John's Hill was to be demolished. Pupils moved to the former Drummond Street School building until the school closed in June 1984.

St Mary's Primary School: Originally established in the early 1870s at 55 Lothian Street, in the former St Patrick's building, it was later combined with St Ann's in the Cowgate.

== Notable buildings in the Southside ==
The Southside has examples of Georgian and Victorian architecture and structures from the last 300 years. Although many historic buildings were demolished in the 20th century, streets and public buildings remain which are a record of the Southside as an industrial area and cultural district. The designation of the Southside in 1975 as a conservation area ensured that a significant element of these historic buildings were protected.

- Royal Infirmary, first established in 1729 in Infirmary Street. In 1741 it moved into new premises designed by William Adam. It remained there until moving to Lauriston in 1879, a building which now houses the University's Futures Institute.
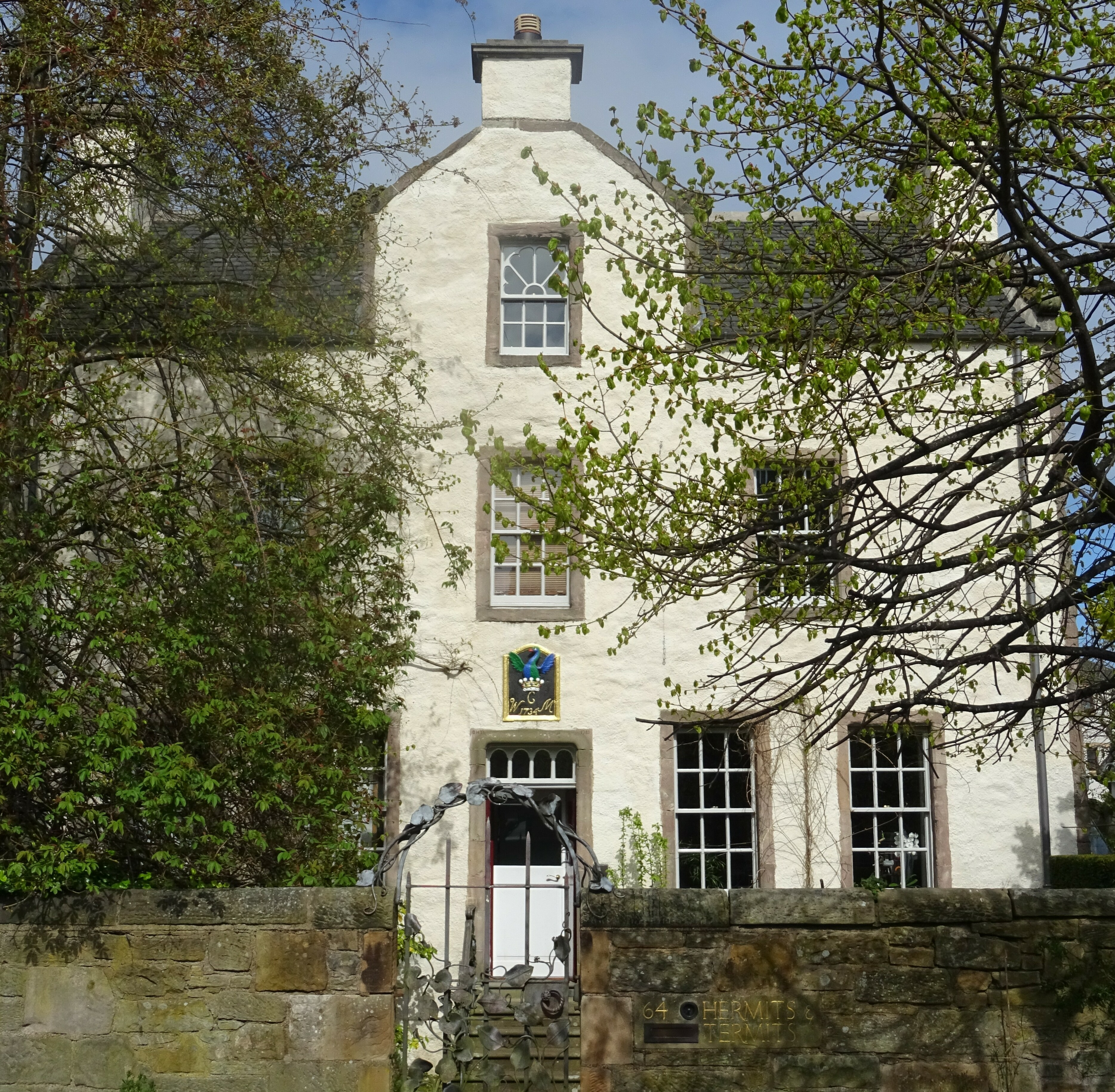
  Hermits & Termits 1734
- Hermits and Termits, a Georgian house in St Leonard's, built in 1734 and still in use as a family home.
- Pear Tree House, in 1747, one of the first residences established in the Southside.
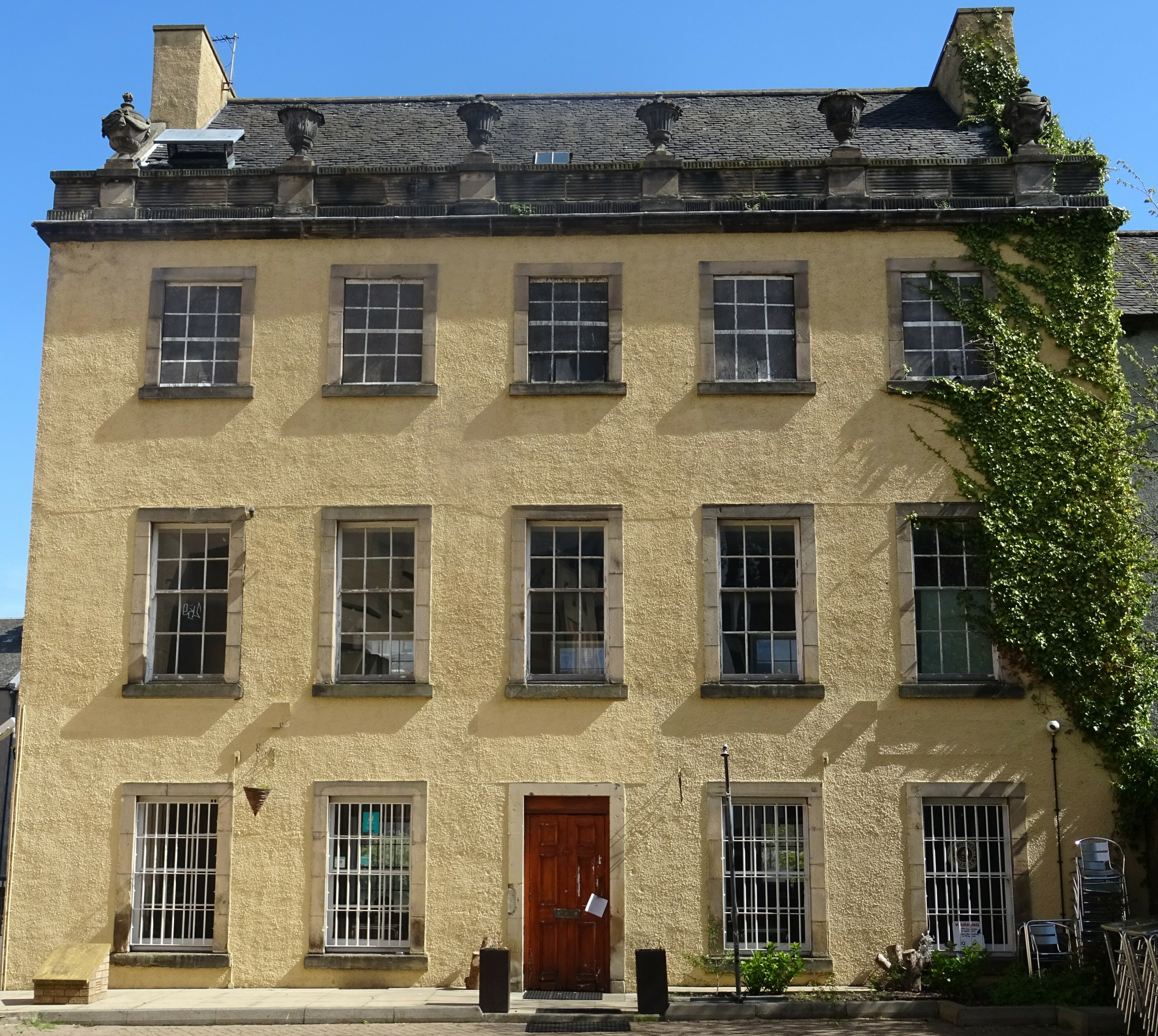
  Chapel House 1750
- Chapel House, built in 1750 as a family home by Robert Frame on Sir James Nicolson's land. Andrew Melrose, the tea merchant made it home for himself and his thirty apprentices and after his death in 1855, it became the Royal Maternity and Lying-In Hospital. It was here that Professor James Young Simpson first made use of chloroform in maternity cases. In 2025, it was being renovated as an education building for Edinburgh Central Mosque.
- Buccleuch Parish Church, now St Andrew's Orthodox Church, was created as a quoad sacra church linked to St Cuthbert's Church and opened in 1756 as St Cuthbert's "Chapel of Ease" - reducing the burden on the main church. Although there was plenty of empty ground around, it limited its graveyard to a small parcel of land, avoiding the need to acquire land from third parties. The graveyard was quickly filled and had to be supplemented by the creation of East Preston Street Burial Ground in 1820. One of the famous figures buried here is Deacon Brodie, respected citizen by day and housebreaker by night who was hanged at the Tolbooth in 1788.
- George Square, developed in 1766 to accommodate the aristocracy who began to look towards moving to houses in this new suburb beyond the city wall. Notable residents were Sir Arthur Conan Doyle and Sir Walter Scott. Only the west side remains intact after demolition to accommodate university expansion.
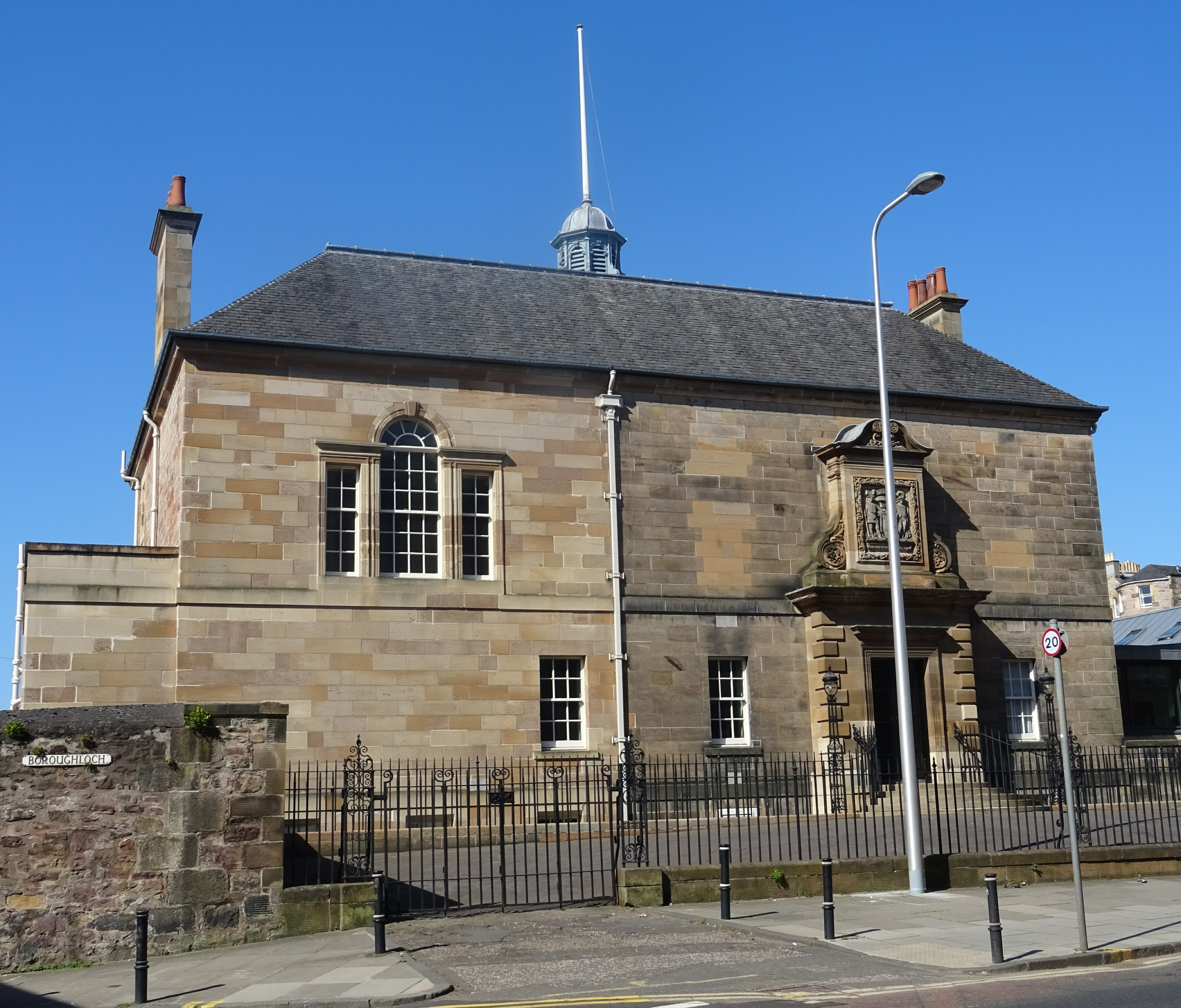
  Archers Hall - 1777
- Archers' Hall, established in Buccleuch Parish in 1777, it is the home of the sovereign's bodyguard in Scotland.
- Nicolson Square Methodist Chapel, built in 1815 and now a category A listed building. During his visit to Edinburgh in 1877 as part of his world tour, Ulysses S. Grant, President of the United States, attended worship here at the invitation of Lord Provost Thomas Jamieson Boyd.
- Heriot-Watt University, a college in Chambers Street from 1821 until its charter as a university in 1966 and move to the outskirts of town in 1992.
- 'Dick Vet' - Summerhall, founded by William Dick in 1823, The Royal (Dick) School of Veterinary Studies, affectionately known to all as the Dick Vet, was at Summerhall from 1916 to 2011, moving to the new building in the Southside from Clyde Street off St Andrew Square in central Edinburgh.
- Queen's Hall, opened as Hope Park Chapel in 1824, it was repurposed as a performance venue in 1979.
- Old College, original design by Robert Adam, with building starting in 1789, using Craigleith sandstone. However, Adam died in 1792 and William Henry Playfair was commissioned in 1815 to complete it. It was opened in 1827 as "the New College". Lord Darnley, husband of Mary, Queen of Scots, was murdered in 1567 at Kirk O’Field, which is now the site of the Old Quad.
- Surgeons' Hall, the Headquarters of the Royal College of Surgeons of Edinburgh, opened in 1832, it is now a popular museum.
- Rutherfords Bar, opened in 1837. There is a plaque on the north west corner of Drummond Street about Robert Louis Stevenson, the Edinburgh born author. He is known to have frequented Rutherfords as a young student at Old College; his work included characters who frequented Rutherfords.
- Buccleuch Free Church, the foundation stone was laid in 1855 and building was completed in 1857. The spire was given a new design in 1861 and is 174 feet high, getting it into the top 20 of the tallest buildings in Edinburgh. The building was restored between 1981 and 1985.
- Chambers Street Museum, Opened in 1866 and now, after combining other buildings, is known as the National Museum of Scotland and is one of Edinburgh's major.
- Edinburgh Festival Theatre, The former 'Empire' theatre, opened in 1892, although there has been a theatre on that site since 1830.
- McEwan Hall, Gifted to Edinburgh University by brewer William McEwan. Graduation and other ceremonies are held here.
- Central Mosque, Stone-built in 1998 on land provided by the council. Six years in construction.
- Royal Commonwealth Pool is located on what had been Nelson’s recreational field in Dalkeith Road. It was built by 1969 and was the venue for the 1970, 1986 and 2014 Commonwealth Games. It is a category-A-listed building. At its opening event in 1969, pupils from Preston Street primary and James Clark secondary schools were the first to use the pool.

== Notable residents of the Southside ==
The Southside, an historic student and intellectual hub, hosted many famous figures, including literary giants, scientists, artists, religious leaders and numerous academics and professionals associated with the nearby university.

Alex Arthur: Former World Boxing Organisation and World Boxing Association super featherweight champion, he was born in the Dumbiedykes and raised in Drummond Street.

Joseph Black: Physicist and chemist who discovered carbon dioxide, taught at the university, initially lived in the Southside on College Wynd and died at his home on 12 Nicolson Street.

Thomas Blacklock, the blind poet and patron of Robert Burns, lived and entertained many including Dr Samuel Johnson in Pear Tree House. He is buried in Buccleuch Parish Church graveyard.

David Bowie: resided briefly in a basement flat at 17 Drummond Street with Lindsay Kemp, dancer Jack Birkett and David's wife Angie after moving from a room in 66 St Mary's Street.

Thomas Braidwood: established the first school for deaf children in Britain in 1760 in Dumbiedykes Road.

Very Rev Charles John Brown: Minister and Moderator of the General Assembly for the Free Church of Scotland, lived at 15 Buccleuch Place.

Ronnie Browne: Folk musician and songwriter who was a founding member of The Corries, he was raised at 3 Moncrieff Terrace and in Buccleuch Street. Ronnie attended Preston Street School and made his first public singing appearance as a boy scout in a fundraising show at Nicolson Street Church.

Robert Burns: During the 17 months Burns lived in Edinburgh, he visited Thomas Blacklock at his home in West Nicolson Street and lodged with William Nicol in Buccleuch Pend..

Ron Butlin: is a Scottish poet and novelist who was Edinburgh Makar (Poet Laureate) and Regi Claire is a novelist, short story writer and poet who is married to Butlin. They have made their home in the Southside.

Eugene Marie Chantrelle: taught French at Newington Academy and he had a relationship with one of his pupils, Elizabeth Cullen Dyer whom he then married at age 17. They had a child together and after taking out an insurance policy on her life, he then murdered her. The trial coverage, his previous meeting with Chantrelle and the perceived respectability of the perpetrator is believed to have inspired Robert Louis Stevenson to write The Strange Case of Dr Jekyll and Mr Hyde.

Rev Patrick Clason: was a Scottish minister at Buccleuch Parish Church who served as Moderator of the General Assembly to the Free Church of Scotland, living near to his church at 23 Buccleuch Place. He died at his home in George Square in 1867.

Alison Cockburn: was a poet who collected a circle of eminent friends in 18th-century enlightenment Edinburgh including Walter Scott, Robert Burns and David Hume. Amongst other Edinburgh residences, she lived in Crichton Street off George Square. She is buried in the kirkyard of Buccleuch Parish Church.

Arthur Conan Doyle: The writer and physician was born in Edinburgh, he attended Newington Academy for schooling and lived in George Square as a medical student.

Helen Duncan: Acting as a spiritual medium, in 1944, she was one of the last people convicted under the Witchcraft Act 1735, which made falsely claiming to procure spirits a crime. She was sentenced to nine months' imprisonment and upon release, lived in Rankeillor Street and continued to act as a spiritualist until her death in 1956.

Very Rev William Henry Goold: - Born in and lived later at 28 Buccleuch Place, he was a minister of both the Reformed Presbyterian Church and the Free Church of Scotland and was Moderator of General Assembly of the Free Church in 1877.

Joseph Hislop: From the 1920s onwards, he was a lyric tenor who appeared in opera and oratorio and gave concerts around the world. He was born at 16 Bowmont Place in 1884, lived in Sweden for 30 years until 1948 and returned to Scotland, dying in Fife in 1977.

Richard Huie: Was a surgeon who served as president of the Royal College of Surgeons of Edinburgh. As a teenager, he lived in Crosscauseway and attended the High School in High School Yards. He lived later at 16 Nicolson Street, close to Surgeons Hall. His final home was at 8 George Square and he is buried in East Preston Street Burial Ground.

Allister Hutton: Elite long-distance runner who competed for Edinburgh Southern Harriers and Scotland in the 1980s and 1990s. He was Scottish National Cross-country champion in 1978 and 1982, and competed in three consecutive Commonwealth Games. He won the London Marathon in 1990. He lived at 32 East Preston Street.

James Hutton: played a key role in establishing geology as a modern science and was one of the most influential participants in the Scottish Enlightenment. He was educated at the High School, attended the University of Edinburgh and later built his family home in St John's Hill.

James Jamieson: was a dental surgeon, author and Fellow of the Royal Society of Edinburgh. Born at 52 Rankeillor Street, he later had two residences in George Square when he lectured for 20 years on dental disorders at the University of Edinburgh.

Rev. John Jamieson: minister of Nicolson Street Church, was the compiler of the first Scottish dictionary, published in 1808.

Francis Jeffrey: a judge who was born at 7 Charles Street, attended the Royal High School and studied at Glasgow, Oxford and law at Edinburgh university. At his home in Buccleuch Place, he was one of the parties, later being appointed Editor, who launched the Edinburgh Review in 1802 which became one of the most influential British magazines of the 19th century. He became an advocate and was chosen dean of the Faculty of Advocates, later becoming Lord Advocate. Jeffrey Street, in Edinburgh, is named after him.

Robert Knox: best known for his involvement in the Burke and Hare murders, was an anatomist and ethnologist. He was born in North Richmond Street, educated at the High School and Edinburgh University and was made a partner at an anatomy school in Surgeon's Square. He was living at 4 Newington Place when the chronic shortage of legitimate subjects for dissection, led to bodies being delivered to his dissecting rooms, having been murdered by Burke and Hare. Although not prosecuted, he left for London and is buried in Surrey.

Chic Murray: comedian and actor who made his home at 3 Montague Street with his wife Madie, herself an established theatre performer. "arguably the most influential Scottish comedian of the 20th century before Billy Connolly", he appeared on television, radio and films as well as theatre.

John Paterson: Scottish architect responsible for many grand buildings including 19c castles and assisting Robert Adam in 1789 with his work on Edinburgh University Old College. Just before his death in 1832 was living at 24 Buccleuch Place.

Walter Scott: A best-selling writer and poet, who was born in 1771 in College Wynd (Guthrie Street). He is associated with many locations in Edinburgh including residences in the Southside; High School Yards (site of the Royal High School) and 25 George Square (family residence) where he lived as a student from 1778 until his marriage in 1797.

Margaret Sinclair: was born at 3 West Arthur Place in 1900. She was baptised and later confirmed in St Patrick's Church which now contains the National Shrine of the Venerable Margaret Sinclair. Her father was a dustman and by 1911 the family were living in Geddes Entry (High Street). She was educated at St Anne's School in the Cowgate. By 1923 she joined the Order of Poor Clares at Notting Hill in London where she was given the name of Mary Francis of the Five Wounds. She died of tuberculosis in 1925 and is known as the "Edinburgh Wonder Worker". She was declared 'venerable' by Pope Paul VI in 1978 and her remains were initially interred in Mount Vernon Cemetery but are now in St Patrick's church as part of the National Shrine.

Andrew Usher: (1826 – 1898) was a prominent Scottish brewer and part of the Usher dynasty. He is considered the 'father of Scottish whisky'. With his brother Sir John Usher, he founded Andrew Usher & Co, Whisky Distilling and Blending. He lived at Pear Tree House in West Nicolson Street which later became the company headquarters.
