= East Preston Street Burial Ground =

Cemetery in Edinburgh, Scotland

Coordinates: 55°56′20″N 3°10′33″W

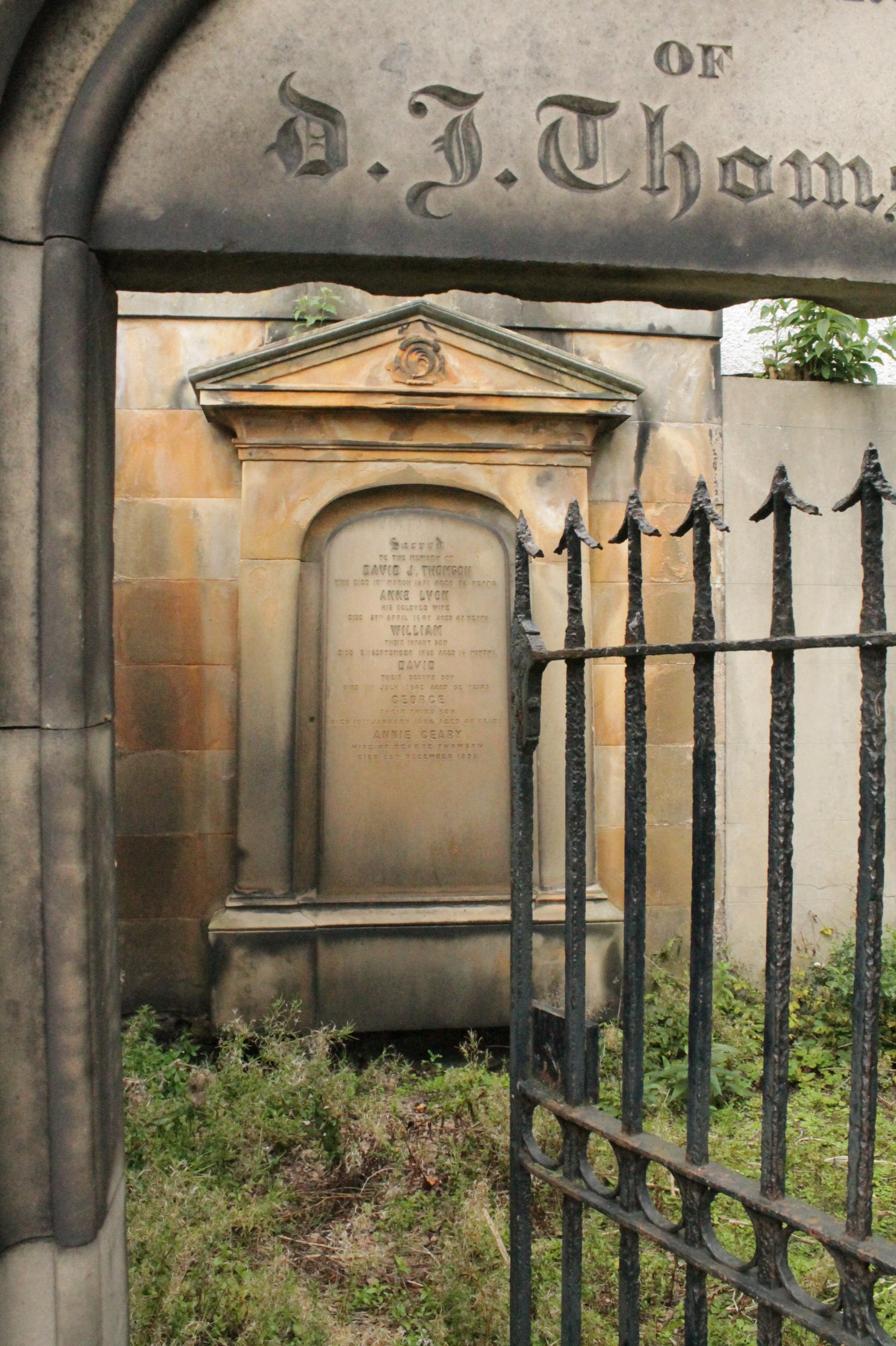
A burial vault at East Preston Street Burial Ground, Edinburgh

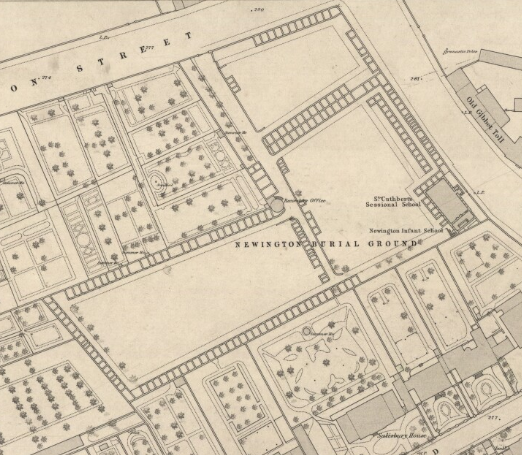
East Preston Street Burial Ground in 1845

East Preston Street Burial Ground is a burial ground in south Edinburgh holding graves from the 19th and 20th century. The graveyard is in the care of the City of Edinburgh Council. It stands at the junction of East Preston Street and Dalkeith Road. The property is a listed building.

== History ==
It was created in 1820 in the parish of St Cuthbert's, who had an overflow Chapel of Ease on Buccleuch Street, with its own graveyard. The additional burial ground was organised by the kirk session. It was originally called Newington Burial Ground but was renamed "East Preston Street" in 1848 on the opening of Newington Cemetery nearby.

The graveyard was necessitated by a major expansion of the city on its south side from around 1810.

It was designed with a small stone watchtower, positioned such as to view over the two legs of the cemetery, being built during the height of fears over graverobbing. Peripheral plots were built as enclosed stone vaults with iron bars on their top, for the same reason.

Operating largely as an "overflow" burial ground it lacked the kudos of other graveyards such as Greyfriars Kirkyard and operated largely for functional purposes. From 1842 its potential need greatly reduced due to the opening of Warriston Cemetery and Dean Cemetery which offered far more potential for a grand setting. Graves thereafter are largely limited to local tradesmen and their families.

== Notable interments ==
- Forrest Alexander (1759-1833) founder of the Commercial Bank of Scotland
- Rev Dr Robert Elder 1808-1892) Moderator of the Free Church of Scotland in 1871
- Rev Robert Gordon (1786-1853)
- Richard Huie (1795-1867) surgeon
- James Mercer of Scotsbank (d.1846)
- Hugh Pillans (1783-1852) printer with Pillans & Wilson
- Ronaldson memorial by Alexander Handyside Ritchie (1840)
- Andrew Usher (1782-1856) brewer, father of Andrew Usher
- Rev James Aitken Wylie (1808-1890)
