= List of graveyards and cemeteries in Edinburgh =

This is a list of graveyards, burial grounds and cemeteries in Edinburgh.

== Cemeteries in Council Control ==
See

- Colinton Cemetery
- Comely Bank Cemetery (previously private)
- Corstorphine Hill Cemetery (previously private) (includes a woodland cemetery section)
- Craigmillar Castle Park Cemetery (the most recent cemetery)
- Dalry Cemetery
- East Preston Street Burial Ground
- Grange Cemetery
- Jewish Cemetery, Sciennes House Place
- Kirkliston Cemetery
- Liberton Cemetery
- Morningside Cemetery (previously private)
- Mortonhall Cemetery and Crematorium
- New Calton Burial Ground, Regent Road
- Newington Cemetery (includes a large Jewish section)
- North Leith Burial Ground, Coburg Street
- North Merchiston Cemetery, Ardmillan Terrace (previously private)
- Old Calton Burial Ground, Waterloo Place/Regent Road
- Portobello Cemetery (includes a large Muslim section)
- Ratho Cemetery
- Rosebank Cemetery, Pilrig Street (includes a Sikh section)
- Saughton Cemetery, Chesser Loan (previously private)
- South Queensferry Cemetery
- Warriston Cemetery (previously private)
- Wauchope Burial Ground (also known as Niddrie Marishal Burial Ground), Greendykes Road

== Churchyards in Council Control ==
See

- Buccleuch Churchyard, Buccleuch Street
- Canongate Church
- Colinton Churchyard
- Corstorphine Parish Church
- Cramond Churchyard
- Currie Churchyard
- Dalmeny Churchyard
- Duddingston Churchyard
- Gogar Churchyard
- Greyfriars Kirkyard adjacent to Greyfriars Kirk
- Liberton Churchyard
- Ratho Churchyard
- Restalrig Churchyard
- St Cuthberts, Lothian Road
- St Mary and St James, Newhaven Main Street (small and ruinous)
- South Leith Parish Church
- Vennel, South Queensferry

== Cemeteries in Private Control ==
- Dean Cemetery
- Eastern Cemetery (off Easter Road)
- Mount Vernon RC Cemetery, controlled by Roman Catholic Archdiocese of St Andrews and Edinburgh
- Piershill Cemetery
- Seafield Cemetery and Crematorium
- Warriston Crematorium and Gardens of Remembrance

== Graveyards in Private/Church Control ==
See

- Holyrood Abbey (Historic Scotland)
- Holy Trinity Episcopal Church, Dean Bridge (small outer terraced area plus crypt below)
- North Leith Church, Madeira Street
- Portobello Old Parish Church, Pittville Street (most stones removed but previously vaults stood on all outer walls)
- Quaker graveyard, The Pleasance (University of Edinburgh)
- St Johns, Princes Street
- St Marks, Portobello
- Old Portobello Parish Church (Bellfield Street) partly built over, now in community use

== Wholly Destroyed Burial Grounds ==
- St Giles Cathedral Burial Ground (removed to build the Law Courts)
- St Nicholas (Citadel) Burial Ground in Leith removed to build Cromwell's Citadel
- Kirk o' Field Churchyard (now the central quadrangle of Old College)

== Bibliography ==
Golledge, Charlotte (2020). The Graveyards and Cemeteries of Edinburgh. Amberley Publishing. ISBN 978-1445694245.
