= James Aitken Wylie =

Scottish Presbyterian minister and historian of religion

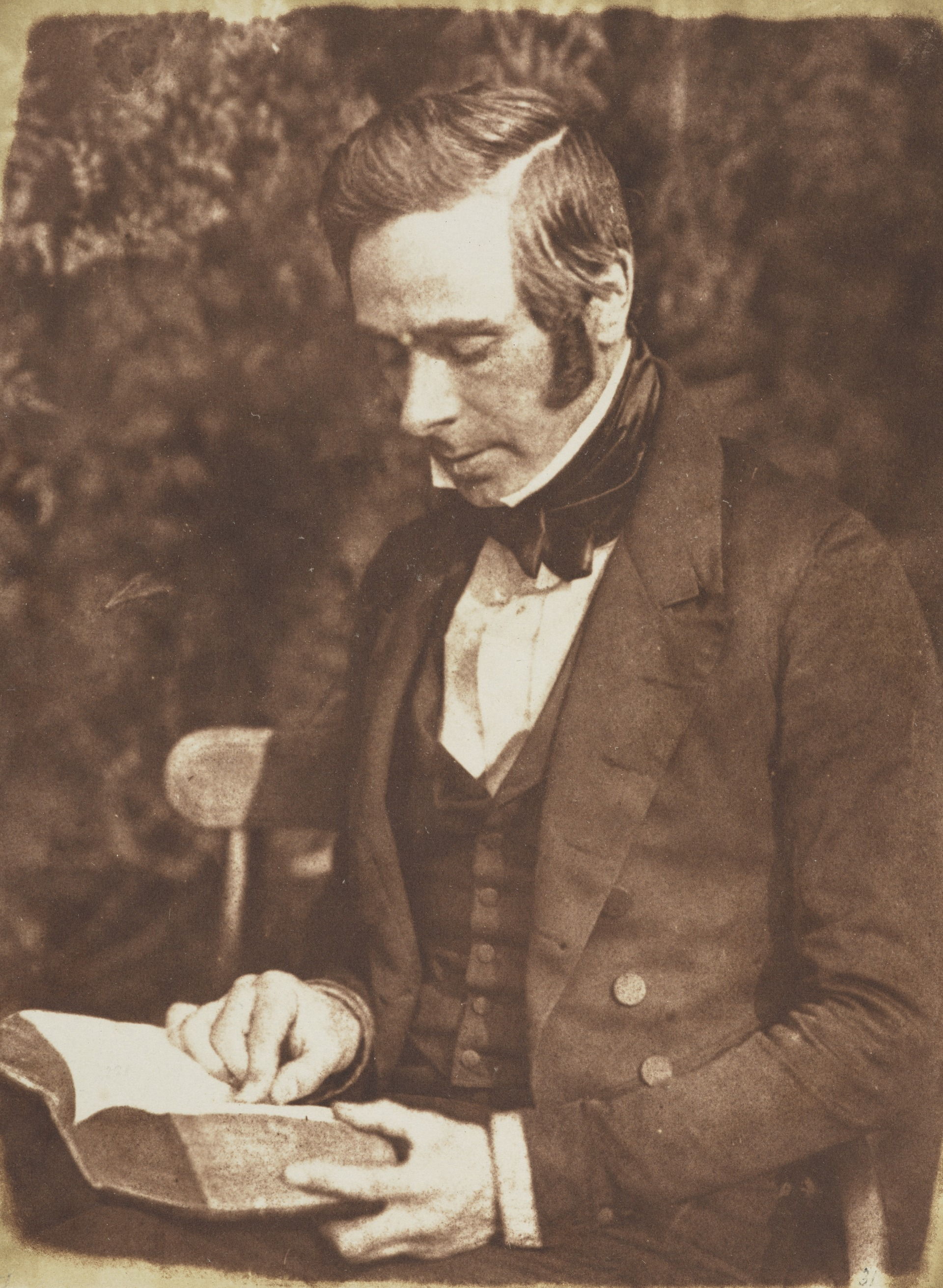
- photo by David Octavius Hill & Robert Adamson

Personal details
- Born: 9 August 1808 Kirriemuir
- Died: 1 May 1890 (aged 81) 12 Archibald Place
- Buried: East Preston Street Burial Ground, Edinburgh
- Education: St Andrews University

James Aitken Wylie (9 August 1808 – 1 May 1890) was a Scottish historian of religion and Presbyterian minister. He was a prolific writer and is most famous for writing The History of Protestantism.

== Life ==
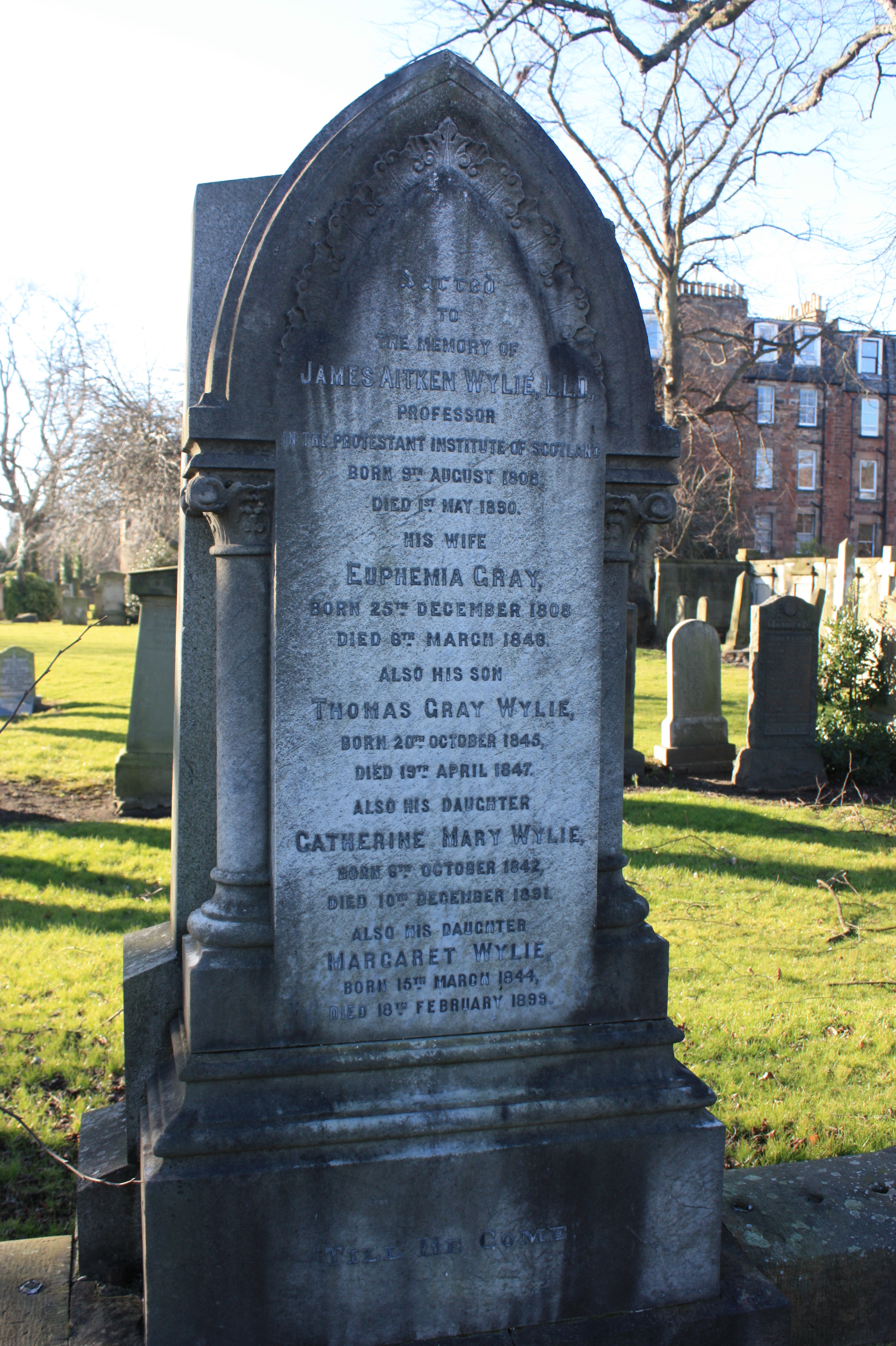
The grave of James Aitken Wylie, East Preston Street Burial Ground, Edinburgh

Wylie was born on 9 August 1808 in Kirriemuir to James Wylie and Margaret Forrest. His name-father, Rev James Aitken, was an Auld Licht Anti-burgher minister in the Secession Church. Wylie was educated at Marischal College, University of Aberdeen, where he studied for three years before transferring to St Andrews University to study under Rev Dr Thomas Chalmers. He followed his name-father's example, entering the Original Secession Divinity Hall, Edinburgh in 1827.

He was ordained at the Secessionist Church in Dollar, Clackmannanshire, in 1831.

In 1846 he left Dollar to become sub-editor of the Edinburgh religious newspaper the Witness, under Hugh Miller. In 1852, after he had (with the majority of the United Original Secession Church) joined the Free Church of Scotland, Wylie edited their Free Church Record, a role which he continued until 1860.

He published his book The Papacy: its History, Dogmas, Genius, and Prospects in 1851, winning a prize of a hundred guineas from the Evangelical Alliance. The Protestant Institute appointed him Lecturer on Popery in 1860. He continued in this role until his death in 1890, publishing in 1888 his work The Papacy is the Antichrist. He died with his History of the Scottish Nation taken forward to 1286.

Aberdeen University awarded him an honorary doctorate (LL.D.) in 1856.

Wylie's classic work, The History of Protestantism (1878), went out of print in the 1920s, although it was briefly reprinted in Northern Ireland in a two-volume reproduction in the late 20th century. It has received praise from a number of influential figures, including Ian Paisley. The History of Protestantism was also reprinted by Hartland Publications, Rapidan, Virginia, USA in 2002 in four volumes. ISBN 0-923309-80-2. It has now been re-published, as a 3-volume hardback set, by Reformation Heritage Books.

He died at 12 Archibald Place (next to the old Edinburgh Royal Infirmary on 1 May 1890. He is buried with his wife, Euphemia Gray (1808–1845) and their children, in East Preston Street Burial Ground. The grave lies in the eastern part of the south-east section.

== Publications ==
- The Seventh Vial, (1848) online ebook
- History of the Waldenses, (1880) ISBN 1-57258-185-9, online ebook
- Rome and civil liberty: or, The papal aggression in its relation to the sovereignty of the Queen and the independence of the nation, (1865), online ebook
- The Awakening of Italy and the Crisis of Rome. Religious Tract Society: London, (1866) Octavo.
- A Popish University for Ireland. The Irish Chief Secretary and the working classes. (1889). pp. 8. 22 cm.
- Character-its paramount influence on the happiness of individuals, and the destinies of society. In : Course. A Course of Lectures to young men ... delivered in Glasgow ... Second Series. Lect. 4. 1842. 12º.
- The Papacy: Its History, Dogmas, Genius, and Prospects — which was awarded a prize by the Evangelical Alliance in 1851. online pdf
- The rise, progress, and insidious workings of Jesuitism, (1877), online ebook
- The Jesuits: Their Moral Maxims and Plots Against Kings, Nations, and Churches, (1881).
- The History of Protestantism (1878). 3 vol. Cassell & Co.: London, 1899. Physical description: 8º. Shelfmark at British Library: 4650.g.2., online ebook
- The History of Protestantism (2018). 3 vol Inheritance Publications, Neerlandia AB Canada / Pella IA USA newly typeset Hard Cover edition http://www.inhpubl.net/ip/refo500.htm
- The History of The Scottish Nation in 3 volumes (1886) online pdf
- The Papacy is the Antichrist - A Demonstration (1888) online pdf
- Historical Sketch of the Free Church of Scotland
- Wylie JA, ed. Life and Missionary Travels of the Rev. J. Furniss Ogle M.A., from His Letters. Ogle JF. Cambridge Library Collection - Religion. Cambridge: Cambridge University Press; 2012:88-96. doi:10.1017/CBO9781139177641.010
- The Household Bible Dictionary (1870) vol.1 (A-E) vol.2 (F-Z).

== Sources ==
- Howie, John (1875a). Wylie, James Aitken (ed.). The Scots Worthies; their lives and testimonies, including many additional notes, and lives of eminent Worthies not contained in the original collection. Edited by J.A. Wylie, assisted by James Anderson, with an introductory sketch of the history of the period by the editor. Vol. 1. London: W. MacKenzie.
- Howie, John (1875b). Wylie, James Aitken (ed.). The Scots Worthies; their lives and testimonies, including many additional notes, and lives of eminent Worthies not contained in the original collection. Edited by J.A. Wylie, assisted by James Anderson, with an introductory sketch of the history of the period by the editor. Vol. 2. London: W. MacKenzie.
- Mackelvie, William (1873). Annals and statistics of the United Presbyterian Church. Edinburgh : Oliphant and A. Elliot; Glasgow : D. Robertson.
- McKerrow, John (1839a). History of the Secession Church. Vol. 1. Edinburgh: William Oliphant and Son.
- McKerrow, John (1839b). History of the Secession Church. Vol. 2. Edinburgh: William Oliphant and Son.
- Scott, David (1886). Annals and statistics of the original Secession church: till its disruption and union with the Free church of Scotland in 1852. Edinburgh : A. Elliot.
- Small, Robert (1904a). History of the congregations of the United Presbyterian Church, from 1733 to 1900. Vol. 1. Edinburgh: David M. Small.
- Small, Robert (1904b). History of the congregations of the United Presbyterian Church, from 1733 to 1900. Vol. 2. Edinburgh: David M. Small.
- Thomson, Andrew; Struthers, Gavin (1858). Historical sketch of the origin of the Secession Church and the History of the rise of the Relief Church. Edinburgh and London: A. Fullerton and Co.
- Wylie, James Aitken, ed. (1881). Disruption worthies : a memorial of 1843, with an historical sketch of the free church of Scotland from 1843 down to the present time. Edinburgh: T. C. Jack.
