= Regi Claire =

Swiss writer

- Claire in 2020
- Born: Muenchwilen, Thurgau Canton, Switzerland
- Occupations: novelist, short story writer, poet

Regi Claire (born Muenchwilen, Thurgau Canton, Switzerland), is a novelist, short story writer and poet living and working in Scotland. Her native language is Swiss-German, but she writes in English, her fourth language.

== Life ==
Regi Claire studied English and German at the University of Zurich and University of Aberdeen, the latter on an exchange scholarship, then became a PhD student/research assistant at University of Zurich.

She is the author of four published books: two novels and two collections of short stories. Her first collection, Inside ~ Outside, published in 1998 by Scottish Cultural Press, and the second, Fighting It, published by Two Ravens Press in 2009, were both shortlisted for Saltire Scottish Book of the Year awards. Fighting It was also longlisted for the Edge Hill Prize. Her first novel, The Beauty Room, published in 2002 by Polygon/EUP, was longlisted for MIND Book of the Year. Her second novel, The Waiting, published in 2012 by Word Power Books, won a UBS Cultural Foundation award.

Her first poem, '(Un)certainties', won 1st prize in the Mslexia/Poetry Book Society Women's Poetry Competition 2019 and is currently shortlisted for the Forward Prize for Best Single Poem 2020.

Her first published short story won 1st prize in the Edinburgh Review 10th Anniversary Short Story Competition in 1995. A later story was the Guardian newspaper's Radio Pick of the Day and another, 'The Tasting', was selected for Best British Short Stories 2013. She is a Cadenza magazine prizewinner, was shortlisted for Eyelands 9th International Short Story Contest 2019 (Greece) and has received bursaries from the Scottish Arts Council, Pro Helvetia (Swiss Arts Council) and Thurgau Lottery Fund.

She was a Royal Literary Fund Fellow at Queen Margaret University, Edinburgh, from 2012-2015, and a Royal Literary Fund Lector for Reading Round Scotland from 2015-2017. A former creative writing tutor at the National Gallery of Scotland, she currently teaches creative writing at Edinburgh City Art Centre and is a teaching fellow in critical reading at the Centre for Open Learning at Edinburgh University.

She has collaborated with her husband, Ron Butlin, on poetry translations for the Scottish Poetry Library and the Goethe Institut. Publications include: The Night Begins with a Question: XXV Austrian Poems 1978-2002 (Carcanet, 2007); Fife Lines: Poetry from Switzerland (2002); orte: Brücke nach Edinburgh (Switzerland, 1996).

She is a member of Society of Authors, Autorinnen und Autoren der Schweiz, Scottish PEN (where she served on the Executive Committee and the Writers at Risk Committee for several years), Dove Tales, Poetry Association of Scotland (honorary) and Swiss Club Edinburgh (honorary).

== Family ==
She lives in Edinburgh, Scotland, with her husband, the writer Ron Butlin.

== Works ==
- orte: Brücke nach Edinburgh (Switzerland, 1996)
- Inside-Outside: Stories, Edinburgh: Scottish Cultural Press, 1998. ISBN 9781840170238, OCLC 41894669
- The Beauty Room, Edinburgh: Polygon/Edinburgh University Press, 2002. ISBN 9780748663224, OCLC 59417565
- Tom Hubbard (ed) Fife Lines: Poetry from Switzerland; with translations by Scottish poets, Glenrothes: Russel Trust, 2002. OCLC 742488083
- Iain Galbraith (ed) The Night Begins with a Question: XXV Austrian Poems 1978-2002, Carcanet, 2007. OCLC 123271841
- Fighting it, Ullapool: Two Ravens, 2009. ISBN 9781906120412, OCLC 317254562
- The Waiting, Edinburgh: Word Power, 2012. ISBN 9780956628381, OCLC 820782559
- The Beauty Room. Birlinn. 2013. ISBN 978-0-85790-779-0. OCLC 865330725
