= James Pillans =

Scottish classical scholar and educational reformer

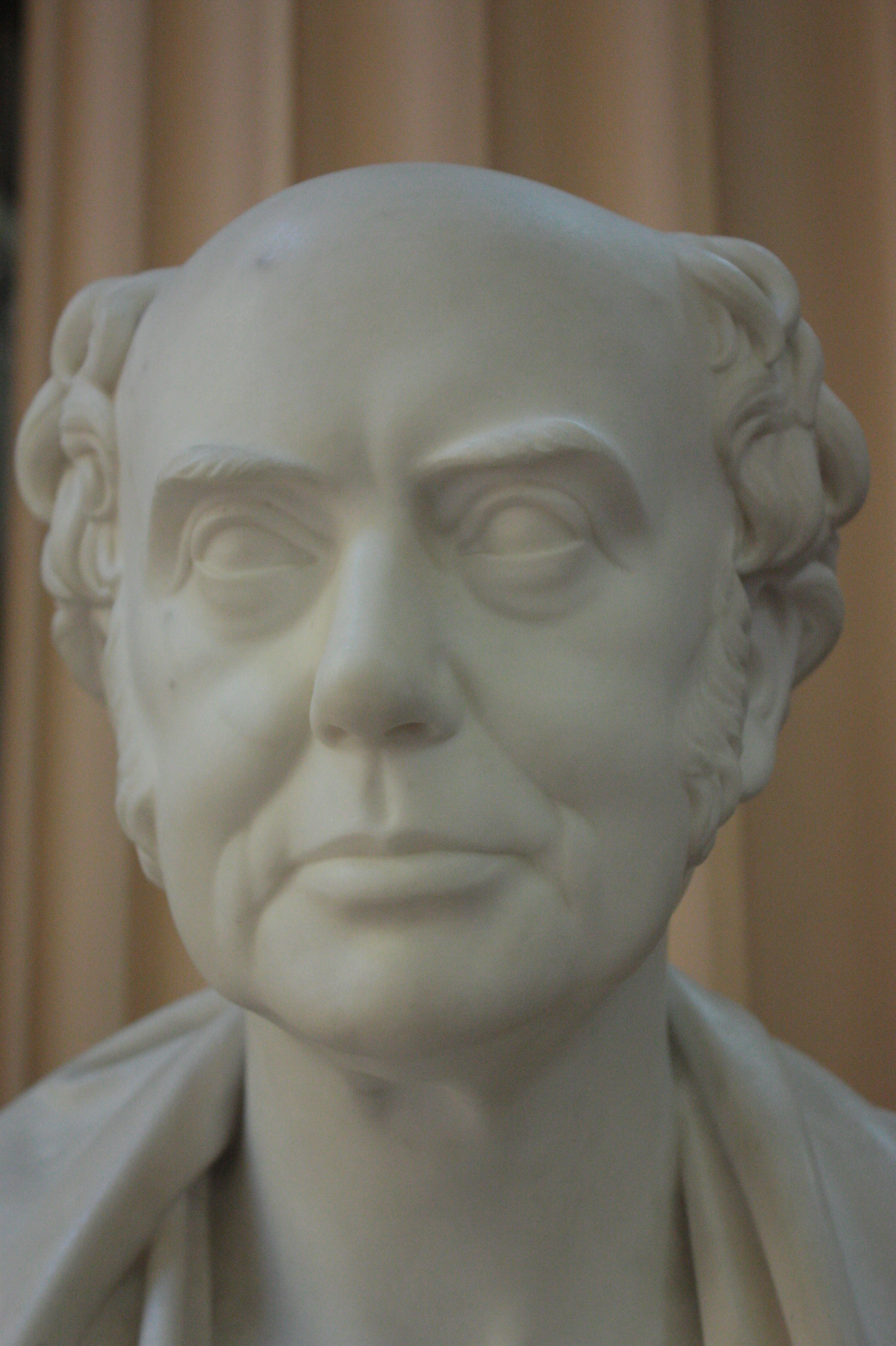
Bust of Prof James Pillans by Peter Slater, 1852, Old College, University of Edinburgh

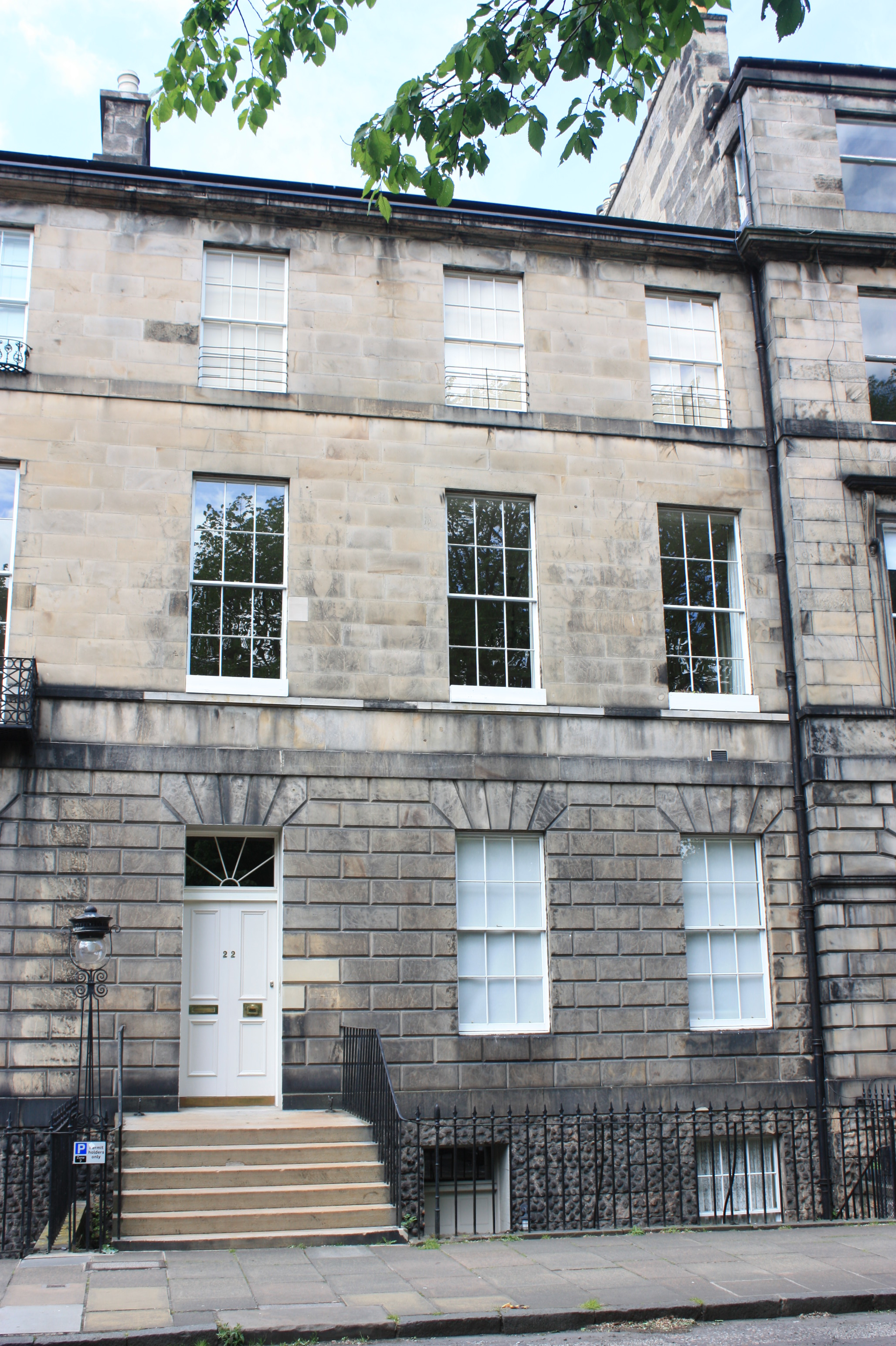
Pillans home at 22 Abercromby Place, Edinburgh

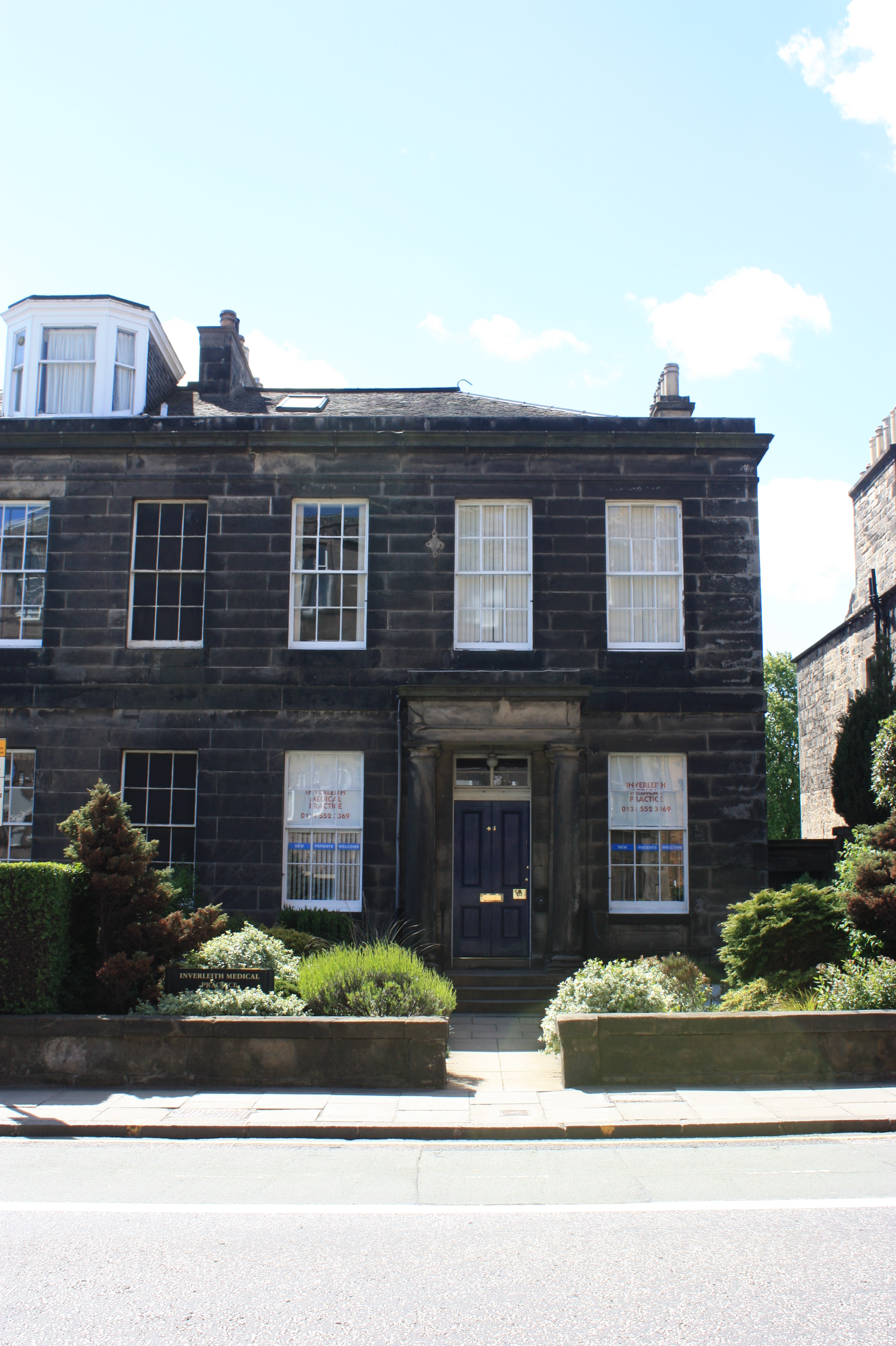
Pillans home at 43 Inverleith Row, Edinburgh

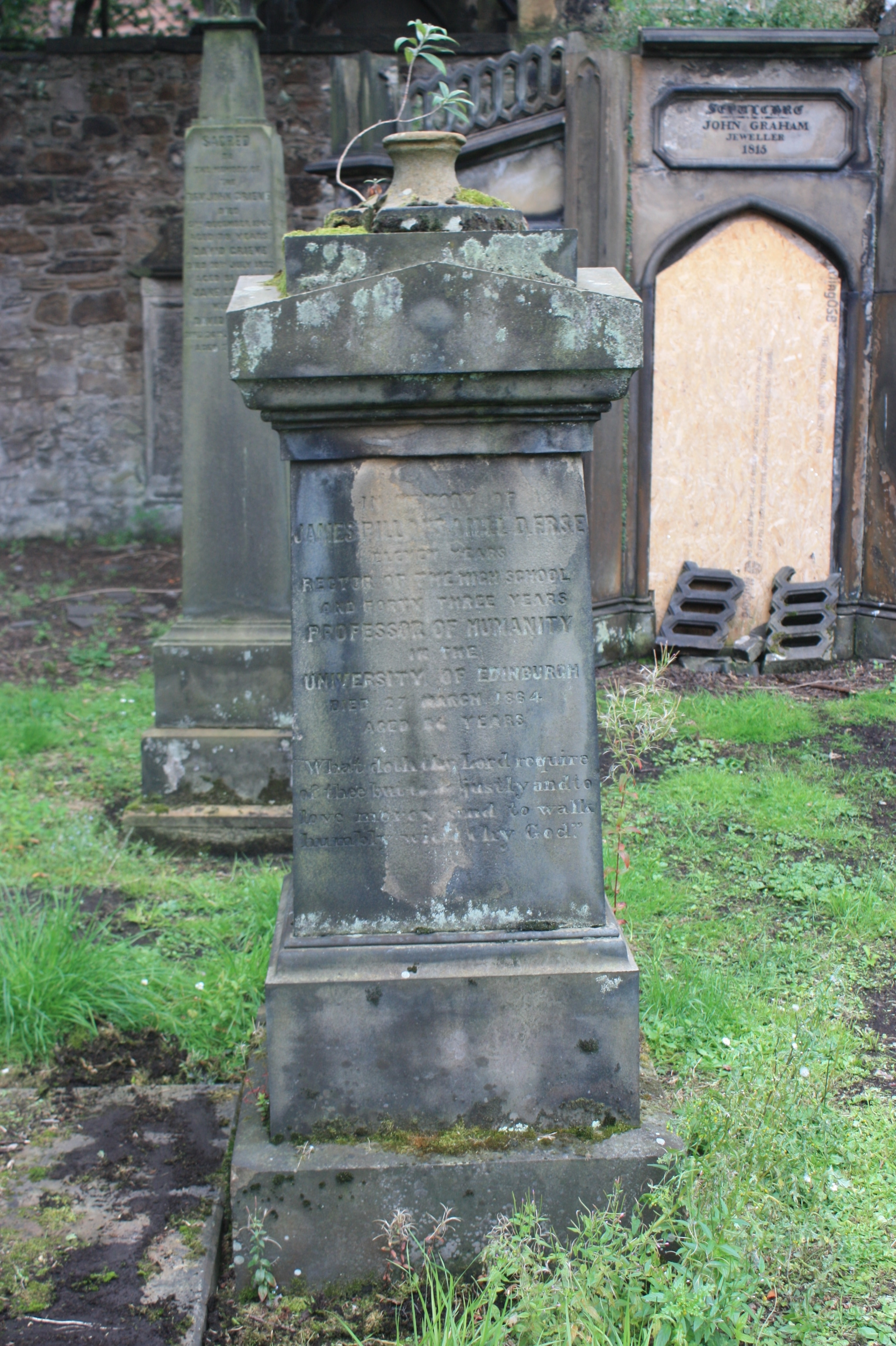
Grave of James Pillans, St Cuthberts Churchyard, Edinburgh

James Pillans FRSE (1778–1864) was a Scottish classical scholar, Professor of Humanity at the University of Edinburgh, and educational reformer. He is credited with inventing the blackboard, alongside his colleague Jack Smart but more correctly was the inventor of coloured chalk.

== Early life ==
The son of James Pillans, he was born at Sheriff Brae in Leith in April 1778. His father was a merchant and then a printer in Edinburgh, creating Pillans & Wilson. He was also an elder in the Anti-Burgher branch of the Scottish Secession Church, of Adam Gib, and a liberal in politics. Pillans was educated at the Royal High School, Edinburgh, under Alexander Adam, of whom he subsequently contributed a biography to the Encyclopædia Britannica. He was second in the rector's class, after his close friend Francis Horner; another classmate was John Archibald Murray.

His father wished to apprentice him to a paper-stainer, but Pillans went on to the University of Edinburgh, where he graduated with an MA on 30 January 1801. He became a pupil of Andrew Dalzell, was influenced by Dugald Stewart, and attended the chemistry lectures of Joseph Black. He was a member of the "dialectic society" founded by "Burgher" divinity students in the university. After graduation he acted as tutor, first to Thomas Francis Kennedy at Dunure, Ayrshire, next in a family in Northumberland, where he had the opportunity of speaking French. He then moved to Eton, as a private tutor.

== Educator ==
On the death of Adam (13 December 1809), Pillans offered himself as a candidate for the rectorship of the Edinburgh High School. With the support of Robert Blair, Lord Avontoun he was chosen over Luke Fraser, the internal candidate, despite his Whig politics which counted against him with the Tory town council. In January 1810 Pillans entered on his duties in the old high school, on Infirmary Street, with a class of 144 boys. At the outset he used the tawse, which he later gave up.

Pillans introduced a version of the Bell–Lancaster monitorial system, and his class doubled its numbers. His reputation attracted pupils from far and wide. Another Lancasterian at the High School at this period was James Gray.

Pillans developed the teaching of classical Greek, which had been begun by Christison in Adam's time; and encouraged the study of classical geography. His pupil John Brown Patterson became known as a classical scholar; other pupils were Robert Christison and Cosmo Nelson Innes.

== Academic ==
In 1820 the chair of "humanity and laws" (in effect Latin) at the University of Edinburgh was vacated by the death of Alexander Christison. Pillans was elected his successor, and occupied the chair for over 53 years. His position as Rector of the High School was filled by Aglionby Ross Carson.

He carried over some of the ideas which he had applied in the High School. He still taught elementary Latin. He believed that universities should supply elementary teaching in classics, and opposed, with Philip Kelland and others, the institution (May 1855) of an entrance examination to the junior Greek class, though he was in favour of an examination for admission to higher classes. He enlarged the conventional range of classical authors proposed for study.

Pillans lectured on "universal grammar" and the laws of the twelve tables. A prize was awarded for English recitation; among those who gained it was Fox Maule, who joined the class when he was quartered with his regiment in Edinburgh Castle. Pillans was one of the first to teach the revised pronunciation of Latin, though in practice he conformed to the usual Scottish way.

== Reformer ==
During vacations Pillans investigated education in Scotland, and compared it with other countries. He made tours to inspect the systems of Prussia, France, Switzerland, and Ireland.

During the 1830s Pillans is listed as living at 22 Abercromby Place in Edinburgh's Second New Town.

Pillans gave evidence to the committee of the House of Commons on education in 1834: on religious education (p. 218), infant schools (p. 227), and teacher training (p. 231). He was an early advocate for compulsory education, wrote in defence of the classical training, and had advanced views on popular education. He became president of the Watt Institution and School of Arts, inaugurating in 1854 the statue of James Watt then in Adam Square.

== Last years ==
Pillans resigned at the close of his 85th year, and took formal leave of the University on 11 April 1863. The degree of LL.D. was conferred upon him on 22 April.

He died at his residence, 43 Inverleith Row, on 27 March 1864. He was buried on 1 April in the graveyard of St Cuthbert's Church, Edinburgh. His grave lies at the west end of the north extension and is beginning to erode.

== Works ==
Pillans wrote for the Edinburgh Review from 1804, after an introduction by Horner. Unfavourable comments on the Juvenal translation of Francis Hodgson earned him a swipe in English Bards and Scotch Reviewers.

=== Educational writings ===
A letter from Pillans appeared in Jeremy Bentham's Chrestomathia (1815). It was entitled Successful application of the new system to language-learning, and dated 1814; it mentions the use of chalk and blackboard in teaching geography. It was followed by a letter from his Edinburgh High School colleague James Gray.

Letters on the Principles of Elementary Teaching (Edinburgh, 1827; 1828; 1855), based on correspondence with his former pupil Kennedy of Dunure, was the statement of Pillans of his method based on his work at the High School, with criticism of the educational state of Scotland. This book proved controversial, being attacked in Letters addressed to the Parochial Schoolmasters of Scotland (1829), reviewed negatively in the Edinburgh Literary Journal which defended Pillans. In the same year a long article in the Quarterly Review vol. LXXVII on elementary teaching called the work of Pillans "very sensible" (p. 114), while advocating the "Bell system" of the National Society schools (p. 120), i.e. Andrew Bell's version of the monitorial system. The review was in fact by Bell, who had met Pillans not long before, and felt that the variant of the "system" that was described in the Letters did not do justice to his own ideas. Pillans then defended himself and the rival claims of Joseph Lancaster's system; and was endorsed by the Eclectic Review. The principles brought up by Pillans entered the secondary literature.

Contributions to the Cause of Education (1856), dedicated to Lord John Russell, included reprints of earlier works. It also comprised articles in the Edinburgh Review, minutes of evidence, and other material. The blackboard method of "chalk and talk" teaching is also mentioned.

Pillans published also:

- Three Lectures on the Proper Objects and Methods of Instruction, 1836; and 1854.
- A Word for the Universities of Scotland, 1848.
- The Rationale of Discipline, 1852 (written in 1823). Online text.
- Educational Papers, 1862.

=== Classical studies and geography ===
- Eclogæ Ciceronianæ, 1845 (includes selections from Pliny's letters).
- A Discourse on the Latin Authors read … in the earlier Stages of Classical Discipline, 1847.
- Outlines of Geography, 1847.
- Excerpta ex Taciti Annalibus, 1848.
- The Five Latter Books of the First Decade of Livy, 1849; 1857
- First Steps in the Physical and Classical Geography of the Ancient World, 1853; 10th ed. 1873 (edited by T. Fawcett); 13th ed. 1882.
- Elements of Physical and Classical Geography, 1854.

His time at Eton led Pillans to value Latin verse composition, which in Scotland was a lost art. A volume of the compositions of his class appeared as Ex Tentaminibus Metricis … in Schola Regia Edinensi … electa, Edinburgh, 1812, dedicated to Joseph Goodall. It was favourably noticed in the Edinburgh Review (November 1812), but criticised by Robert Southey (or Walter Scott) in the Quarterly Review (December 1812).

== Family ==
Pillans married Helen Thomson (1786-1840), second daughter of Rev Thomas Thomson, minister of Dailly, Ayrshire, sister of Thomas Thomson and John Thomson of Duddingston, but was early left a widower without children.

Helen is buried separately from James Pillans but lies in the same section of St Cuthbert's Churchyard, against a wall to the south-east of his grave.

== Bibliography ==
- Foakes, R. A. ""Thriving Prisoners": Coleridge, Wordsworth and the Child at School". Studies in Romanticism. 28 (2 (Summer 1989)). Boston University: 187–206. doi:10.2307/25600772. JSTOR 25600772.
