= Ron Butlin =

Scottish poet and novelist (born 1949)

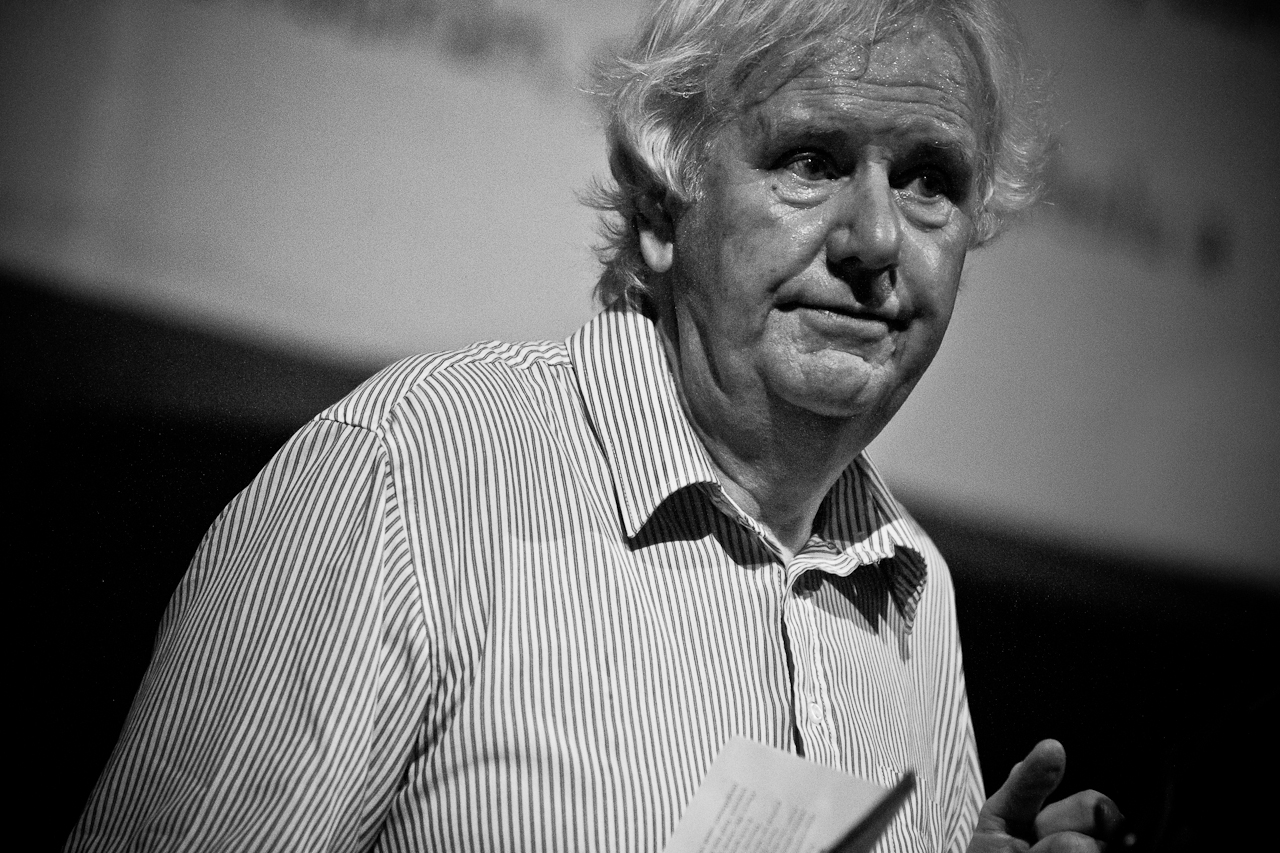
Ron Butlin

Ron Butlin (born 1949 in Edinburgh) is a Scottish poet and novelist who was Edinburgh Makar (Poet Laureate) from 2008 to 2014.

== Education ==
Butlin was educated at the University of Edinburgh. He later became writer in residence in 1982 and 1984 at the university.

== Career ==
Butlin has written several novels, collections of short stories, poems and plays. His work has been widely anthologised in Britain and abroad, and translated into over a dozen languages. His debut novel, The Sound of My Voice, was republished in 2002 with an introduction by Irvine Welsh who called it "one of the greatest pieces of fiction to come out of Britain in the Eighties".

He has written seven libretti for opera, mostly for Scottish Opera, and frequently in collaboration with composer Lyell Cresswell.

Ron Butlin's literary archive is held at the National Library of Scotland.

== Private life ==
Butlin is married to the Scottish-Swiss novelist and short story writer Regi Claire.

== Bibliography ==
Novels

- The Sound of My Voice (1987)
- Night Visits (1997)
- Belonging (2006)
- Ghost Moon (2014)

Short story collections

- The Tilting Room (1983)
- Vivaldi and the Number 3 and Other Impossible Stories (2004)
- No More Angels (2007)

Poetry

- The Wonnerfuu Warld o John Milton (1974)
- Stretto (1976)
- Creatures Tamed by Cruelty (1979)
- The Exquisite Instrument: Imitations from the Chinese (1982)
- Ragtime in Unforgettable Bars (1985)
- Histories of Desire (1995)
- Without a Backward Glance (2005)
- The Magicians of Edinburgh (2012)
- The Magicians of Scotland (2015)
- Here Come the Trolls! (verse for children, 2015)
- The Offering (2017)

Opera

- Markheim
- Dark Kingdom
- Faraway Pictures
- Good Angel, Bad Angel
- The Perfect Woman
- The Money Man
- Wedlock
