= Andrew Usher =

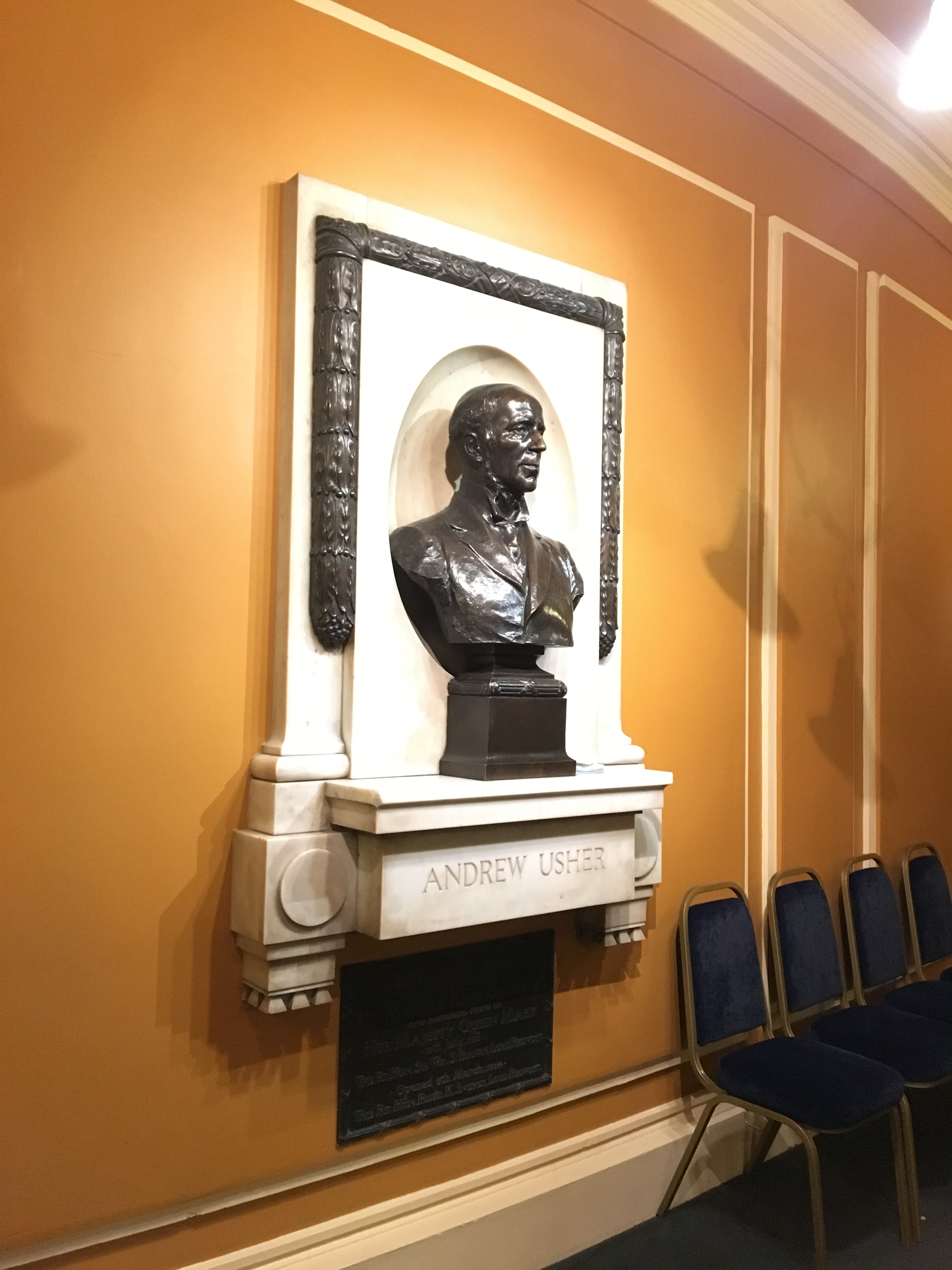
- Born: 5 January 1826
- Died: 1 November 1898 (aged 72)
- Citizenship: British

Andrew Usher II (5 January 1826 – 1 November 1898) was a Scottish whisky distiller and blender.

== Background ==
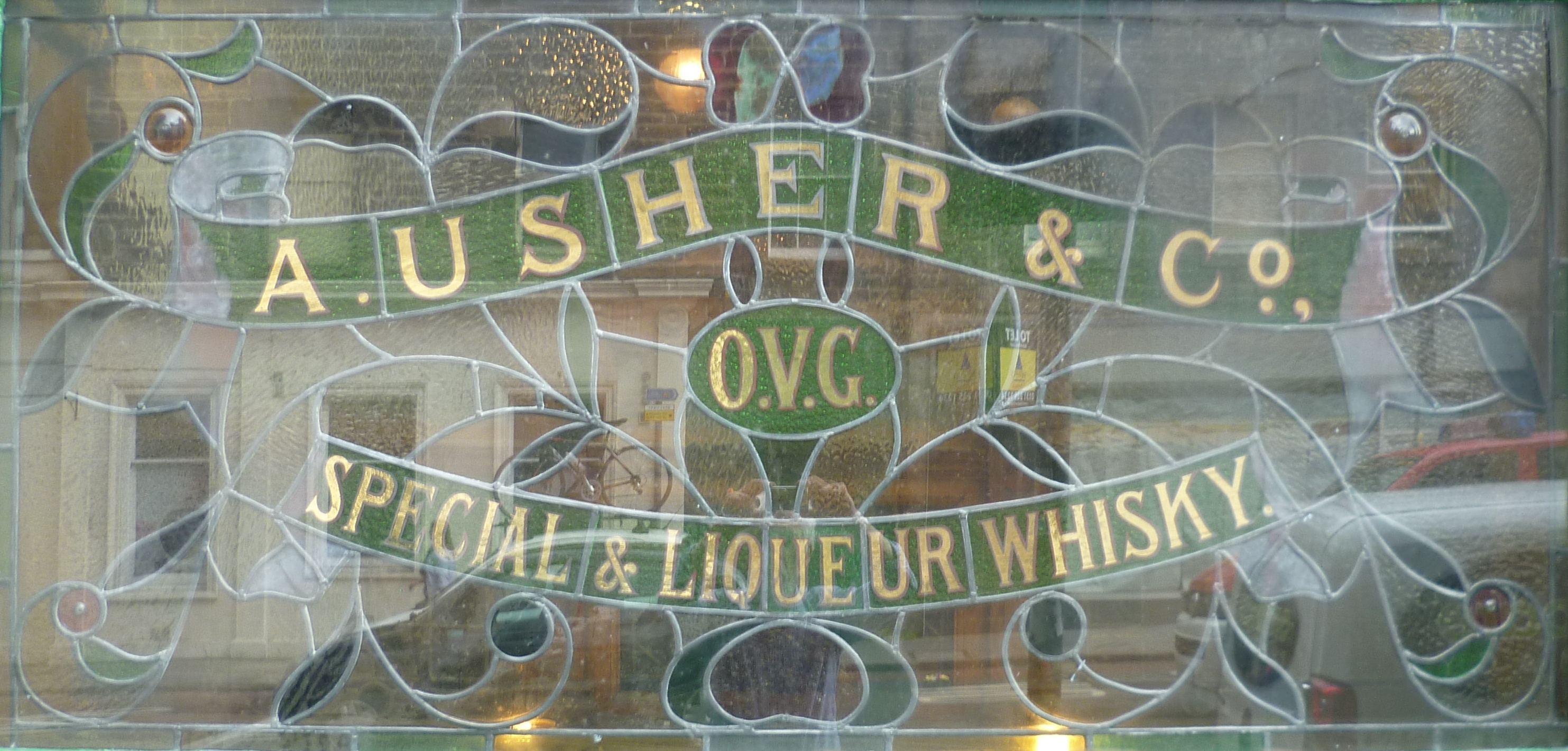
Usher & Co window advertisement, Edinburgh

Usher's father, whose name he shared, Andrew Usher (1782 – 1855), was a prominent Scottish brewer who had experimented with the blending of whisky in the 1840s. He had two sons, Andrew II and John. Andrew Usher II was made a partner of Andrew Usher & Co of Edinburgh in the late 1840s. He was also the grandson of James Usher of Toftfield who sold the property to Sir Walter Scott who bought it for his close friend Adam Ferguson and re- named the house Huntly Burn. Andrew Usher II perfected the eventual blending of whisky and as such is sometimes called the 'father of Scottish whisky'. The subsequent blending and mass distillation enabled whisky to grow from a drink rarely consumed outside the United Kingdom, to be one of mass export.

Andrew Usher II was one of the three founders of the North British Distillery; the other two were John Crabbie of Crabbie's Green Ginger and William Sanderson, whisky blender of Vat 69, who both served as directors of the NB distillery. Andrew Usher II was the first Chairman of the NB Distillery, serving from its start in 1885 until shortly before his death on 1 November 1898. Andrew Usher II and his brother John Usher, as partners in Andrew Usher & Co, were also the proprietors of the Edinburgh Distillery.

== Philanthropy ==
Among his many bequests to Edinburgh and Scotland was the Usher Hall, which became Scotland's premier concert hall. It is recorded that he donated £100,000 to the city specifically to fund the new concert hall on 23 June 1896. A bust of Usher is located in the hall at the entrance to the Grand Circle. He died before the hall was completed and it was later opened by his widow.

Usher also played a major role in improving the fishing village and harbour of St Abbs in Berwickshire. He purchased the Northfield estate on the edge of the village, enlarging and finishing the building of a countryside manor by the coastal shore in 1892. He considered the local public hall inadequate and subsequently funded a new village hall and school, which was constructed in 1887 and is now occupied by the St Abbs visitor centre. Usher also gave funds for the building of the local church in 1892 and the extension of the outer harbour wall in 1890.

== Death ==
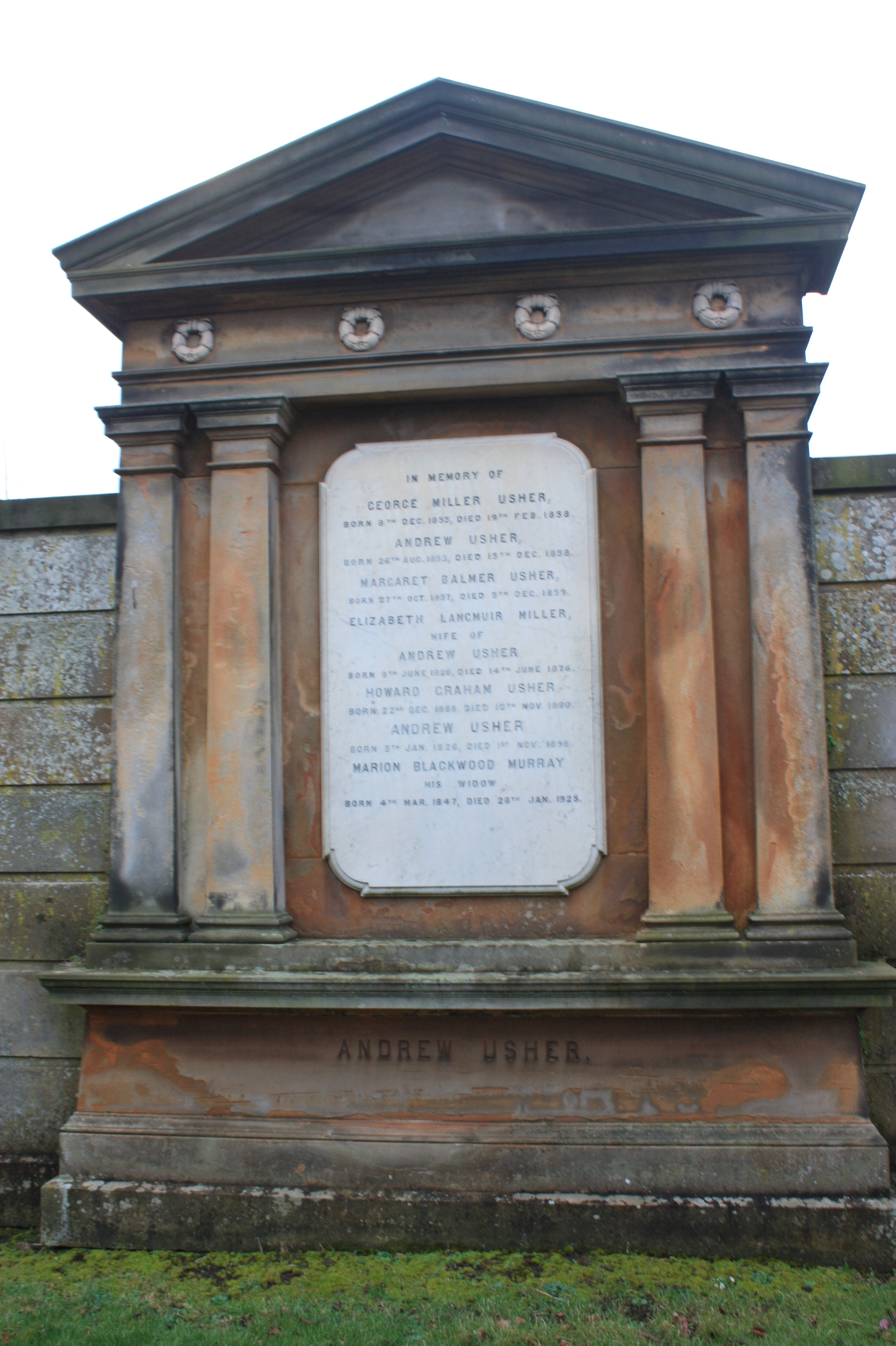
The grave of Andrew Usher, Grange Cemetery, Edinburgh

Usher is buried in the Grange Cemetery, Edinburgh with his first wife, Elizabeth Langmuir Miller (1826-1876); his second wife, Marion Blackwood Murray (1847-1925); and several of his children. Usher's city centre family house is now a converted pub (named the Pear Tree and Andrew Usher & Co) located near the University of Edinburgh.
