= Pillans & Wilson =

Pillans and Wilson was an Edinburgh printers operating from the Scottish Enlightenment onwards, with a number of well-known clients. They existed from 1775 to 2002.

== History ==
The firm was founded by James Pillans (b.1745 and father of Prof. James Pillans) in 1775. It began in a tenement in Edinburgh's South Side but moved to Hastie's Close soon after. It then moved to Riddles Court on the Lawnmarket off the Royal Mile. In 1788 it was renamed Pillans and Son when Hugh Pillans (1783-1852) joined the firm.

When James Pillans died, his second son Hugh Pillans took over, and in 1827 he merged with his younger brother John Pillans and moved to new premises (H and J Pillans) at James Court on the opposite side of the Lawnmarket. This building was destroyed by fire in 1857 but they found alternative premises on James Court and stayed there until 1877 when they moved to 18 Thistle Street in the New Town. By this stage the "H" in H & J Pillans was Hugh Scott Pillans (1824–1894).

In 1890, they were joined by W. Scott Wilson to create the firm Pillans & Wilson, extending (on the Thistle St site) in 1892. By the First World War they also ran a stationery shop at 86 Hanover Street. In 1918 they moved to the Newington Works at 20 Bernard Terrace. Despite the creation of "Pillans & Wilson" many publications continue to appear just as "H & J Pillans".

In the 20th century, the firm passed to Robert Wilson FRSE (1876–1952) who was also President of the Edinburgh Chamber of Commerce from 1932 to 1934.

In 1996, they became a Limited Company: Pillans & Wilson Ltd.

In 2002 the company merged with Waddies of Livingston, West Lothian creating Pillans & Waddies. Sadly this expansion was short-lived, as it timed with a shrinking in publishing due to the internet, and the company closed in 2006 with the loss of 240 jobs. However, the name Pillans & Wilson is kept alive as a trading name, Pillans & Wilson Greenaway, based now in a small office on Leith Walk.

== Publications ==
As H & J Pillans

- Publications of James Pillans
- Publications of the Bannatyne Club
- The Hydra

As Pillans & Wilson

- Legal documents for the High Court and Edinburgh legal profession
- Company records for Edinburgh firms
