= William Maxwell Hetherington =

Scottish minister, poet and church historian

William Hetherington
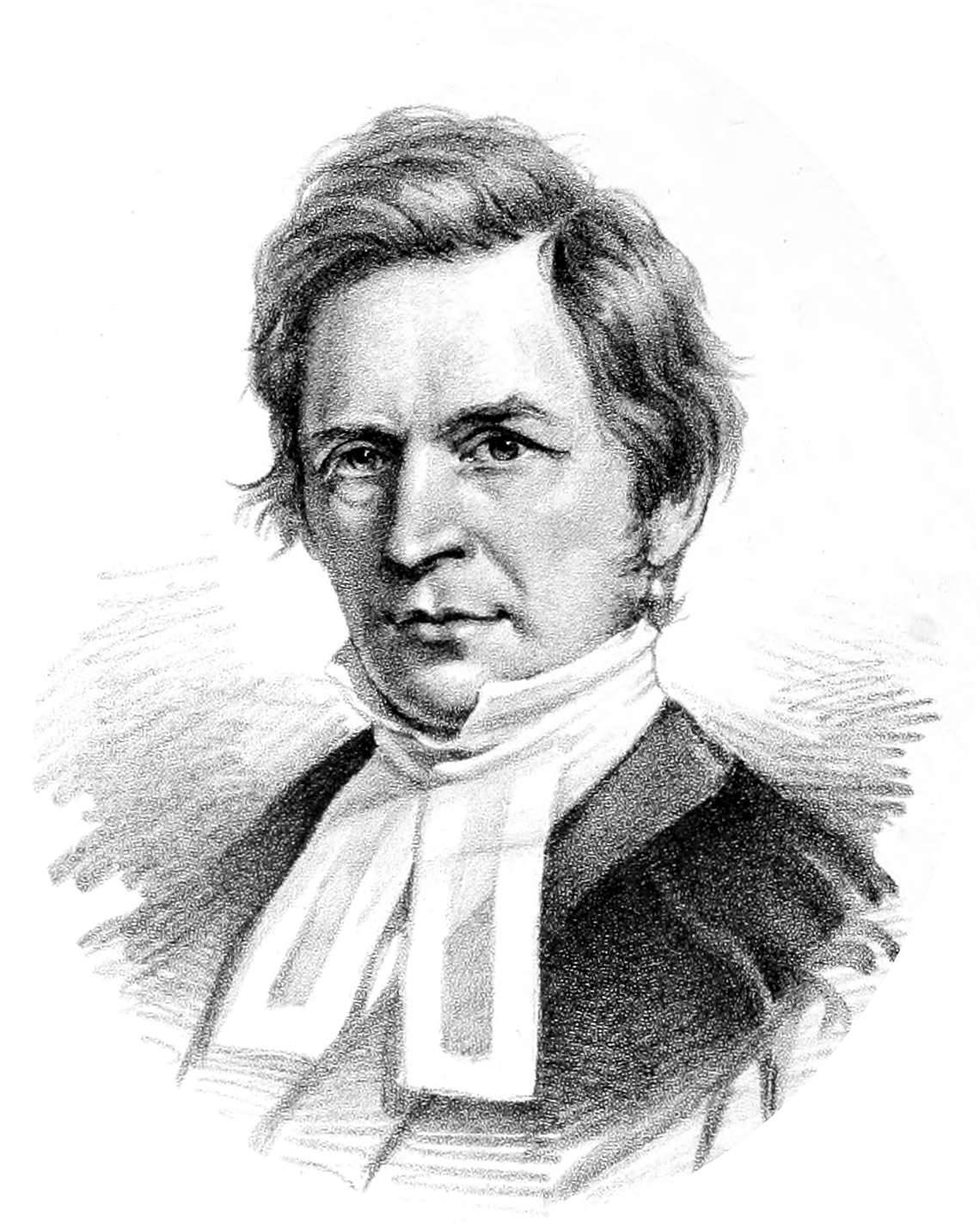
- William Hetherington from Disruption Worthies

Personal details
- Born: 4 June 1803
- Died: 23 May 1865 (aged 61)

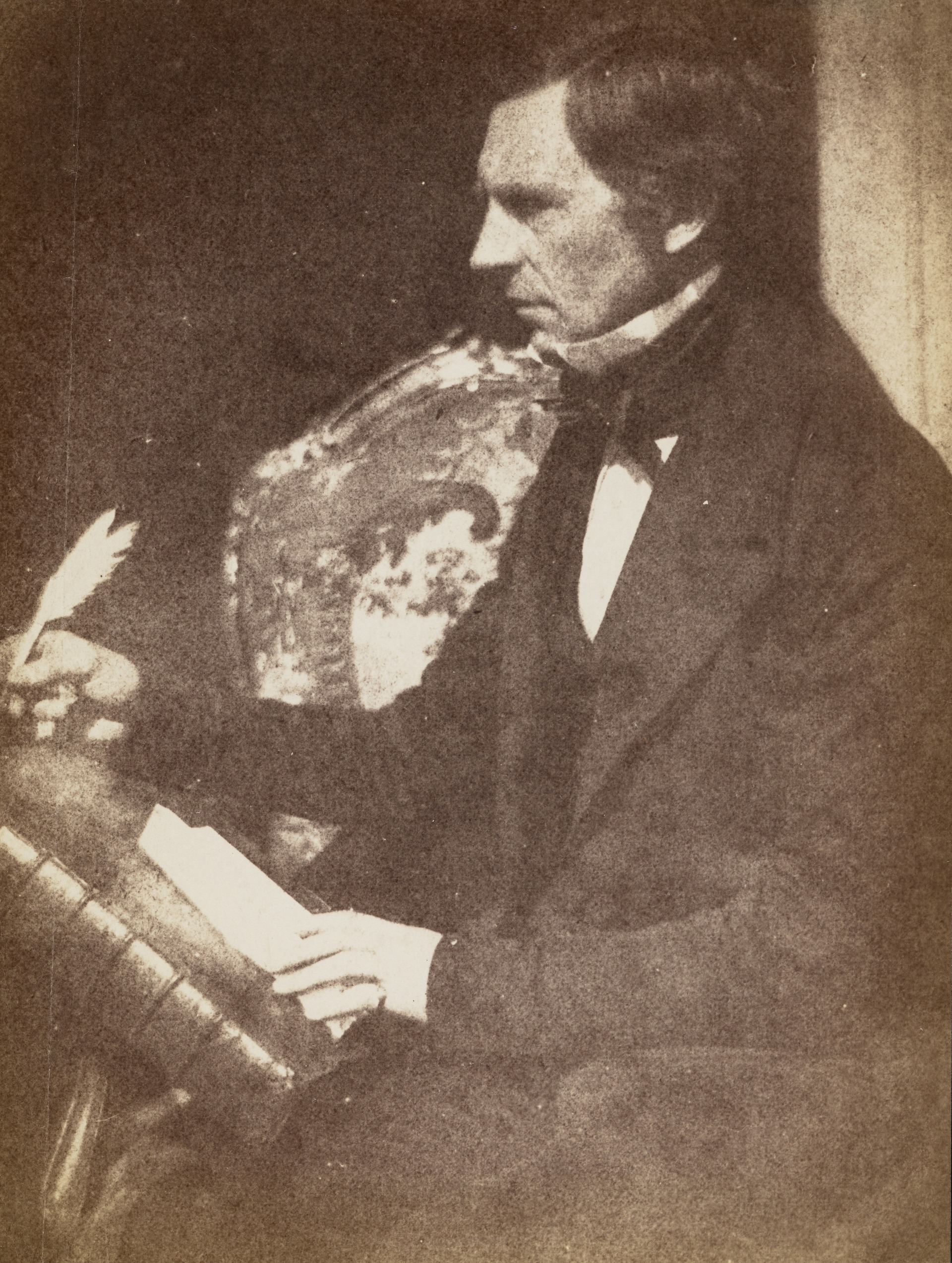
William Maxwell Hetherington by Hill & Adamson

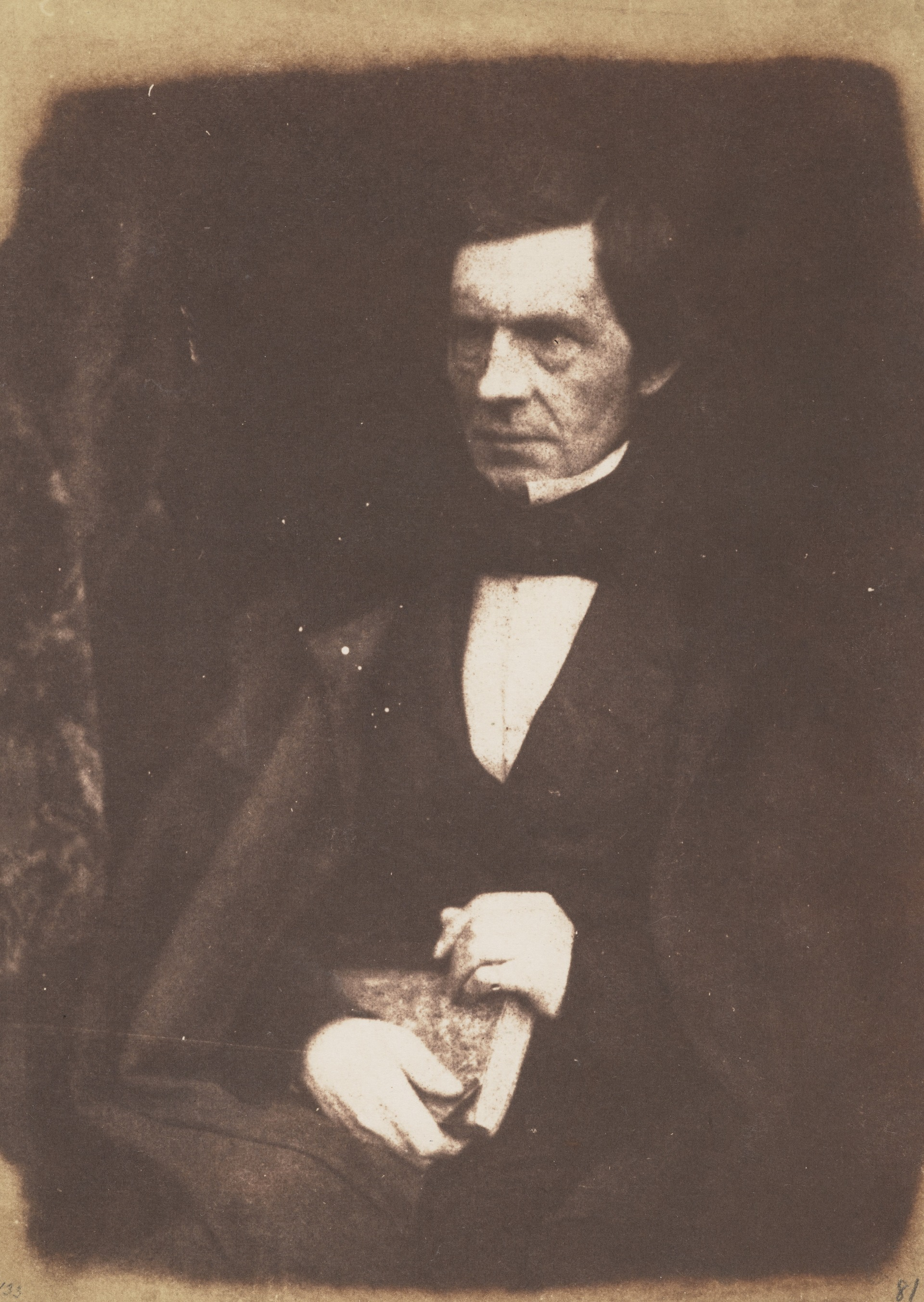
William Maxwell Hetherington a book

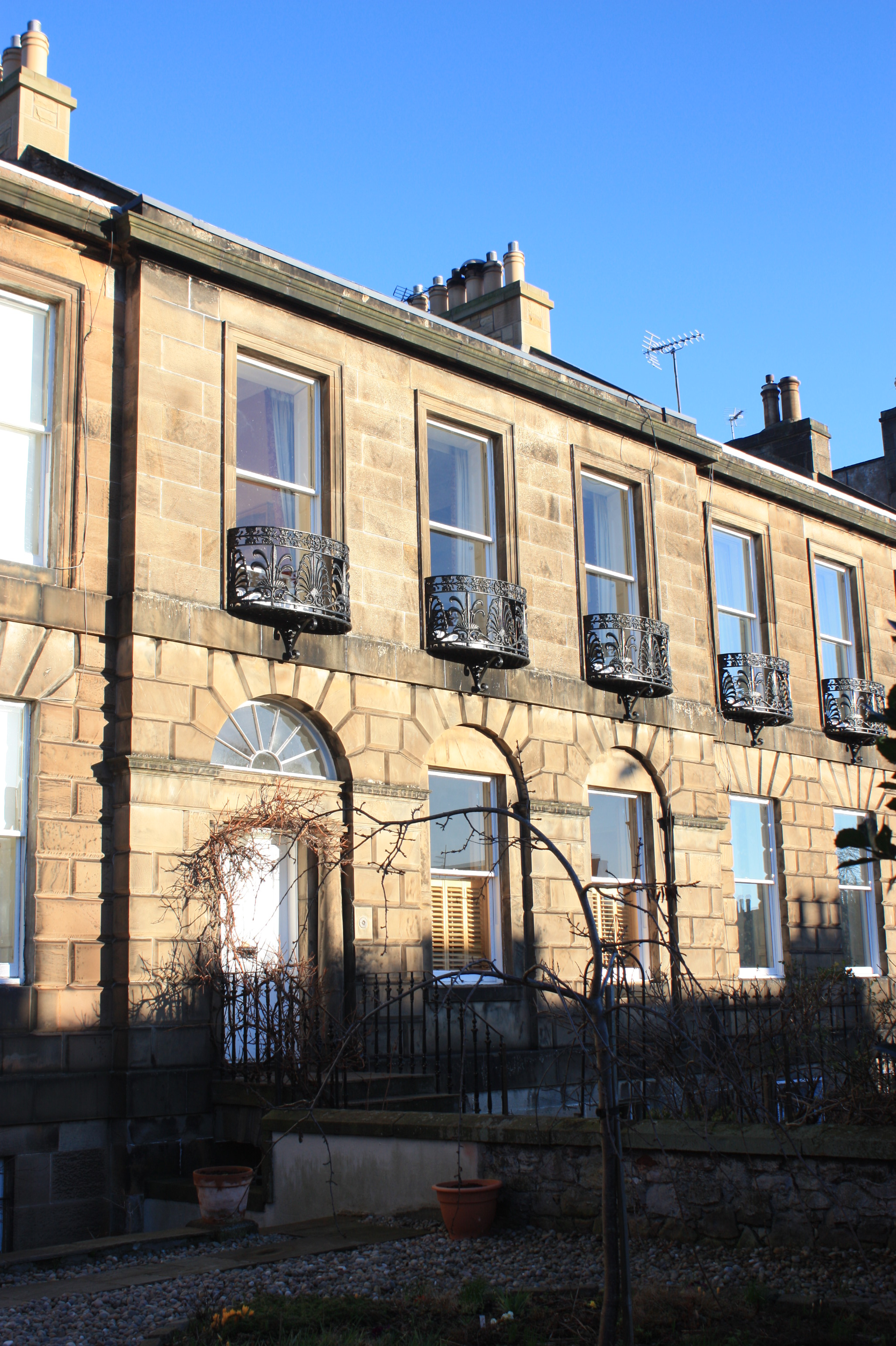
Hetherington's house at 27 Minto Street, Edinburgh

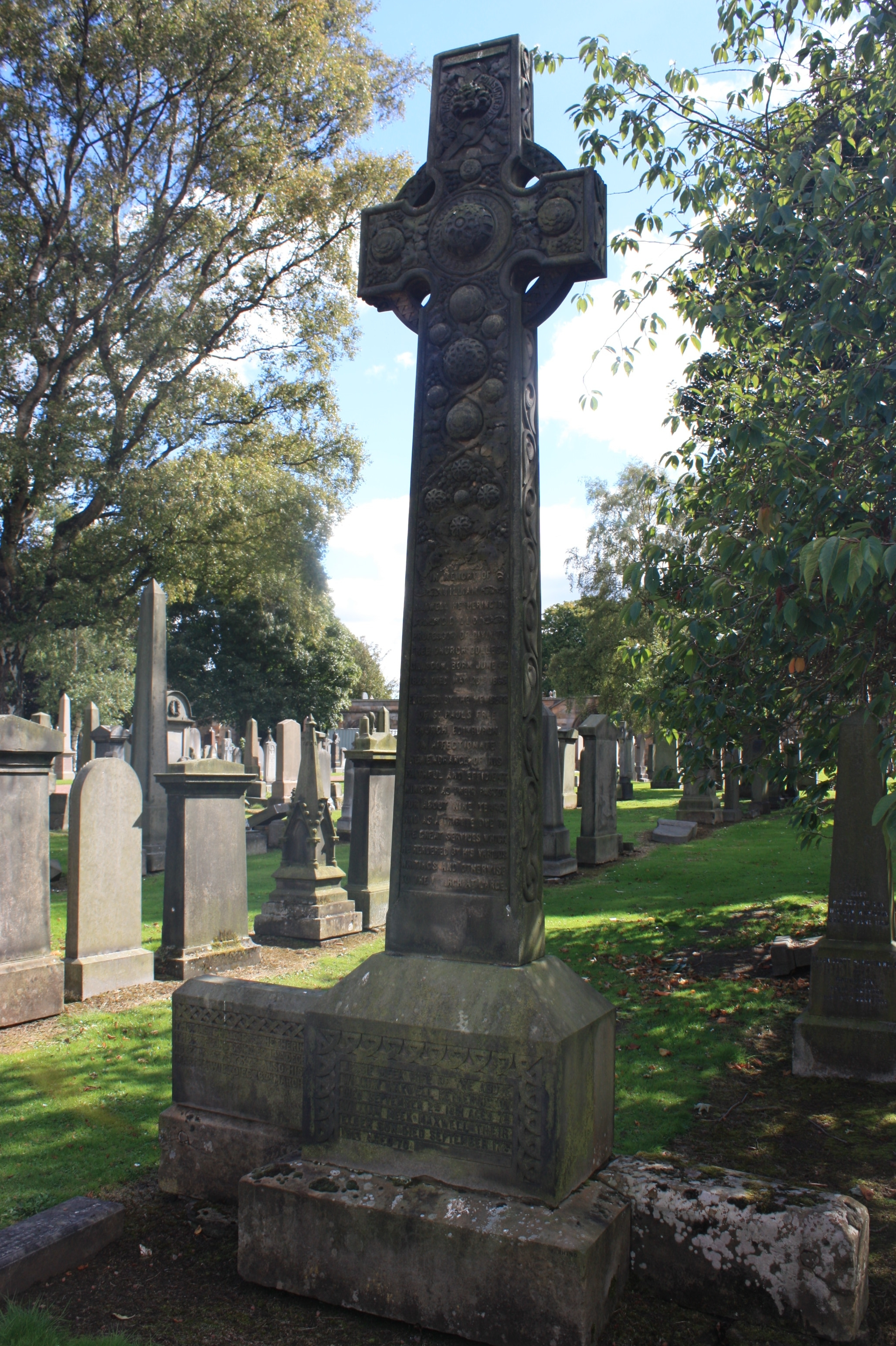
William Maxwell Hetherington's grave, Grange Cemetery

William Maxwell Hetherington (4 June 1803 – 23 May 1865) was a Scottish minister, poet and church historian. He entered the University of Edinburgh but before completing his studies for the church, he published in 1829, 'Twelve Dramatic Sketches' founded on the Pastoral Poetry of Scotland. Hetherington became minister of Torphichen, Linlithgow, in 1836; in 1843 he adhered to the Free Church, and in 1844 was appointed to a charge in St. Andrews. He subsequently became minister of Free St. Paul's, Edinburgh, in 1848; and was appointed professor of apologetics and systematic theology in New College, Glasgow, in 1857. He died 23 May 1865.

== Early life and education ==
William Hetherington was born on 4 June 1803, in the parish of Troqueer, which, though adjoining the town of Dumfries, is situated in the Stewartry of Kirkcudbright. His father was a gardener, and for the long period of forty years in the employment of Mr. Maxwell of Carruchan. After a basic parish school education, he left without introduction to the study of the Classical Languages. In 1822, after a few months' private study of Latin and Greek, he matriculated in the University of Edinburgh, at the age of nineteen, and in spite of disadvantages in preliminary training, achieved marked success as a student all along the lines of study; taking the highest place in Greek, and the second in the class of Moral Philosophy. His relations to Professor Wilson developed rapidly into intimate friendship; and it was under his encouragement, that he ventured to publish in 1829, before completing his Theological Curriculum, a small volume of poems, under the title of "Dramatic Sketches."

== Early working life ==
On the completion of his course of study, Mr. Hetherington received an appointment as tutor, first in the family of a Scottish nobleman, and then to the son of an Irish peer resident in London. During this period of comparative leisure which extended over several years, he devoted himself to the study of general history; and in the course of his research became impressed with the idea that there was room for a popular exposition of the course of providential discipline by which the world was prepared for the advent of the Son of God. In prosecution of this idea, he published in 1834 an elaborate treatise, titled "The Fulness of Time," in which he traced the progress of the mental and moral development of the race during the Patriarchal Age, and under the dynasties of Egypt, Babylon, Persia, Greece, and Rome. This was the work that received the favourable notice of the eminent poet-laureate of the day. Dr. Southey, in his well-known work, "The Doctor," and that indicated, at this early period, the tendency of the author's mind towards historical research, and the generalisations of Christian philosophy.

== Church of Scotland ministry ==
In 1836, Mr. Hetherington accepted a presentation to the parish of Torphichen, in the Presbytery of Linlithgow.

Shortly after his ordination he married a daughter of the Rev. Dr. Meek, of Hamilton, formerly of Torphichen, who returned as his wife, to the manse in which she had been born, and where she had spent the years of girlhood.

During these opening years of his ministry, Rev. Hetherington gained the confidence of the more public leaders of the Evangelical party; he was looked to as a representative in his district of the country; and was in frequent and intimate communication with them. Perhaps the most effective of his platform appearances on the Church question was made at this time, in Linlithgow, when, in response to a sudden call to take the place of a deputation from Edinburgh who had failed to appear, he delivered an extemporaneous address of three hours, expounding what he saw as the principles at stake.

== Literary productions from Torphichen ==
His ministry at Torphichen was a period of great literary activity; his "Minister's Family," the article "Rome" for the "Encyclopaedia Britannica," and numerous contributions to the Presbyterian Review, and other magazines, being amongst his lighter efforts.

Amid many references and documents regarding the history of the Church, there lacked of a manual of the history of the Scottish Church. Thus Mr. Hetherington produced, within a year of his beginning to compose it, an 800 page volume in 1841. Written with such rapidity, the "History of the Church of Scotland" was in some respects more like the pleading of an advocate than the deliberate and unbiassed conclusions of a judge; but such was its popularity, that six or seven editions were printed, including an inexpensive edition for the people, and a library edition in two volumes.

== At the Disruption ==
The bicentenary of the Westminster Divines fell on the year of the Disruption. The Westminster Assembly's products such as the Confession of Faith were relatively well known in 1843 but comparatively few were familiar with the history of the Assembly. Mr. Hetherington, on the very month of the Disruption, brought out a volume entitled, "History of the Westminster Assembly of Divines."

In 1840, Mr. Hetherington was one of the General Assembly's deputies to the refractory Presbytery of Strathbogie, and in the discharge of his work received the usual attention of a Civil Interdict, which he defied on the strength of his higher commission as a servant of Christ and of His Church.

Mr. Hetherington was present at all the diets of the Convocation in 1842, in which the Church's line of action was determined. On the 28 of May, Mr. Hetherington preached for the last time in the Parish Church of Torphichen. Anticipating controversy that the site for the new church at Torphichen was secured, and some materials collected, before he set out for the meeting of the Assembly in 1843, the removal of earth for the foundations was begun on the 12 June, and on the 6 August, within eight weeks of its commencement, the church was opened for public worship. On the 24 of the same month Mr. Hetherington entered the new manse; and, on 2 October, a new building was opened as a school-house. Thus it was given to the congregation of Torphichen to complete successively the first church, manse, and school-house in connection with the Free Church of Scotland.

In addition to the enormous labour of organising the Free Church, the leaders of the Disruption wanted to expound its principles far and wide, at the earnest solicitation of friends interested in its history. Mr. Hetherington was sent in November 1843, along with Robert Smith Candlish, Andrew Gray of Perth, D. M. Makgill Crichton, and others, to visit certain of the leading towns in Yorkshire.

== Free Church ministry in St Andrews ==
His services in the literary field presently recommended him to the notice of the Free Church congregation of St. Andrews, where it was felt to be eminently desirable that a minister should be settled, not only suited to a university town, but capable also of taking some charge of any Free Church students there who might be pursuing their studies with a view to the ministry. At St. Andrews, Mr. Hetherington added to his other duties that of editor of the Free Church Magazine, which he continued to superintend for four years, and in which he wrote many reviews and articles, not only during the time of his own editorship, but also in subsequent years. Immediately on his settlement in St Andrews, Mr. Hetherington received the degree of LL.D. from the College of New Brunswick, U.S.; and, eleven years later, in 1855, the degree of D.D. (doctor of divinity) was conferred on him by the Jefferson College, Pennsylvania.

== Free Church ministry in Edinburgh ==
On the removal of the Rev. Robert Elder to Rothesay, Dr. Hetherington was called to the charge of Free St. Paul's, in Edinburgh. One of the works of this time was the oversight of two large schools erected through his exertions. In Edinburgh he lived at 27 Minto Street. Among the labours of love in which he engaged during his Edinburgh ministry must be reckoned a course of lectures to young men on the Popish controversy, which he delivered in connection with the Protestant Institute—then commencing its operations in the city. At this period he was a frequent lecturer on subjects of general interest—social, literary, and historical; in 1853, delivered in Exeter Hall, London, England, a lecture on "Coleridge and his followers; and during his Edinburgh, Scotland, ministry wrote "Memoir of Mrs. Coutts."

== Work at the Free Church College in Glasgow ==
After a ministry of nine years in Edinburgh, he received a unanimous appointment by the General Assembly of 1857 to the chair of Apologetics and Systematic Theology in the Free Church College, Glasgow. A posthumous volume entitled "The Apologetics of the Christian Faith," which contains the lectures prepared for his students during his first session, and almost in the form in which they were originally delivered, reflects this work.

At his time of life, the effort proved too much. It is probable that his constitution was then so far weakened as not to be able to rally from an accident which he received soon after, or to throw off the effects of a stroke of paralysis, which, about the year 1862, disabled him for any active exertion. Nevertheless he continued to write until death. The Assembly having resolved to appoint a colleague and successor to him, a contest ensued which resulted in the appointment of Dr. Islay Burns. He then lived at 13 Oakfield Terrace in Glasgow.

== Death and legacy ==
He died on the 23d May 1865. Dr. Hetherington was of a frank, manly, outspoken nature, more concerned to speak as he felt, than to avoid all the consequences of his outspokenness. He was particularly fond of students, and his pleasant method of pouring out to them the stores of information which lay in his mind made them as fond of him as he was of them. As a speaker, and as a preacher, he was clear, forcible, and emphatic, although not attaining the first rank in either capacity. He died at home in Glasgow and is buried with his wife Jessie Meek, who had died in Edinburgh in 1851. The grave lies on the north edge of the north-west section of Grange Cemetery in Edinburgh, under a huge granite Celtic cross by the sculptor John Rhind.

== Family ==
He married 1 June 1836, Jessie (died 2 September 1871), daughter of William Meek, D.D., Hamilton, and had issue —

- William Meek Maxwell, born 11 July 1843
- Thomas Chalmers, born 15 September 1847.

== Works ==
- Twelve Dramatic Sketches founded on the Pastoral Poetry of Scotland (Edinburgh, 1829)
- The Fulness of Time (London, 1834)
- The Minister's Family (Edinburgh, 1838)
- Thoughts on the Connection between Church and State (Edinburgh, 1840)
- History of the Church of Scotland (Edinburgh, 1841, and various editions)
- The History of the Westminster Assembly (1843)
- The History of Rome (1849)
- The Harmony existing between Christianity and True Science
- The Anti-Christian System
- National Education in Scotland
- Poems on Various Subjects (Edinburgh, 1851)
- Toleration, or the Principles of Religious Liberty (Edinburgh, 1854)
- Account of the Parish (New Statistical Account, ii.),
- Lecture V. (on the Social Condition of the People), and XL (to Young Men, ii.)
- Authoritative Exposition of the Principles of the Free Church
- edited Practical Works of the Rev. John Willison
- edited Works of George Gillespie
- founder and editor of Free Church Magazine.

Before completing his studies for the church he published, in 1829, Twelve Dramatic Sketches' founded on the Pastoral Poetry of Scotland, with delineations of scenery and manners.

Besides his poems Hetherington published:

- The Fulness of Time 1834
- The Ministers Family, 1838, a popular evangelical work.
- History of the Church of Scotlandoriginally 1841 but drastically revised following the Disruption of 1843. The book was preceded by an essay On the Principles and Constitution of the Church of Scotland, and reached a seventh edition in 1852.
- History of the Westminster Assembly of Divines, 1843. It was edited and annotated in 1878 by Rev. Robert Williamson.

In 1844 Hetherington established the Free Church Magazine, which he edited for four years. He also contributed to religious periodicals, especially the British and Foreign Evangelical Review, and published sermons, poems, and some shorter religious works.

== Other sources ==
Attribution:

- This article incorporates text from a publication now in the public domain: Bayne, Thomas Wilson (1891), "Hetherington, William Maxwell", in Stephen, Leslie; Lee, Sidney (eds.), Dictionary of National Biography, vol. 26, London: Smith, Elder & Co, pp. 300–301 Endnotes:
  - Glasgow and Edinburgh newspapers, May 1865
