= Forbes Falconer =

Scottish Persian scholar

Forbes Falconer (10 September 1805, Aberdeen – 1853), was a Scottish Persian scholar.

== Life ==
Falconer was born at Aberdeen, 10 September 1805, was the second and only surviving son of Gilbert Falconer of Braeside, Fife. He was educated at the grammar school and at Marischal College, where he obtained prizes in classical studies. His first publications, which appeared anonymously in local journals, were also classical, consisting of metrical translations from the Greek anthology. He commenced his oriental studies before the age of twenty, by attending the Hebrew classes of Professor James Bentley in Aberdeen, and likewise began the private study of Arabic and Persian. Afterwards proceeding to Paris he attended, during nearly five years, the courses of de Sacy, de Chézy, and, for Hindustani, of Garcin de Tassy. After short visits to several German universities, Falconer returned to this country, and settled in London as a teacher of oriental languages, holding for a short time the professorship of oriental languages in University College London.

== Works ==
Falconer is perhaps best known in the present day for his works on the Bostan, from which he published in 1839 a volume of selections, very neatly lithographed from his own transcript. In the Asiatic Journal, a useful periodical now defunct, he published a translation of part of the same poem, as well as selections from several of the Sufi poets, and a critical study of the Sindbad-Nameh. Falconer edited two important poems of Jāmi, the Tuhfat-ul-Ahrār and Salāmān u Absāl, for the Society for the Publication of Oriental Texts. The critical ability of these texts is attested by Francis Johnson in the preface to his edition of John Richardson's Persian Dictionary. Falconer's Persian Grammar reached a second edition in 1848.
