= Stephen Weston (antiquary) =

English antiquarian, clergyman and man of letters

- Born: 1747; Exeter, England
- Died: 8 January 1830 (aged 82–83); Portman Square, London
- Occupations: Antiquarian, clergyman

Stephen Weston FRS FSA (1747 – 8 January 1830) was an English antiquarian, clergyman and man of letters.

== Early life ==
Born in Exeter, Weston was the eldest son of Stephen Weston (died 19 January 1750), registrar of the diocese of Exeter, and his wife Elizabeth Oxenham of South Tawton, Devon; Stephen Weston (1665–1742) the bishop of Exeter was his grandfather. He was educated at Blundell's School, Eton College and Exeter College, where he matriculated on 7 June 1764, and resided from 4 July 1764 to 7 July 1768. He graduated B.A. in 1768, M.A. in 1770, B.D. in 1782, and was a Devonshire fellow of his college from 1768 to 1784.

== Clergy years ==
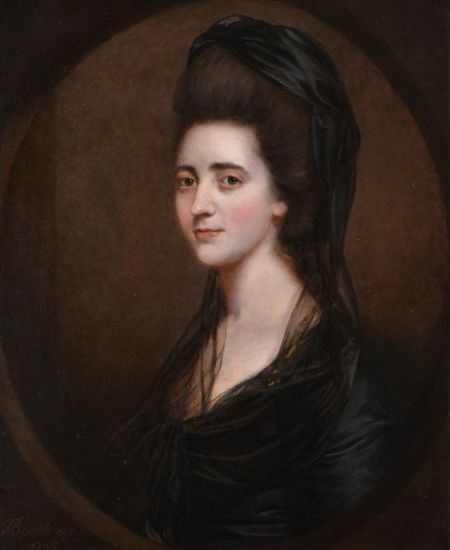
Penelope Tierney, later Mrs. Stephen Weston (1758-1789)

About 1771 Weston accompanied Sir Charles Warwick Bampfylde as tutor in a long tour on the continent of Europe. Wilmot Vaughan, 1st Earl of Lisburne, an early friend, nominated Weston on 29 March 1777 to the rectory of Mamhead, Devon. During his incumbency there he rebuilt the parsonage house. He was instituted on 17 January 1784 to the rectory of Little Hempston, near Totnes. There he moved into the north chancel window of the church some stained glass which had been in Marldon church. He vacated his fellowship in 1784, on marrying. Late in 1790 he resigned the living of Mamhead, but retained the benefice of Little Hempston until 1823.

== Art and literature focus ==
After the death of his wife, Weston concentrated on art and literature. He witnessed the Paris events of the French Revolution in 1791 and 1792, leaving in mid-August 1792 when he felt unsafe. He was elected Fellow of the Royal Society on 1 March 1792 and of the Society of Antiquaries of London on 18 December 1794, and lived for some years among the dilettanti in London. After the Treaty of Amiens in 1802 he visited Paris again, and then once more during the summer of 1829.

Weston was dubbed by Thomas James Mathias and George Steevens "Classic Weston", and he was flattered to have a circle of female admirers. At the age of 82 he died in Edward Street, Portman Square, London, on 8 January 1830. Auction catalogues of the "remaining portion of his library" and of his "Greek and Roman coins and medals" were issued that year. He left an annuity for the poor of the parishes of Little Hempston, Mamhead, and Marylebone.

== Works ==
Weston in 1802 made an English translation of the Greek text of the trilingual Rosetta Stone. The Society of Antiquaries published it in 1811.

Weston also published travel notes, classical texts and annotations, notes on Shakespeare, scriptural discussions and translations from Arabic, Chinese and Persian. His works included:

- Viaggiana: Remarks on the Buildings, &c., of Rome (anon.), 1776; another edition 1790.
- Hermesianax, sive Conjecturæ in Athenæum, 1784
- Attempt to translate and explain the Difficult Passages in the Song of Deborah, 1788.
- Turtle Dove: a Tale from the French of M. de Florian (anon.), Caen, 1789, in verse
- Winter Assembly, or Provincial Ball, 1789.
- Letters from Paris during the Summer of 1791 (anon.), 1792; 2nd vol., as Letters from Paris during the Summer of 1792 (anon.), 1793.
- Elegia Grayiana græce: Interprete Stephano Weston, 1794.
- Conjectures, with Short Comments and Illustrations of Various Passages in the New Testament, 1795; these were incorporated in the fourth edition of William Bowyer the younger's Critical Conjectures on the New Testament (1812).
- Horatius Flaccus, cum locis quibusdam e Græcis scriptoribus collatis, 1801; another edition 1805.
- Conformity of European with Oriental Languages, 1802; enlarged, 1803.
- Spirited Remonstrance from Rajah Soubah Sing to Emperor Aurungzebe, Persian and English, 1803.
- The Praise of Paris: a Sketch of the French Capital in 1802, 1803
- Dares et Entellus, or Bourke and the Chicken, Carmine Latino, 1804.
- Werneria, or Short Characters of Earths. By Terræ Filius i.e. Weston, 1805; pt. ii. by Terræ-Filius Philagricola, 1806.
- Moral Aphorisms in Arabic and a Persian Commentary in Verse, 1805.
- Fragment of a Tragedy lately acted at the British Museum, or the Tears of Cracherode, at the theft of prints, (anon.), 1806.
- Fragments of Oriental Literature, with an Outline of a Painting on a Curious China Vase, 1807.
- A Short Account of the Late Mr. Porson. By an Admirer of a Great Genius, 1808; reissued in 1814 with Porsoniana; or Scraps from Porson's Rich Feast.
- Short Notes on Shakspeare by way of Supplement to Johnson, Steevens, Malone, and Douce, 1808.
- Ly Tang: an Imperial Poem in Chinese by Kien Lung. With Translation and Notes, 1809.
- A Specimen of Picturesque Poetry in Chinese. Inscribed on a Cup by S. W., 1810?
- Remains of Arabic in Spanish and Portuguese Languages, 1810.
- Conquest of the Miao-tsé. By Kien Lung, 1810
- Specimen of a Dictionary in English and Chinese, 1811.
- Siao-cu-lin; or a Small Collection of Chinese Characters, 1812.
- Persian Recreations; or Oriental Stories by Philoxenus Secundus, 1812; reissued as Persian Recreations: or New Tales, 1812.
- Persian Distichs from Various Authors, 1814.
- Fan-hy-cheu: a Tale in Chinese and English. With Notes and a Short Grammar of the Chinese Language, 1814.
- Greek, Latin, and Sanscrit compared, 1814.
- A Slight Sketch of Paris in its Improved State since 1802. By a Visitor, 1814.
- Ode to Catherine the Great, 21 January 1785, translated 1815.
- Episodes from the Shah Nameh, by Ferdoosee. Translated into English Verse, 1815.
- Chinese Poem inscribed on Porcelain [A.D. 1776]. With a Double Translation and Notes, 1816.
- Two Sketches of France, Belgium, and Spa, 1771 and 1816, 1817.
- La Scava: an Excavation of a Roman Villa on the Hill of Chatelet, 1772. With a journey to the Simplon and Mont Blanc (anon.), 1818.
- Nyg, 1818.
- Enchiridion Romæ: the Buildings, Pictures, &c., of Rome, 1819.
- Extracts from a Journal, June to September 1819, on France, Belgium, and Germany, anon., 1820.
- Chinese Chronicle by Abdalla of Beyza. Translated from the Persian, 1820. 40. Tareek Kataice: Chinese Chronology, 1820.
- Voyages of Hiram and Solomon, 1821.
- A Trimester in France and Switzerland, July to October 1820. By an Oxonian, 1821.
- Visit to Vaucluse in May 1821. By the Author of the "Trimester", 1822.
- Petrarchiana; Additions to the "Visit to Vaucluse", 1822.
- Catechism of 1589; reprinted 1823.
- Annotations on the Psalms, 1824,
- The Englishman Abroad: pt. i. Greece, Latium, Persia, and China; pt. ii. Russia, Germany, Italy, France, Spain, and Portugal, 1824, pieces in prose and verse, with translations.
- Historic Notices of Towns in Greece and other Countries that have struck Coins, 1826; 2nd edit. 1827.
- Short Recollections in a Journey to Pæstum, 1828.

Weston contributed to Archæologia on coins and medals between 1798 and 1818, and supplied notes, signed "S. W.", to Johnson and Steevens' Shakspeare (1793), and to the new edition (1802) by Samuel Rousseau of John Richardson's Specimen of Persian Poetry: or Odes of Hafiz. He was a contributor to the Gentleman's Magazine, to John Nichols' Literary Anecdotes, and to the Classical Journal. He supplied poems, signed "W. N.", to the two volumes of Poems, chiefly by Gentlemen of Devon and Cornwall, 1792.

== Family ==
In 1784 Weston married Penelope, youngest daughter of James Tierney, a commissioner of accounts, of Cleeve Hill in Mangotsfield parish, Gloucestershire. She died at Caen in Normandy late in 1789 or early in 1790, of consumption, at age 31.

== Biographical references and publications ==
- The Rosetta Stone, Harrison and Sons, London, 1903
- Letters from Paris 1791, Stephen Weston, printed for J Debrett and J Clarke, 1792
- Remains of Arabic in Spanish and Portuguese Languages, Stephen Weston, printed by S Rousseau, London, 1810
- Allibone, Dictionary of English Literature, 1859–71. • BBA: I 1152, 367–376.
