= St Paul's Parish Church, Edinburgh =

St Paul's Parish Church
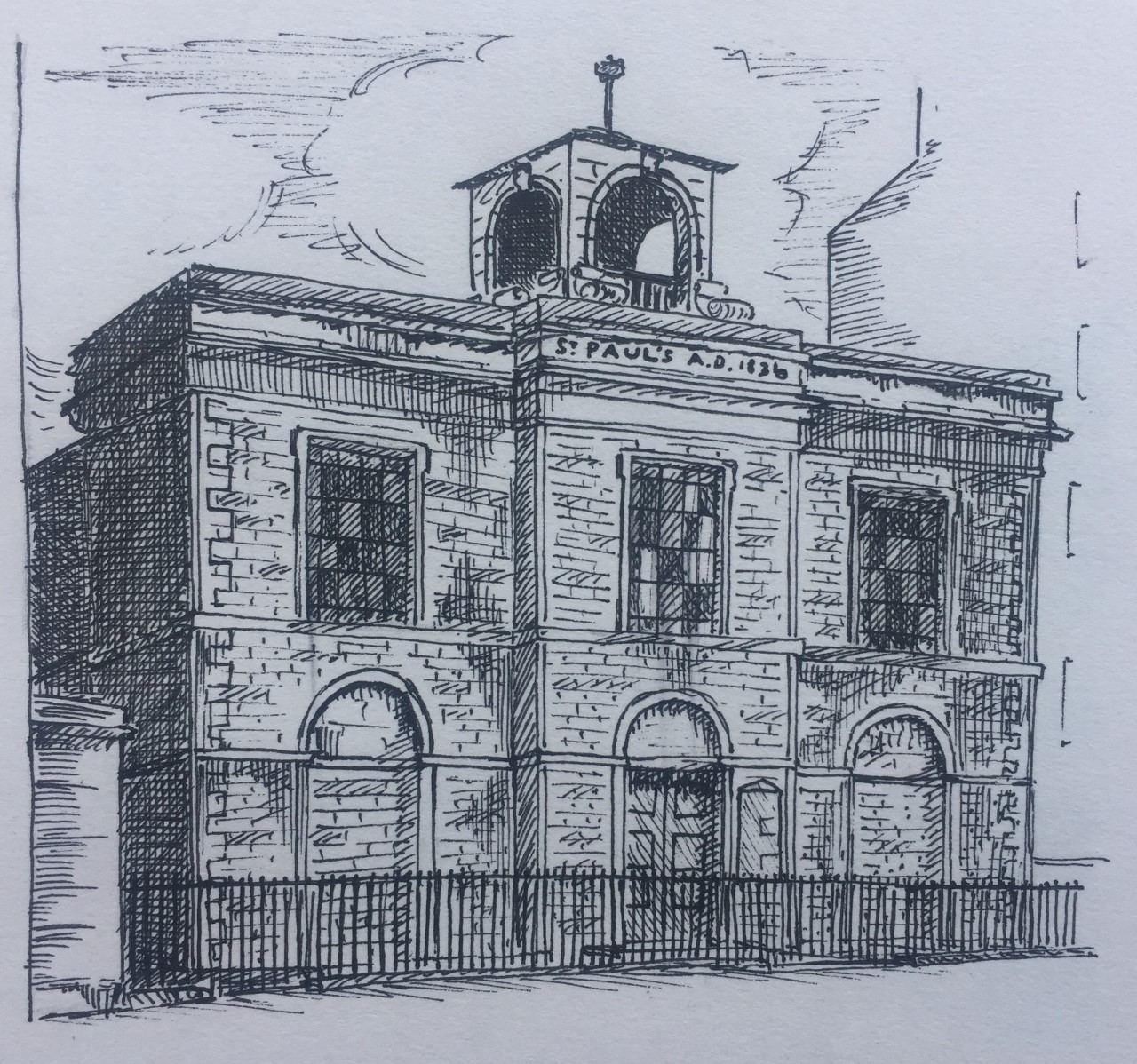
- St Paul's Parish Church
- 55°56′35.2″N 3°10′45.4″W
- Location: St Leonard's Street, Edinburgh
- Country: Scotland
- Denomination: Church of Scotland
- Previous denomination: United Free Church of Scotland (1900–1929); Free Church of Scotland (1843–1900)

History
- Former name(s): St Paul's United Free Church (1900–1929); St Paul's Free Church (1843–1900)
- Dedication: Paul of Tarsus

Architecture
- Functional status: Demolished
- Style: Neoclassical
- Completed: 1836
- Closed: 1942
- Demolished: 1980

St Paul's Parish Church was a parish church of the Church of Scotland located in St Leonard's, Edinburgh, Scotland. Its building served as a church between 1836 and 1942 before being demolished in 1980.

St Paul's was founded in 1836 as part of the Church of Scotland's Church Extension Scheme to serve the expanding industrial neighbourhood of St Leonard's. At the Disruption of 1843, the congregation left the established church for the Free Church. The congregation was allowed to keep the building, which became St Paul's Free Church. With most of the Free Church, the congregation joined the United Free Church in 1900 and rejoined the Church of Scotland in 1929. The congregation united with Newington East Parish Church in 1942 to form St Paul's Newington Parish Church. The St Paul's buildings were subsequently used as a theatre and as a school annexe before their demolition in 1980.

== History ==
=== Foundation and Disruption ===
St Paul's Church was built as part of the Church of Scotland's Church Extension Scheme and opened for worship on 4 December 1836. The church's first trustees included distinguished figures such as John Abercrombie; Rev John Paul; and Rev John Bruce. Robert Elder was inducted as the first minister with Robert Smith Candlish preaching at the installation. The General Assembly had created St Paul's a parish quoad sacra on 30 May 1836 and the Court of Teinds recognised this status on 28 May 1838. Under Elder, the congregation grew and numbered between 450 and 500 members when, at the Disruption of 1843, Elder led almost all the congregation out of the established church and into the newly formed Free Church.

Construction had been largely funded by a donation of over £2,000 from Agnes Hunter of Glencorse. Hunter's donation meant the church belonged to the congregation rather than the Church of Scotland and also meant that it was largely free of construction debt. At the Disruption, the congregation was, therefore able to claim the buildings for the new Free Church. The Court of Session allowed the congregation to remain on the condition it refunded the Church of Scotland a £300 grant.

=== Later years ===
Elder was called to minister at Rothesay in 1847 and was succeeded by William Maxwell Hetherington, whose Sunday night lectures on Old Testament history often drew large crowds to the church. In 1851, during Hetherington's incumbency, congregational halls became the site of the school attached to the church. At the departure of Hetherington's successor, George Brown, in 1876, the school had a roll of 500 pupils. After the Edinburgh School Board took over management of the school in the 1870s, the halls were occupied solely for congregational use. In 1898, the church's first organ was installed. In 1900, the congregation, along with most of the Free Church, joined the United Free Church in 1900 before rejoining the Church of Scotland in 1929.

=== Post-ecclesiastical use ===
After the death in 1942 of St Paul's last minister, John Bain, the congregation began negotiations to unite with the nearby congregation of Newington East. After the congregations united to form St Paul's Newington on 4 October 1942, the St Paul's buildings were leased to Edinburgh Corporation for use as an annexe to the nearby James Clark Technical School; although the congregation retained use of the halls. In 1948, the council converted the church into the Cygnet Theatre. The theatre had ceased to function by 1954, when the church was again being used by James Clark Technical School and by Preston Street School. In 1958, the building was sold to a private buyer before being demolished in 1980 to make way for St Leonard's Police Station.

== Ministers ==
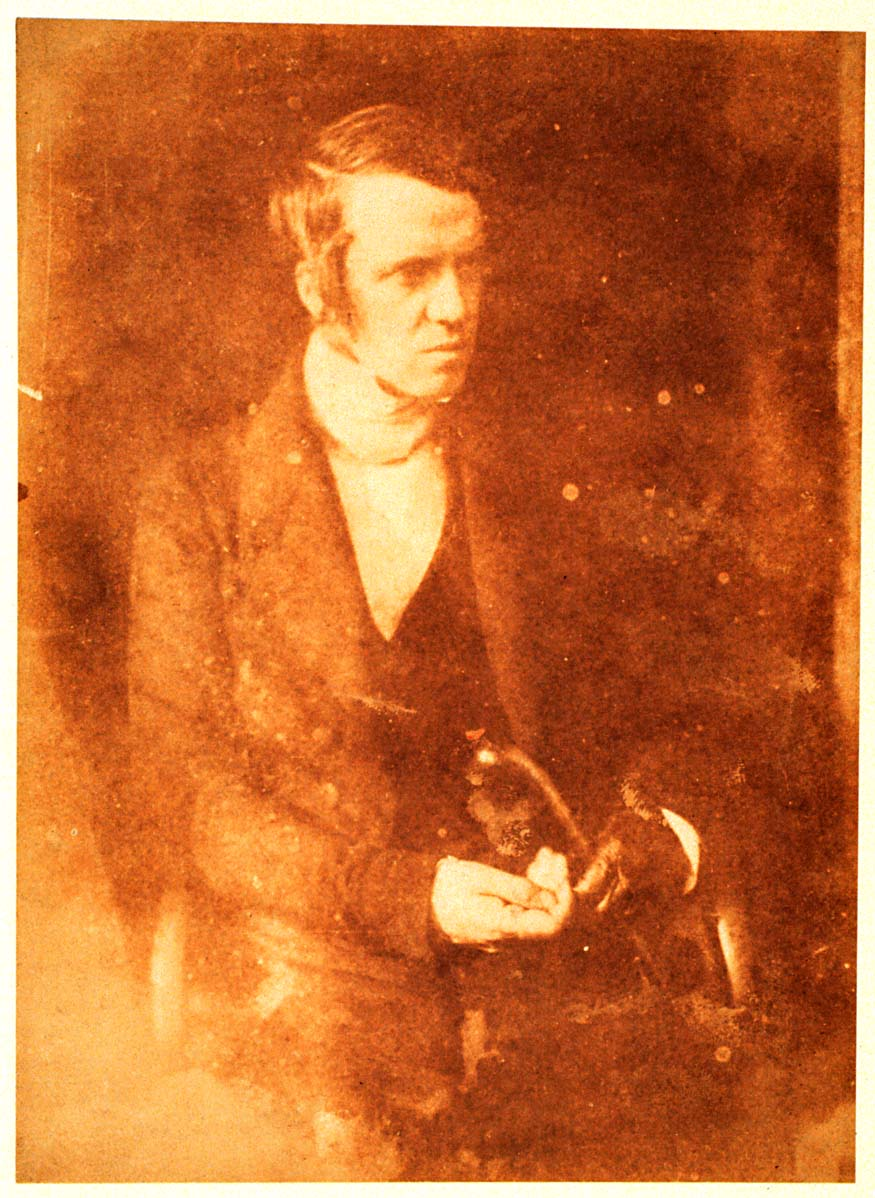
Robert Elder: first minister of St Paul's Church

The following ministers served St Paul's Parish Church (1836–1843 and 1929–1942); St Paul's Free Church (1843–1900); and St Paul's United Free Church (1900–1929):

- 1838–1847 Robert Elder
- 1848–1857 William Maxwell Hetherington
- 1857–1873 George Brown
- 1874–1876 Andrew Ryrie
- 1876–1913 William Meek Falconer
- 1913–1925 Herbert Francis Falconer
- 1926–1942 John Bain

== Building and plate ==
The church was a squat neoclassical building with an Italianate bell tower. The architect was George Smith.

At the union of the congregations, St Paul's communion plate was donated to St Andrew's Church, Malta, which had lost its plate in the bombing of the island.
