= Samuel Rousseau (orientalist) =

- Born: 1763
- Died: 4 December 1820 (aged 57); Ray Street, Clerkenwell, London
- Known for: Arabic – English dictionary; translations of Persian literature
- Spouse: Mary Silvester (m. 1787)
- Children: 2 daughters, Maria and Caroline

Samuel Rousseau (1763–1820) was a British Oriental scholar and printer. He compiled very early Arabic-English and Persian-English dictionaries, and translated and printed the first English-language editions of several important Arabic and Persian works.

== Family background ==
Samuel Rosseau was the eldest son of Phillip Rousseau, a printer working for William Bowyer, and his wife Susannah (Note: The suggestion that Samuel Rousseau was related to the French philosopher Jean-Jacques Rousseau was raised during the former's lifetime, in the anonymous Literary Memoirs of Living Authors of Great Britain. This claim was promptly rebutted by Samuel's former master, and his brother's employer, John Nichols, in the pages of the Gentleman's Magazine, but nevertheless later found its way into the Dictionary of National Biography. This was subsequently identified as an error, in the Annales de la Société Jean-Jacques Rousseau. Ritter, in the Annales, shows that the 'good parent and honest man' referred to in Jean-Jacques Rousseau's letter to David Hume was Jean Rousseau, a confirmed second cousin of the philosopher, rather than Samuel Rousseau. Both Ritter and Van Staen conjecture a possible connection to Jean-Jacques Rousseau's great-uncle Jacob Rousseau, who lived in London in the late 17th century, but report the suggestion as unproven at best.).

Phillip died in 1814 and was buried at St Bride's Church, Fleet Street. He was the beneficiary of a fund established by Bowyer's will, and was described by John Nichols as 'the father and grandfather of several worthy printers'. Samuel Rousseau's brother James was also a printer, and in his later years oversaw the printing of the Votes and Proceedings of the House of Commons.

== Early life ==
Samuel was baptised as Samuel Kent Rousseau in St Andrew-by-the-Wardrobe, under the auspices of St Ann Blackfriars, on 20 November 1763. St Ann's had been destroyed by the Great Fire of London, and the parish united with St Andrew's, but the congregation retained a distinct identity, and separate parish registers were kept.

Bowyers, which was later taken over by John Nichols, took on Samuel as an apprentice in 1778, where he was later joined by his younger brother, James James spent the rest of his working life as a compositor and editor for Nichols, but Samuel preferred to strike out on his own. Despite this, he was occasionally employed by Nichols in collecting epitaphs, and other historical records for The Gentleman's Magazine.

According to Timperley, Samuel Rousseau was "a singular instance of patient perseverance in the acquirements of the ancient languages". Whilst working as an apprentice and journeyman, he taught himself Latin, Greek, Hebrew, Persian, Arabic, and the Syriac language. To these he added French and several other modern languages.

On 27 May 1787, he married Mary Silvester at Tottenham. He subsequently had two daughters, Maria and Caroline.

== Translator, printer and publisher ==
After his apprenticeship, he was for a brief time Master of Joye's Charity School (see List of former schools in the City of London) in St Ann's, Blackfriars But in 1798, it was announced in the Gentleman's Magazine that he was to leave this line of work and start his own printing business.

He set up his own printing business in Leather Lane, Holborn, and later moved to Wood Street, Spa Fields, Clerkenwell, where he established the Arabic Press, sometimes also called the Arabic and Persian Press. Here, he contributed to a number of scholarly works on Middle-Eastern languages, including the expanded edition of John Richardson's Arabic and Persian Dictionary. He commissioned the making of Persian type by Vincent Figgins and set about translating and printing several classic works of Middle-Eastern literature. He compiled a wide range of these in The Flowers of Persian Literature , which he dedicated to Mirza Abu Taleb Khan. This was the first work to be printed in nastaliq script in England, and was intended as a companion to Sir William Jones' Grammar of the Persian Language. The work includes a long essay on Persian language and literature, and demonstrates the dramatic growth in Persian study and translation in the last quarter of the eighteenth century.

Rousseau's press also published an expanded version of Richardson's Odes of Hafiz with additional material by Rousseau himself and notes by his fellow Gentleman's Magazine contributor Stephen Weston. Weston's own work also featured in the output of the Arabic Press, including his philological account of Remains of Arabic in the Spanish and Portuguese languages.

Other works he published included tracts for the Religious Tract Society, patriotic songs for the Napoleonic Wars, and texts by the self-styled prophetess Joanna Southcott. Of Southcott, it was even claimed by George Smeeton that Rousseau had found, in a rubbish heap in Clerkenwell, the seal which was subsequently adopted by her for her followers, and used to seal their 'passports to Heaven'. While working as a printer, he also taught Persian.

Despite the expertise of Rousseau and his colleagues, the Arabic Press was not a commercial success, and although it was still open in 1811, it closed after a few years of operation. Thereafter, Rousseau edited a variety of works for booksellers and, as he was more interested in raising money to support himself and his family rather than achieve literary fame, most of his works appeared under a range of pseudonyms. Rousseau's obituary in the Gentleman's Magazine said that "they have, however, proved generally successful to the publishers, as their objects were useful; and nothing ever appeared in them contrary to good morals, or the established religion and government".

== Death ==
Around 1817 he suffered a paralytic stroke whose effects worsened with time. Combined with a facial cancer, this illness eventually made him incapable of holding a pen or even of feeding himself. In dire poverty, and with two daughters wholly dependent on him, he was supported by a large grant from the Royal Literary Fund. He died at his home in Ray Street, Clerkenwell, on 4 December 1820, at the age of 57. The remains of the grant enabled his daughters to give him a decent burial in the churchyard of St James Church, Clerkenwell. An obituary in Hone's Year Book reported that 'His researches distracted his attention from the "main chance;" he lost it too late in life to regain it; suffered much mental affliction under great privations; and perished in obscurity from want.'

== Legacy ==
Rousseau's works were immediately influential, especially among the employees of the East India Company. A list of recommended publications accompanying the second volume of the East India Vade-Mecum in 1810 included Rousseau's Flowers of Persian Literature and Dictionary of Mahomedan Law, along with Balfour's Forms of Herkern, which Rousseau had published. Apart from a small entry in the Dictionary of National Biography, the legacy of Samuel Rousseau is virtually unknown today and he lacks any serious attempt at a biography. Some writers have noted the possibility for further research into his life and connections. In 2022, Taymaz Pour Mohammad of Northwestern University presented a paper entitled The Scent of Adab’s Rose: On the Olfactory Aesthetics of Samuel Rousseau's "The Flowers of the Persian Language" at the annual conference of the American Comparative Literature Association.

== Bibliography ==
=== Under his own name ===
- Flowers of Persian Literature (1801)
- Dictionary of Mohammedan Law (1802)
- Persian & English Vocabulary (1802)
- Richardson's Specimen of Persian Poetry; or, Odes of Hafiz (1804)
- A dictionary of words used in the East Indies (1805)
- Book of Knowledge; or, A Grammar of the Persian Language (1805)
- A Persian Copy Book (undated) giving examples of nastaliq script

=== Pseudonymously ===
- An Essay on Punctuation (1815)
- Annals of Health and Long Life (1818)
- Principles of Punctuation (1818)
- Principles of Elocution (1819)
