= Robert Elder (minister) =

Scottish minister (1808–1892)

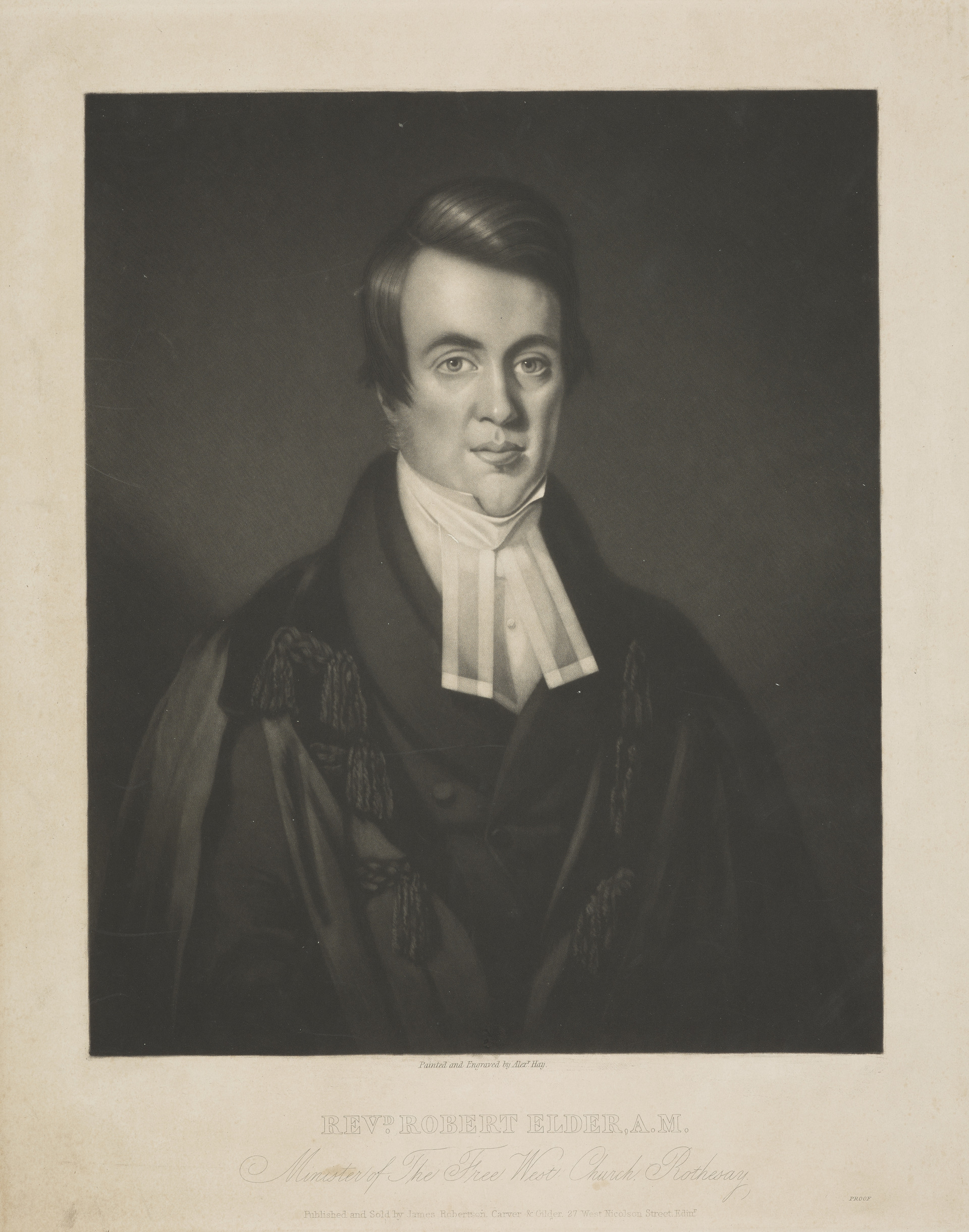
- Church: Church of Scotland; Free Church of Scotland

Personal details
- Born: 1808
- Died: 1891 (aged 82–83)

minister of Kilbrandon and Kilchattan
- In office 23 March 1831 – 18 December 1834

minister of Killin
- In office 18 December 1834 – 11 October 1838

minister of St Paul's, Edinburgh
- In office 11 October 1838 – 18 May 1843

minister of Free St Paul's, Edinburgh
- In office 1843 – 24 May 1847

minister of West Free Church, Rothesay
- In office 24 May 1847 – 1 June 1882

Moderator of the General Assembly of the Free Church of Scotland
- In office 20 May 1871 – close

Robert Elder (1808–1892) was a Scottish minister of the Free Church of Scotland who served as Moderator of the General Assembly to the Free Church 1871/72.

== Life ==
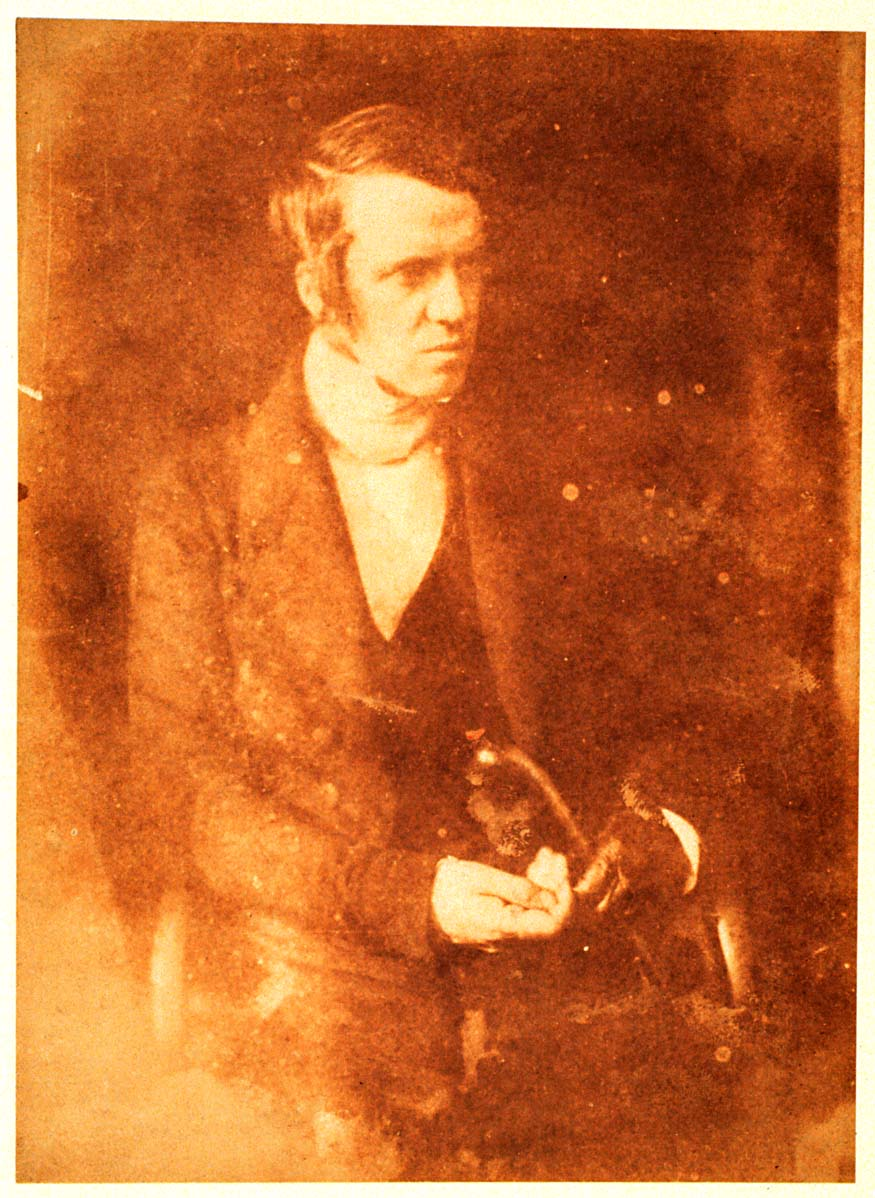
Elder by Hill and Adamson

He was born in Inverary on 28 July 1808, the son of John Elder, Comptroller of Customs, and his wife, Euphemia Beith. The family moved to Campbeltown while he was young and he was educated at Campbeltown Grammar School.

He studied divinity at Glasgow University graduating MA in 1825 and was licensed to preach by the Presbytery of Kintyre in November 1829.

He was ordained by the Church of Scotland at Kilbrandon in March 1831, in succession to Alexander Beith. He was translated to Killin in 1834, and in 1838 to St Paul's Church, Edinburgh.

He left the established church in the Disruption of 1843 creating Free St Paul's Church in Edinburgh and moved to the Free West Church in Rothesay on the isle of Bute in 1847. In 1871 he succeeded the Rev John Wilson as Moderator of the General Assembly, the highest position in the Free Church. He was succeeded in turn in 1872 by Rev Charles John Brown.

Glasgow University awarded him an honorary Doctor of Divinity in 1871.

He retired to 1 Admiral Terrace in Edinburgh in 1882.

He died in Edinburgh on 30 March 1892. He is buried in the East Preston Street Burial Ground.

== Family ==
In April 1838 he married Margaret Robson (1807–1901) daughter of John Robson of Oban and had issue —

- Euphemia Beith, born 21 January 1839
- John Robson, born 22 June 1840, died 23 May 1897
- Margaret Matilda, born 1 April 1842
- Julia, born 24 September 1844, died 19 March 1846
- Nancy Eliza, born 4 July 1846.

They had at least four daughters, two of which married Free Church ministers. His son John Robson Elder, was also a Free Church minister.

== Publications ==
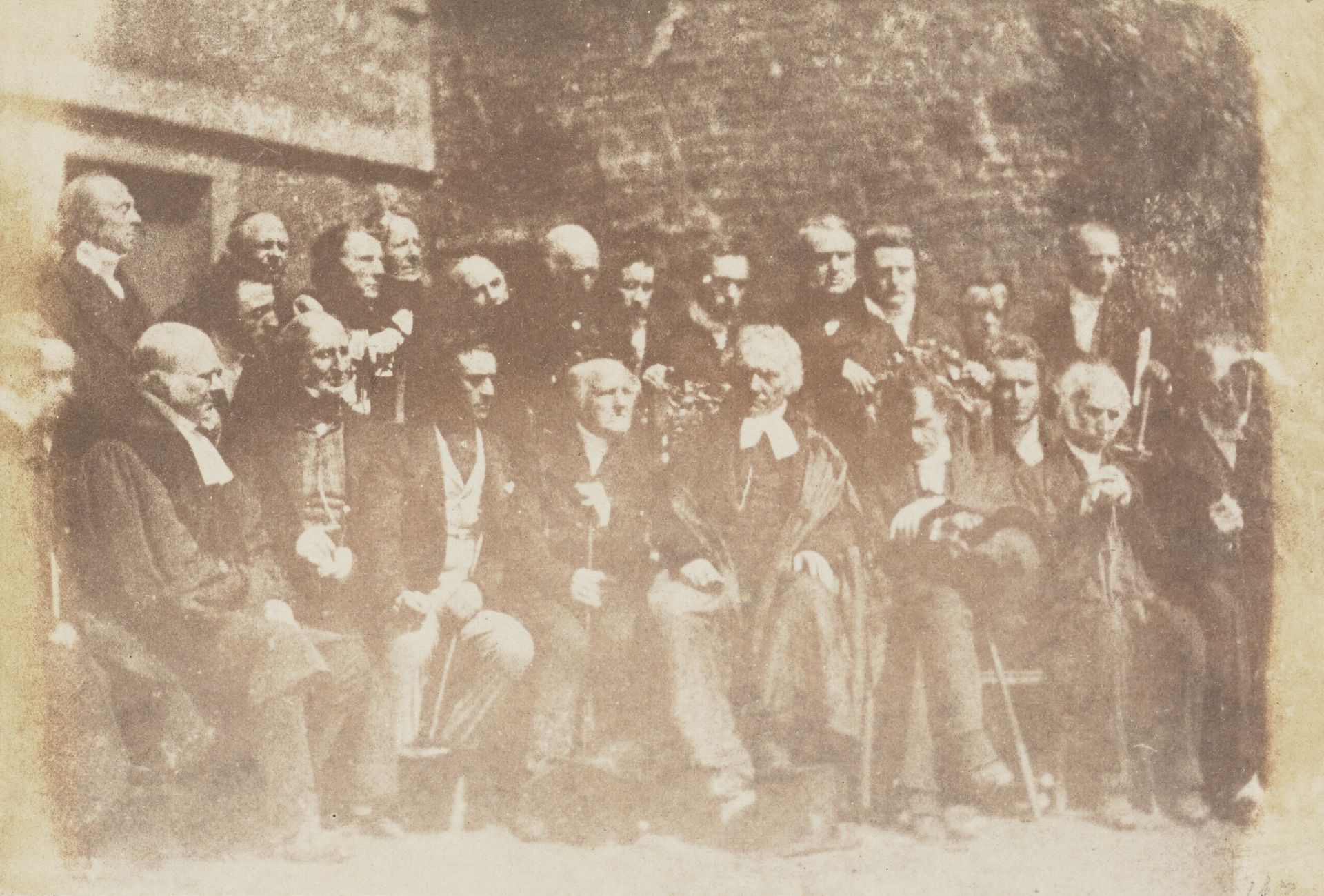
Robert Elder and Edinburgh Presbytery by Hill & Adamson

- Non-Intrusion, a lecture (Edinburgh, 1840)
- Danger of Spiritual Ignorance, a sermon (Edinburgh, 1841)
- On the Conversion of the Jews, a lecture (Edinburgh, 1842)
- Sermon in Vol. II, Free Church Pulpit (Edinburgh, 1846)
- The Soul's Deliverance, a lecture (Glasgow, 1861)
- Present Trial and Future Glory, Memorial Sermons (Glasgow, 1868)
- Thesis on Doctrine of the Sacraments (Glasgow, 1871)
- The Unchanging Saviour, Memorial Sermons (Greenock, 1876)
- Free Church Principles, a lecture (Glasgow, 1877)
- Sermon in Vol. Modern Scottish Pulpit (Edinburgh, 1880).
