= Francis Johnson (linguist) =

British linguist (c. 1795–1876)

Francis Johnson (c. 1795/96 – 29 January 1876) was a British linguist.

He taught Sanskrit, Telugu and Bengali at the East India Company College between 1824 and 1855. He compiled a comprehensive Persian, Arabic, and English dictionary ("A dictionary, Persian, Arabic, and English. By Francis Johnson." London : Wm. H. Allen and Co., 7, Leadenhall-Street, 1852), which is the main thing he is remembered for. In 1829, Johnson published an expanded edition of John Richardson's Persian-Arabic-English dictionary, which was presented as the third edition of Richardson's dictionary (the second edition of Richardson's was in year 1810). The dictionary presented Persian and Arabic words and translated them to English. Johnson's 1852 edition was more comprehensive than any earlier edition in English.

As a young man, he travelled to Rome and Athens with Charles Lock Eastlake and Charles Barry and others, returning to England in 1824.

A nonconformist, he funded the construction in 1829 of a Congregationalist chapel at Hertford Heath, and its subsequent operation.

He also published

- Johnson, Francis. Hitopadesa. The Sanskrit Text of the First Book, or Mitra-Labha; with a Grammatical Analysis, Alphabetically Arranged. Prepared for the Use of the East-India College, by Francis Johnson, Professor. London: James Madden and Co. Successors to Parbury and Co., 8 Leadenhall Street, 1840.

He married in 1857 and died in Hertford in 1876.
