= John Richardson (orientalist) =

English orientalist (1740/41–1795)

John Richardson (1740/41–1795), FAS of Wadham College, Oxford, was the editor of the first Persian-Arabic-English dictionary in 1778–1780. His seminal work on Persian grammar, written in collaboration with Sir William Jones, was noteworthy amongst the early works on this subject; and it remains significant in the context of that philological foundation from which all subsequent grammatical studies were to evolve.

Richardson's scholarly compilation was organized in a format similar to Mesgnien-Meninski's Thesaurus Linguarum Orientalis, Turcicæ, Arabicæ, Persicæ (1680).

Each book in the two-volume set was sold separately; many more of the first part (the Persian-Arabic-English volume) were sold than the second part (the English-Persian-Arabic volume). When booksellers found themselves with an overstock of first edition broken sets, a greater number of copies of the second edition's first book were printed.

Richardson's ground-breaking scholarship was more broadly disseminated in Charles Wilkins' several revised versions of the dictionary. Subsequent work by the 19th century philologists Francis Johnson, Francis Joseph Steingass and others ensured that Richardson's name continued to be well known as an orientalist and as a scholar.

== Selected works ==
Richardson's reputation has been burnished by the work of subsequent lexicographers who have revised and extended his work.

- Richardson, John. (1777). A Dictionary, Persian, Arabic, and English. Oxford: Clarendon Press. [OCLC: 84952352]
  - Rousseau, Samuel, William Jones, Ḥāfiẓ, and John Richardson. (1805). The Flowers of Persian Literature: Containing Extracts from the Most Celebrated Authors, in Prose and Verse; with a Translation into English: Being Intended as a Companion to Sir William Jones's Persian Grammar, to which is Prefixed an Essay on the Language and Literature of Persia and A specimen of Persian poetry or Odes of Hafez. London: S. Rousseau. [OCLC: 29332319]
  - Wilkens, Charles, ed. (1810). A Vocabulary Persian, Arabic, and English; Abridged from the Quarto Edition of Richardson's Dictionary. London: F. & C. Rivingson. [OCLC: 5631372]
  - Johnson, Francis, ed. (1852). A Dictionary, Persian, Arabic, and English. London: W. H. Allen. [OCLC: 29094740] -- "The original compilation of Meninski, based upon native lexicons, and amplified and corrected from the same by Mr. Richardson and Sir Charles Wilkins, is the acknowledged groundwork of the author's labours"
  - Steingass, Francis Joseph, ed. (1892). A Comprehensive Persian-English Dictionary: Including the Arabic Words and Phrases to be Met with in Persian Literature, being Johnson and Richardson's Persian, Arabic, and English Dictionary Revised, Enlarged. London: Crosby Lockwood & Son (Low). [OCLC: 43797675]
