= Independent Presbyterian Church (Memphis, Tennessee) =

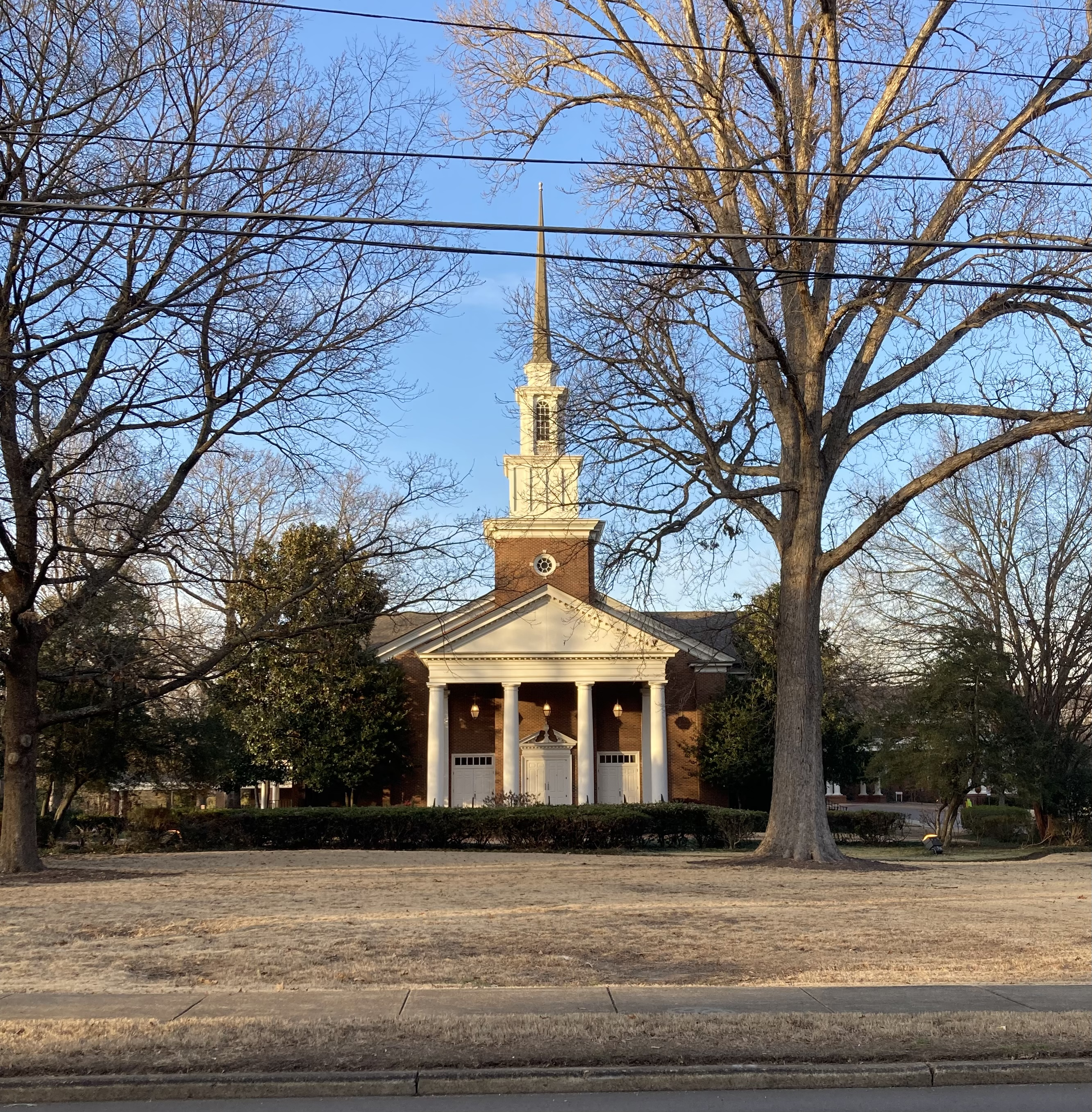
- The sanctuary of Independent Presbyterian Church in 2025

- Location within Tennessee
- 35.132136°N 89.903850°W
- Location: 4738 Walnut Grove Road, Memphis, Tennessee
- Country: United States
- Denomination: Presbyterian Church in America
- Previous denomination: Independent congregationalism (1965-2000)
- Website: Official website

History
- Founded: 1965

Architecture
- Years built: c. 1968 with additions in the 1970s

The Independent Presbyterian Church is a Presbyterian Church in America in Memphis, Tennessee.

== History ==
The Independent Presbyterian Church of Memphis was incorporated on March 17, 1965. The church met at the Plaza Theatre on Poplar Avenue for a little more than the first two years of its existence. The Reverend Leonard T. Van Horn served as the church's first pastor. In May 1968, the Reverend James E. Moore was hired to serve as the senior minister. By this time, the church had moved to its current location on Walnut Grove Road. During Moore's tenure, the church began a ministry with Palmer Home for Children. In July 1974, the Reverend Robert C. Laman became senior minister. The Reverend John P. Sartelle Sr. began his service as senior minister in November 1977. Under his leadership a college and career ministry began, the church's membership grew to 2,200, and construction began on an expanded sanctuary, a large fellowship hall, educational and office space, and a gymnasium. The church ministries would grow to include those for children, youth, women, senior adults, music, and missions. In 2000, the church's congregation voted to join the Presbyterian Church in America (PCA) after 35 years of congregationalism. In 2006, Dr. John Hardie became senior minister, and in 2009, the Reverend Richie Sessions became the sixth senior minister to lead the church. Since January 2017, Dr. Sean Michael Lucas has been the senior pastor.

== Theology ==
Common beliefs of Independent Presbyterian align with principles of traditional Reformed Christian faith known as the Five Points of Calvinism:

- Total depravity of man. The church believes that man is totally at enmity with God, cf. Romans 3:10-23.
- Unconditional election by the grace of God. It is thought in the church that long before man was created, God chose or predestined some to everlasting life, cf. Ephesians 1:4 and 5.
- Particular atonement. Their belief is that God sent Jesus Christ to die as a substitute for the sins of a large but specific number of people; cf. Romans 8:29 and 30.
- The irresistible grace of God. This is the idea that the Holy Spirit will redeem particular persons by moving upon them; cf. John 3:5 and 6.
- The perseverance of the saints. It is thought that God can enable a saved person to persevere to the end.

== Missions ==
The church is involved with several outreach mission works. Their primary target areas are Memphis, the Mid-South, Miami, Western United States, the United Kingdom, Germany, Colombia, Greece, Rwanda, and various regions in the 10/40 window.
