= Presbyterian Church in America =

Conservative Reformed Christian denomination in the United States and Canada

- Logo of the Presbyterian Church in America
- Abbreviation: PCA
- Classification: Protestant
- Orientation: Presbyterian
- Scripture: Protestant Bible
- Theology: Evangelical; Reformed
- Polity: Presbyterian
- Moderator: Melton "Mel" Duncan
- Stated clerk: Fred Greco
- Associations: North American Presbyterian and Reformed Council; World Reformed Fellowship
- Region: United States and Canada Presbytery in Chile Forming provisional presbytery in Paraguay, and churches in various cities in Germany, Japan, South Korea, Grand Cayman Island and the Czech Republic
- Headquarters: Lawrenceville, Georgia
- Origin: December 1973; Birmingham, Alabama
- Separated from: Presbyterian Church in the United States
- Absorbed: Reformed Presbyterian Church, Evangelical Synod (1982); Christian Presbyterian Church (absorbed part of the churches after 1995).
- Separations: Reformed Presbyterian Church in the United States (1983); American Reformation Presbyterian Church (1994); Covenant Reformed Presbyterian Church (1997); Evangelical Reformed Presbyterian Church (2006); Vanguard Presbytery (2020).
- Congregations: 1,959 (end of 2025)
- Members: 405,634 (end of 2025)
- Ministers: 5,388 (end of 2025)
- Official website: www.pcanet.org

The Presbyterian Church in America (PCA) is the second-largest Presbyterian church body in the United States, behind only the Presbyterian Church (USA), and the largest conservative Calvinist denomination in the country. The PCA is Reformed in theology and presbyterian in government.

== History ==
=== Background ===
Presbyterians trace their history to the Protestant Reformation in the 16th century. The Presbyterian heritage, and much of its theology, began with the French theologian and lawyer John Calvin (1509–1564), whose writings solidified much of the Reformed thinking that came before him in the form of the sermons and writings of Huldrych Zwingli. From Calvin's headquarters in Geneva, Switzerland, the Reformed movement spread to other parts of Europe. John Knox, a former Catholic priest from Scotland who studied with Calvin in Geneva, took Calvin's teachings back to Scotland and led the Scottish Reformation of 1560. As a result, the Church of Scotland embraced Reformed theology and presbyterian polity. Immigrants from Scotland and Ireland brought Presbyterianism to America as early as 1640, and immigration would remain a large source of growth throughout the colonial era. Another source of growth were a number of New England Puritans who left the Congregational churches because they preferred presbyterian polity. In 1706, seven ministers led by Francis Makemie established the first American presbytery at Philadelphia, which was followed by the creation of the Synod of Philadelphia in 1717.

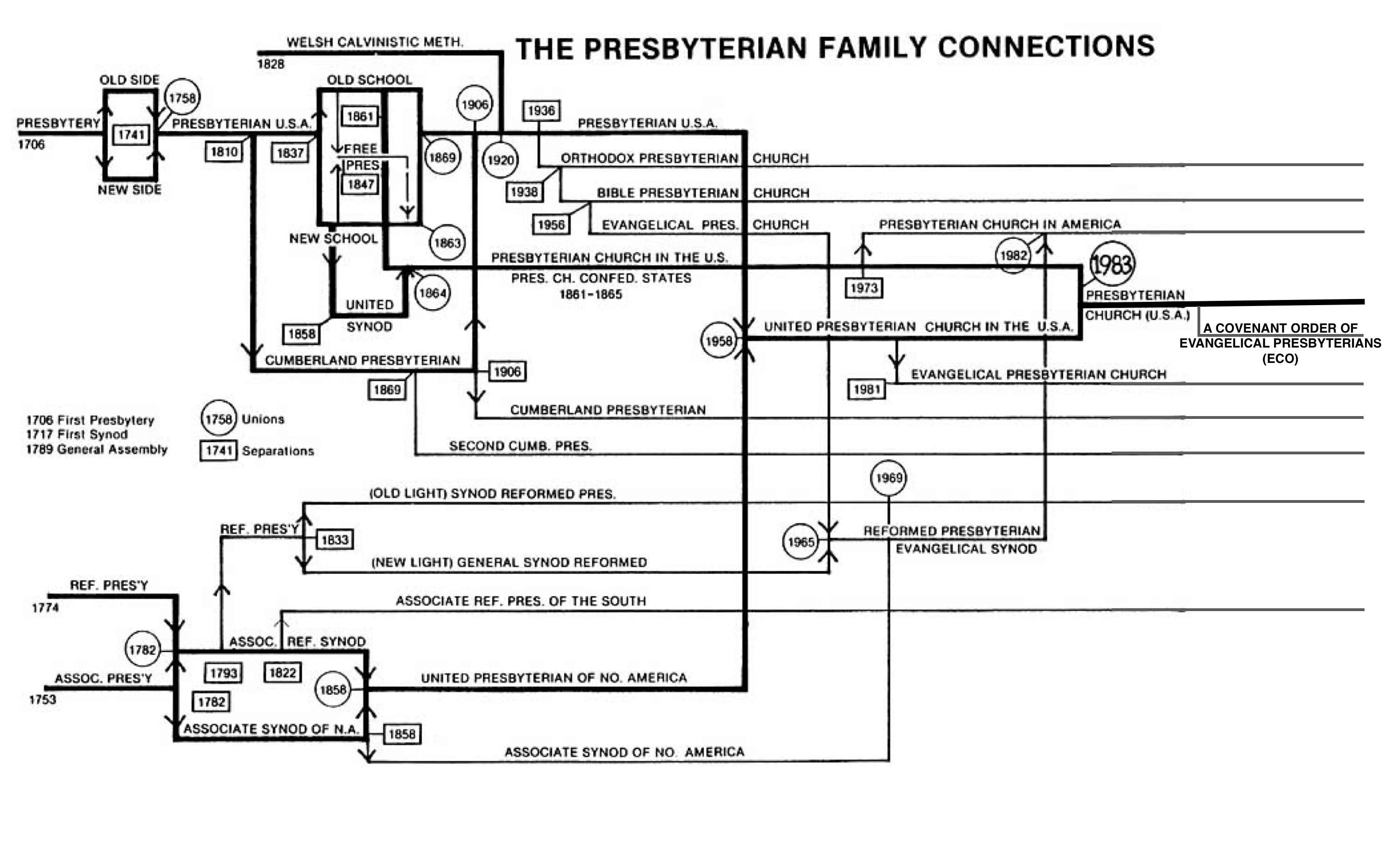
The family tree of Presbyterian denominations in the United States, courtesy of the Presbyterian Historical Society

Notable Churches

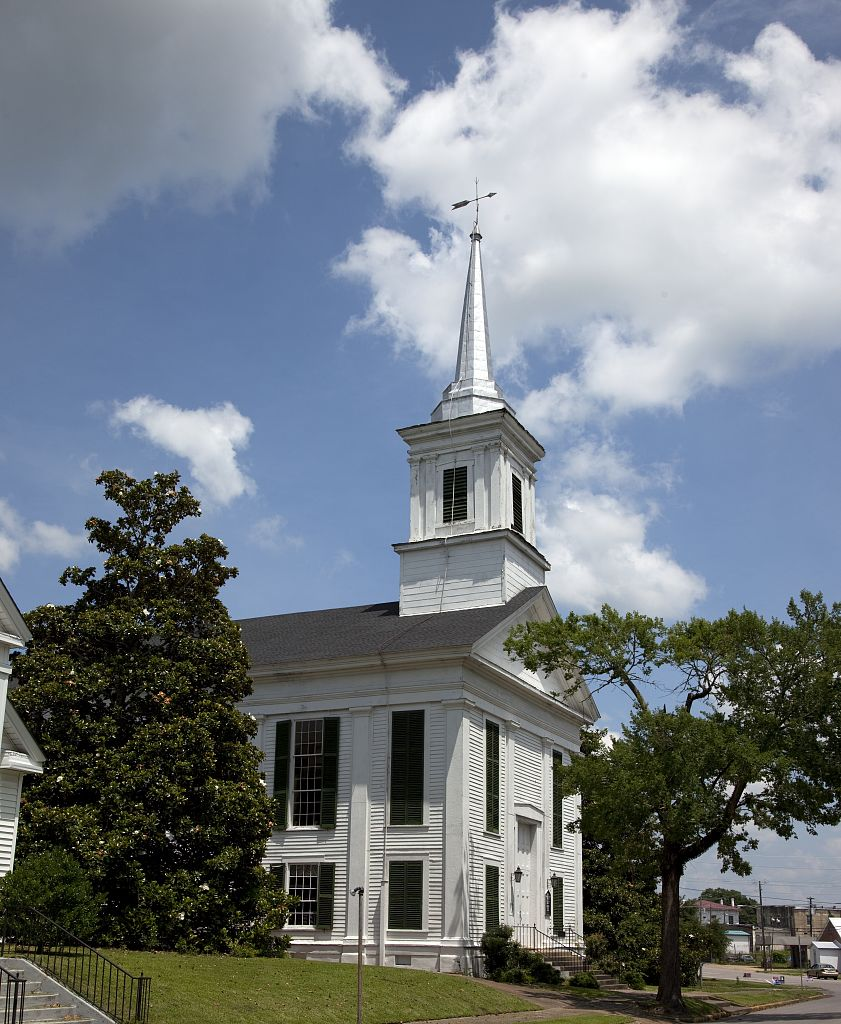
First Presbyterian Church in Eutaw, Alabama, a historic Southern Presbyterian Church

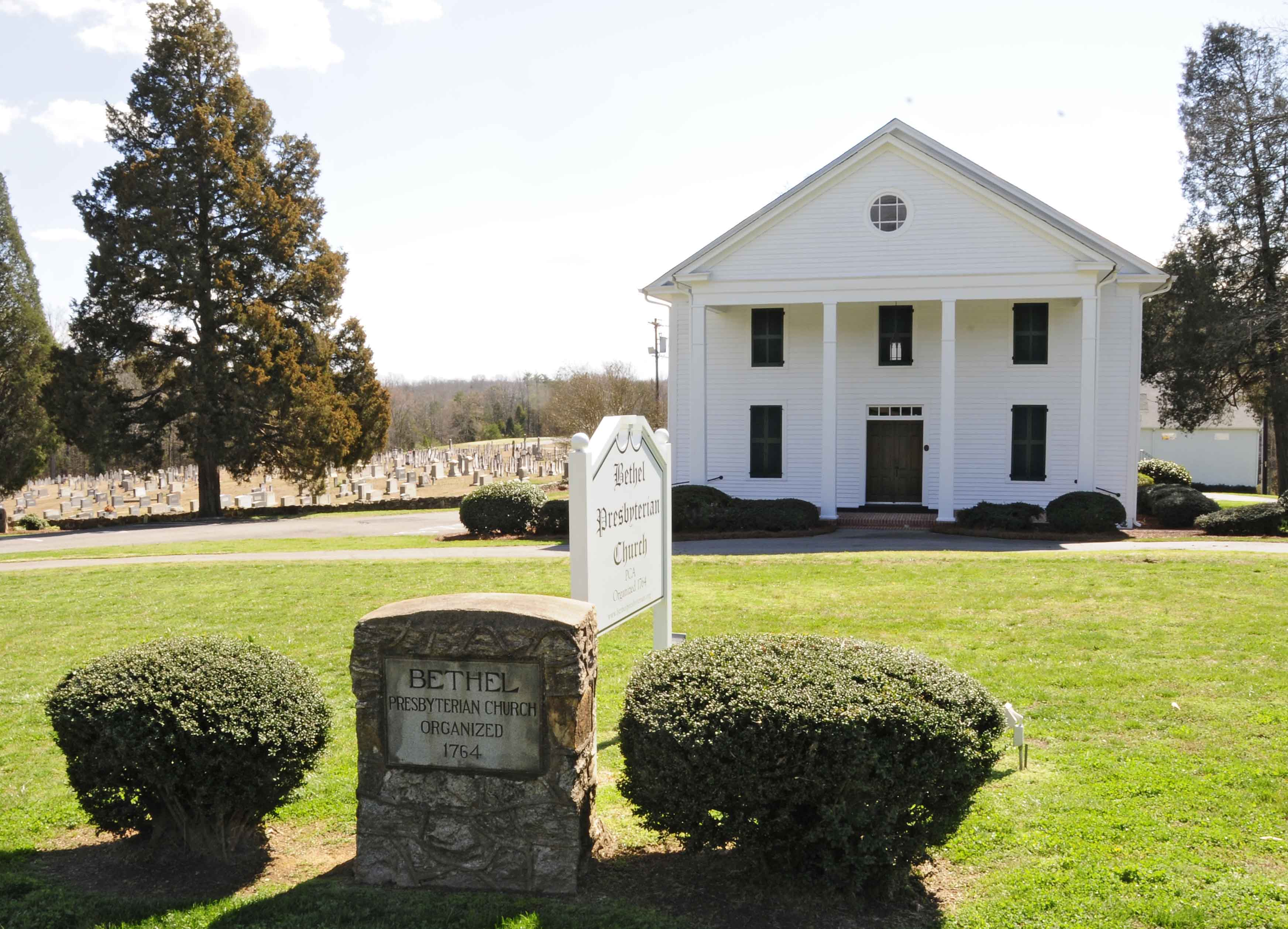
Bethel Presbyterian Church in Clover, South Carolina, founded 1764, the oldest of the founding churches

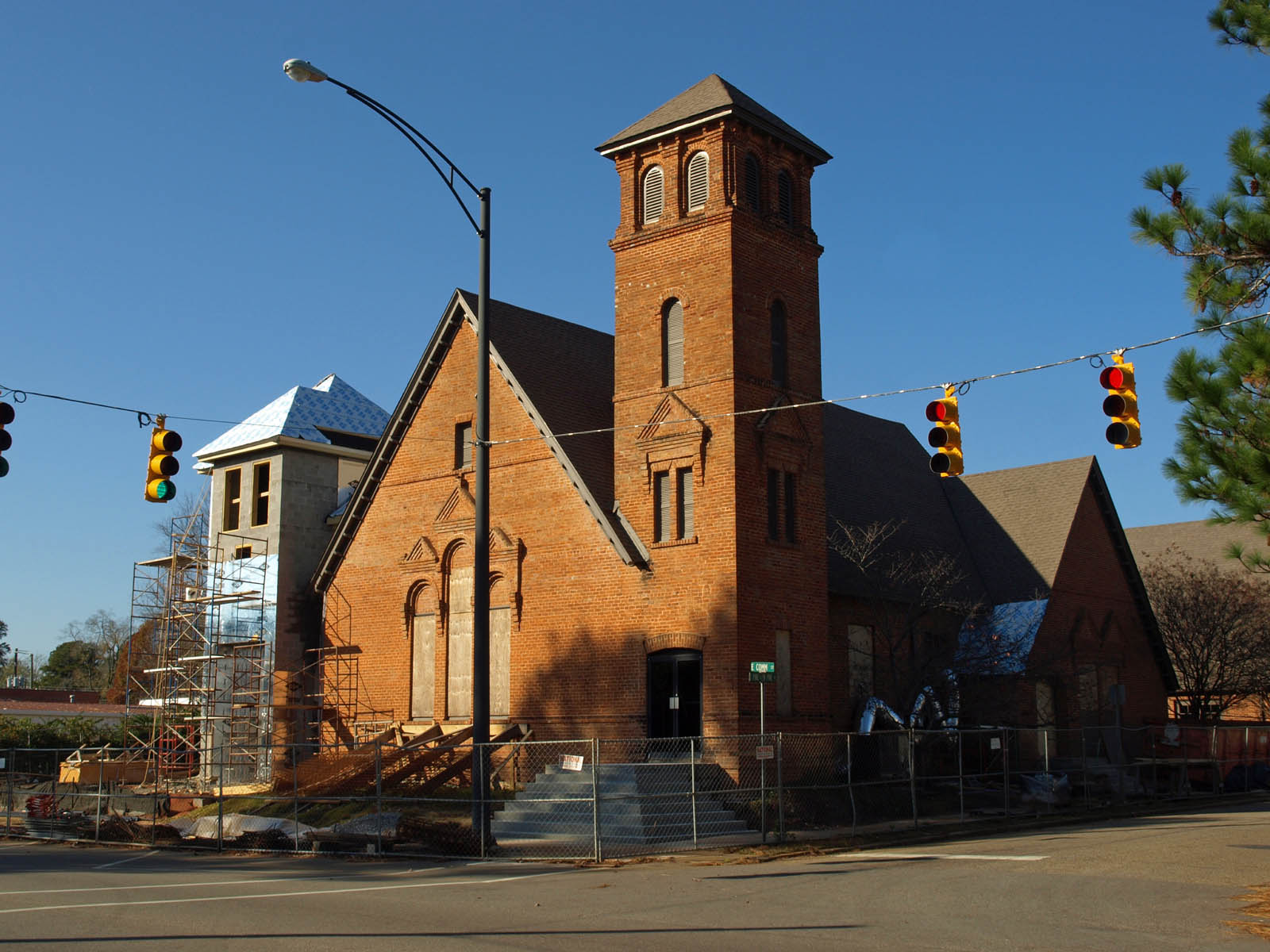
First Presbyterian Church, Greenville, Alabama, founded 1820

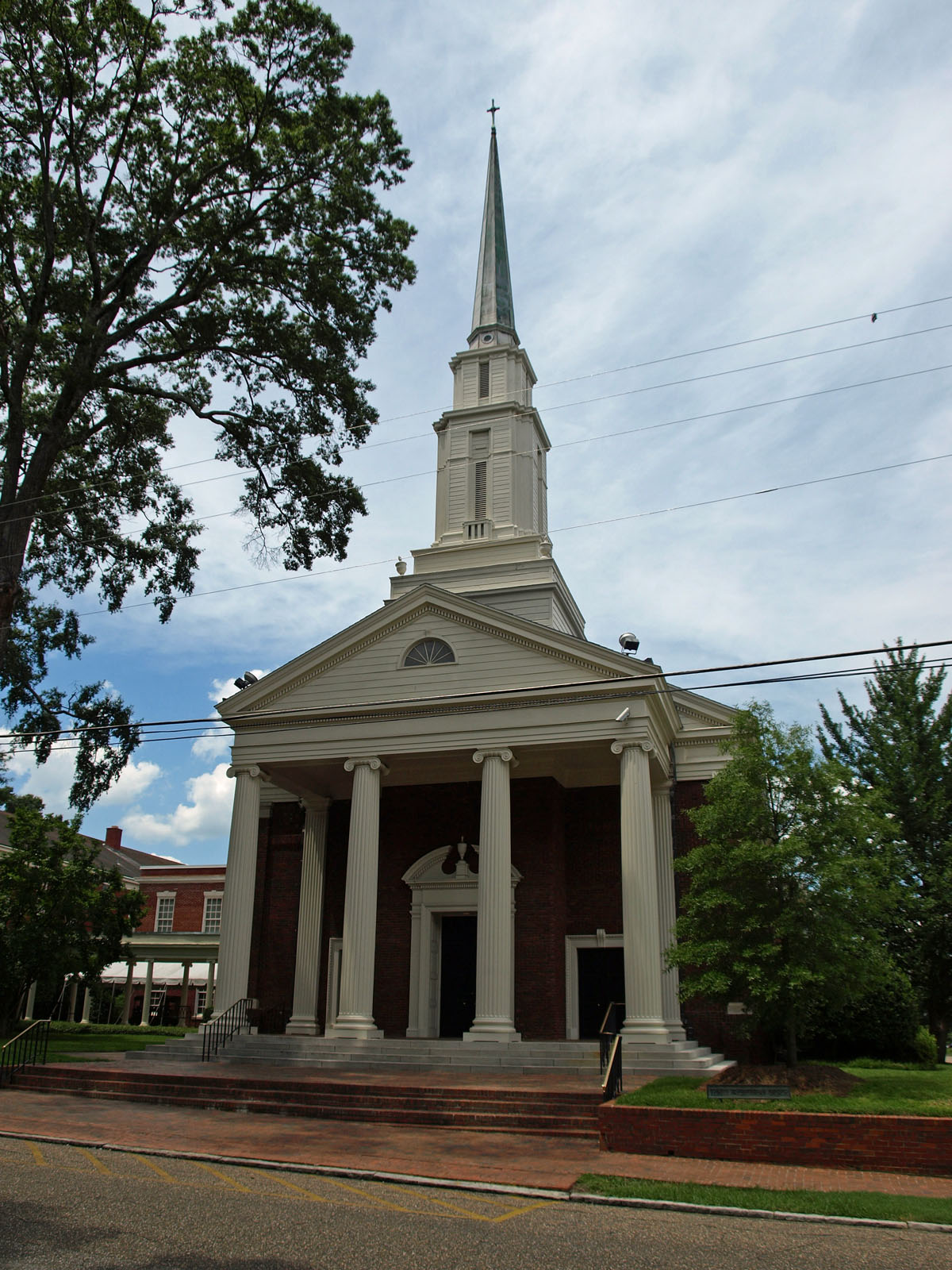
Trinity Presbyterian Church Montgomery, Alabama

The PCA has its roots in theological controversies over liberalism in Christianity and neo-orthodoxy that had been a point of contention in the Presbyterian Church in the United States which had split from the mainline Presbyterian Church in the U.S.A along regional lines at the beginning of the Civil War. While the Fundamentalist–Modernist Controversy had led to a split in the PC-USA in the mid-1930s, leading to the formation of the Orthodox Presbyterian Church and Bible Presbyterian Church, the PCUS remained intact. However, beginning in 1942, as the PCUS began to experiment with confessional revision, and later, when neo-orthodoxy and liberalism began to become influential in the PCUS' seminaries, and attempts were made to merge with the more liberal PC-USA and its successor, the United Presbyterian Church in the U.S.A., renewal groups began to be formed, including the Presbyterian Churchmen United (PCU), an organization of conservative pastors formed by more than 500 ministers, which ran 3/4-page statements of their beliefs in 30 newspapers, the Presbyterian Evangelistic Fellowship, which conducted revivals in PCUS churches, and the Concerned Presbyterians. They sought to reaffirm the Westminster Confession of Faith as the fullest and clearest exposition of biblical faith, which many conservatives felt that presbyteries had been violating by receiving ministers who refused to affirm the virgin birth and bodily resurrection, and to expect all pastors and leaders to affirm the inerrancy of scripture. Opponents of the merger took specific issue with the United Presbyterian Church's adherence to the Auburn Affirmation and the Confession of 1967; the Southern Presbyterian denomination rejected the adoption of these confessions as official standards, noting amorphous biblical doctrine, lax sexual ethic, and conversations with other church bodies that rejected the Reformed faith, such as those explored by the Consultation on Church Union.

It remains controversial as to whether racial tensions may have contributed to the formation of the PCA. Many in the PCA have adamantly maintained that race played little role in the genesis of the new denomination, but many outside the PCA have a historical memory of racial animus contributing to the desire for exodus from the Southern Presbyterian denomination, the PCUS. On June 23, 2016, the General Assembly of the Presbyterian Church in America voted to approve a statement on racial reconciliation that specifically recognized "corporate and historical sins, including those committed during the Civil Rights era, and continuing racial sins of ourselves and our fathers such as the segregation of worshipers by race; the exclusion of persons from Church membership on the basis of race; the exclusion of churches, or elders, from membership in the Presbyteries on the basis of race; the teaching that the Bible sanctions racial segregation and discourages inter-racial marriage; the participation in and defense of white supremacist organizations; and the failure to live out the gospel imperative that ‘love does no wrong to a neighbor’ (Romans 13:10)." This admission of "historical sins" during the Civil Rights era has helped to ameliorate the conflict that some black members of the PCA may have felt about the denomination's failure to fully embrace and protect the rights of African Americans both within and outside of the church during the PCA's formative years.

Conservatives also felt the church should disavow the ordination of women. They also criticized the PCUS Board of Christian Education's published literature and believed that the denomination's Board of World Missions no longer placed its primary emphasis on carrying out the Great Commission. In 1966, conservatives within the PCUS, concerned about the denominational seminaries, founded Reformed Theological Seminary.

Finally, when word came out that a planned Plan of Union between the UPCUSA and PCUS lacked an "escape clause" which would have allowed for PCUS congregations that wanted no part in the planned union to leave without forfeiture of property, the steering committee of several of the renewal groups called for conservative PCUS congregations to leave.

In December 1973, delegates, representing some 260 congregations with a combined communicant membership of over 41,000 that had left the PCUS, gathered at Briarwood Presbyterian Church in Birmingham, Alabama, and organized the National Presbyterian Church, which later became the Presbyterian Church in America.

After protests from a UPCUSA congregation of the same name in Washington, D.C., the denomination at its Second General Assembly (1974) renamed itself the National Reformed Presbyterian Church, then adopted its present name the next day. At its founding, the PCA consisted of 16 presbyteries.

Within a few years the church grew to include more than 500 congregations and 80,000 members.

=== Growth ===
==== Kenyon Case – PCA growth in the Mid-Atlantic (1975) ====
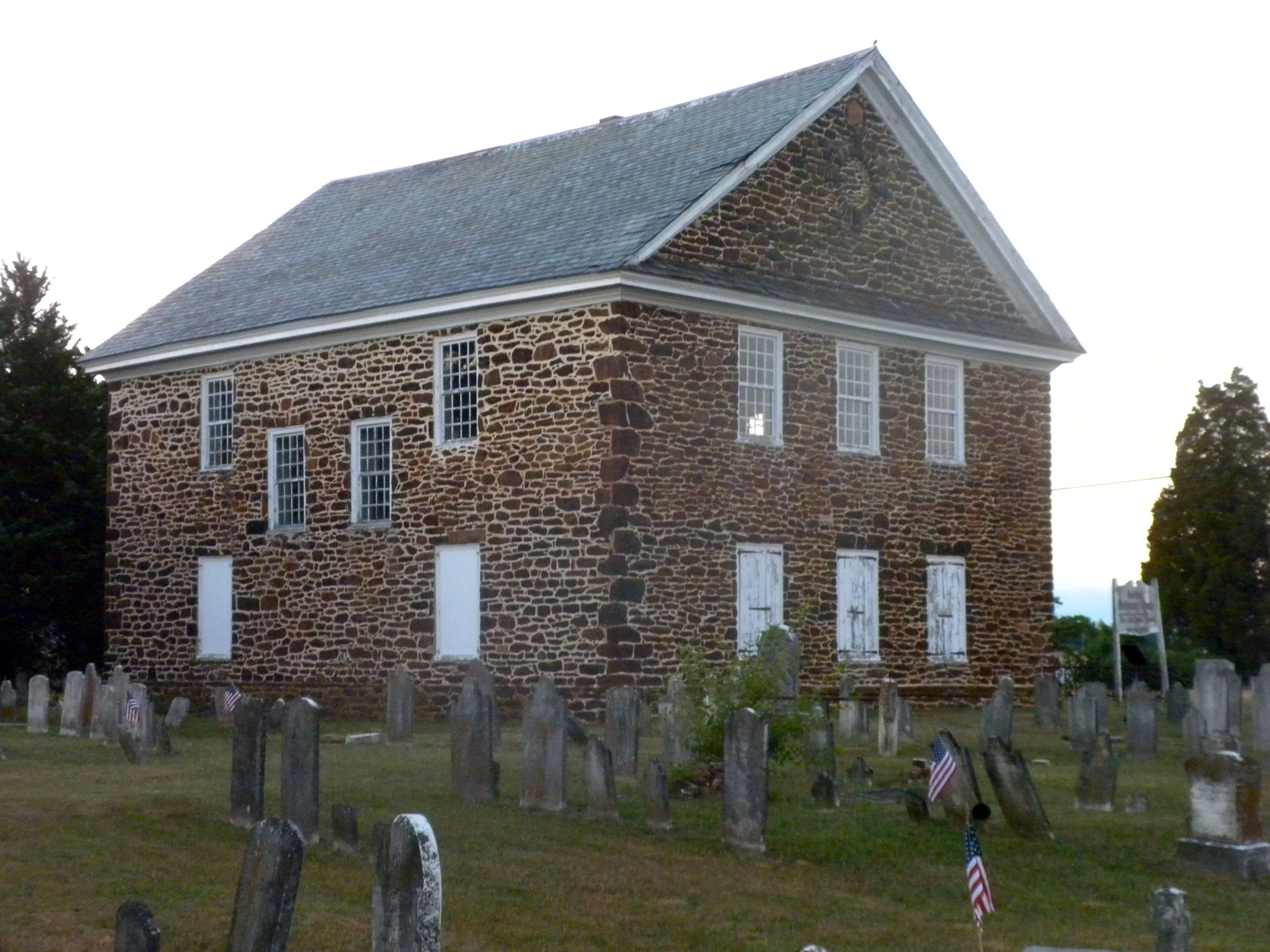
Fairfield Presbyterian Church, Fairton, New Jersey the oldest congregation in the denomination (founded in 1680), left the UPCUSA in 1971, joined the PCA in 1980

During the 1970s, the denomination added a significant number of congregations outside the South when several UPCUSA churches in Ohio and Pennsylvania joined. This move was precipitated by a case regarding an ordination candidate, Walter Wynn Kenyon, denied by the Pittsburgh Presbytery because he refused to support women's ordination (a decision upheld by the UPCUSA General Assembly). The seceder churches formed the Ascension Presbytery, officially organised on July 29, 1975. That year, a minister of that presbytery described its history as follows:

The constituents of the Presbytery of the Ascension were almost exclusively members, in one way or another, of the United Presbyterian Church in the United States of America (UPCUSA). ...

Walter Kenyon was an honors graduate of the Pittsburgh Theological Seminary. ... Mr. Kenyon ... stated that he could not in good conscience participate in the ordination of a woman. He said that it was his understanding of Scripture that prevented such involvement, but went on to say that he would not stand in the way of such an ordination, if such was the desire of a church which he would happen to serve. Immediately there arose much dissent, and such dissent grew until the overwhelming majority of the church endorsed the judicial verdict which banned Kenyon and all future Kenyons from the pulpits of the UPCUSA. Furthermore, there was both explicit and implicit action which was taken against those men already ordained.

The Rev. Arthur C. Broadwick (and the Union United Presbyterian Church USA of Pittsburgh) and the Rev. Carl W. Bogue Jr. (and the Allenside UPCUSA of Akron, OH) were already involved in litigations which involved this issue. ... When the Permanent Judicial Commission of the UPCUSA ruled that Mr. Kenyon could not be ordained it effectively elevated this doctrine concerning social relationships to the place of being a major doctrine of the church. ...

Such action by the Permanent Judicial Commission led to a crisis for all of those pastors and elders who held to the traditional views on this question and who were now considered heretics. Accordingly, to uphold the peace, unity and purity of the church, most of the men who made up the membership of the charter presbytery peaceably withdrew from the UPCUSA. ...

A fitting conclusion to this description of the genesis of the Presbytery of the Ascension is the mention of the Presbytery's new affiliation, the Presbyterian Church in America. In the Fall of 1974, men who were affected by the drift of the Kenyon Case, sent four representatives, from an informal committee which was considering alternatives to the UPCUSA (i.e., in case that body should make a ruling against Mr. Kenyon which would affect the church as a whole), to the second General Assembly of the Presbyterian Church in America (which became the Presbyterian Church in America). These four pastors were the Rev. A.C. Broadwick, the Rev. K.E. Perrin, the Rev. R.E. Knodel Jr., and the Rev. W.L. Thompson, on behalf of the larger concerned group, seeking a historically Reformed body which was also evangelical and mission minded. While this small entourage went to Macon, Georgia with many suspicions and questions, they returned overjoyed that there was an option such as the Presbyterian Church in America.

Adopted from Reformationanglicanism.blogspot July 29, 1975 A.D. Ascension Presbytery (PCA) Officially Formed

—

For example, seceders from Union UPCUSA formed Providence Presbyterian Church in Pittsburgh under the leadership of Broadwick.

==== PCA expands in the Midwest ====
Dozens of churches from the Midwest became part of the Presbyterian Church in America after leaving the Synod of the West of the PC(USA), formerly called the United Presbyterian Church in the USA. This became the Siouxlands Presbytery composed of only South Dakota, but in 1982 when the Joining and Receiving took place with the Reformed Presbyterian Church, Evangelical Synod, boundaries were expanded to cover Minnesota, North Dakota, Nebraska and Iowa.

In the state of Michigan, dissenting Christian Reformed and RCA church members formed Covenant Presbyterian Church in Holland, MI in 1996 under the leadership of Tom Vanden Heuvel, former pastor of First Christian Reformed Church (Grand Rapids, Michigan), who claimed that the Christian Reformed Church(CRC) departed from its original commitment to the clarity and authority of Scripture. At that time, another CRC church joined the PCA in Texas, as well as in New York, the Monsey Christian Church.

==== Departures from the PCUS (1973–1990) ====
Dissenting conservative Southern Presbyterian Churches joined the PCA until the early 1990s. Early PCA growth was largely through secessions from the Southern Presbyterian Church (PCUS), which from 1983 to 1990 allowed churches to leave with their property. About 110 to 120 churches did come in during that period of time to the PCA with their properties, allowed by various PC(USA) Presbyteries. Since that time, PCA growth has been largely through church planting and local congregational outreach rather than by transfers of entire churches from other denominations. PC(USA) ministers are now required to agree with the ordination of women, which the PCA opposes. However, since 1996 about 23 PC(USA) congregations have joined the PCA. As of the 2014 PC(USA) General assembly, most churches withdrawing from the PC(USA) are joining the Evangelical Presbyterian Church or the newly formed ECO due to their acceptance of women ministers, though since then many conservative PC(USA) groups and even whole congregations have affiliated with the PCA.

==== Merger with the Reformed Presbyterian Church, Evangelical Synod (1982) ====
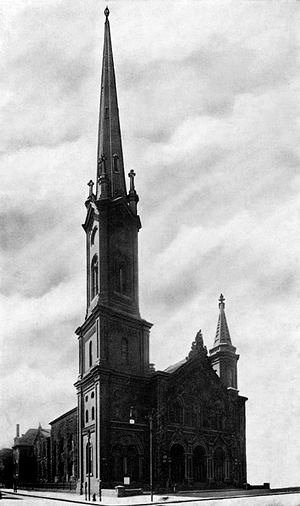
Tenth Presbyterian Church in Philadelphia, Pennsylvania, which joined the PCA as part of the merger with the Reformed Presbyterian Church, Evangelical Synod

In 1982, the PCA merged with the Reformed Presbyterian Church, Evangelical Synod In 1982, the PCA merged with the Reformed Presbyterian Church, Evangelical Synod (RPCES), which had congregations in the United States and Canada. Discussions had begun in 1979 with the Reformed Presbyterian Church, Evangelical Synod, which had itself come about due to a merger between the Evangelical Presbyterian Church (formerly the Bible Presbyterian Church – Columbus Synod and not the current denomination of the same name) and the Reformed Presbyterian Church, General Synod (a group of "New Light" Covenanters). The RPCES brought to the PCA a more broadly national base of membership with a denominational college, Covenant College, and a seminary, Covenant Theological Seminary. Previously, the PCA had relied on independent evangelical institutions such as Reformed Theological Seminary in Jackson, Mississippi and Westminster Theological Seminary in Philadelphia, Pennsylvania.

The PCA had originally invited three denominations to the merger, including the Orthodox Presbyterian Church (OPC) and the Reformed Presbyterian Church of North America (RPCNA). The OPC voted to accept the invitation to join the PCA, but the PCA voted against receiving them. The PCA presbyteries did not approve the application by the required three-quarters majority, and so the proposed invitation process was terminated without the OPC presbyteries voting on the issue. The RPCES was the only church to carry through with the merger. The merger was called "Joining and Receiving". When a sufficient number of RPCES and PCA presbyteries voted in favor of the plan, the final votes occurred at the respective annual meetings, both held in Grand Rapids, Michigan: the RPCES Synod voted to join the PCA on June 12, 1982, and the PCA General Assembly voted to receive the RPCES on June 14. The Reformed Presbyterian Church, Evangelical Synod agencies and committees were united with their PCA counterparts. The history and historical documents of the RPCES were incorporated into the PCA. Graduates from Covenant College and Seminary were also officially recognized. The move reflected a rare phenomenon in American Protestantism of two conservative denominations merging, an occurrence that was far more common among mainline, moderate-to-liberal bodies in the 20th century (such as the UPCUSA/PCUS reunion). In 1982 the RPCES had 25,718 communicant members in 187 congregations served by 400 pastors. The PCA had 519 churches, 91,060 communicant members, and 480 pastors. After the merger the PCA membership was 706 churches, 116,788 communicant members, and 1,276 teaching elders.

In 1986 the PCA again invited the Orthodox Presbyterian Church to join them, but without success. Not everyone agreed with the decision. In the four years after 1986, there was a voluntary realignment as congregations left the OPC for the PCA, mainly from California, Montana and Pennsylvania, but also from as far as Alaska. By the 1970s, the OPC had grown a new ‘pietist/revivalist’ wing under the influence of Jack Miller. According to Tim Keller, the New Life Churches and their Sonship course represented classic revivalism, and it did not fit well with the more doctrinalist cast of the OPC. The New Life Churches were made to feel unwelcome and nearly all left in the early 1990s to swell the pietist ranks of the PCA.

==== Nationwide growth ====
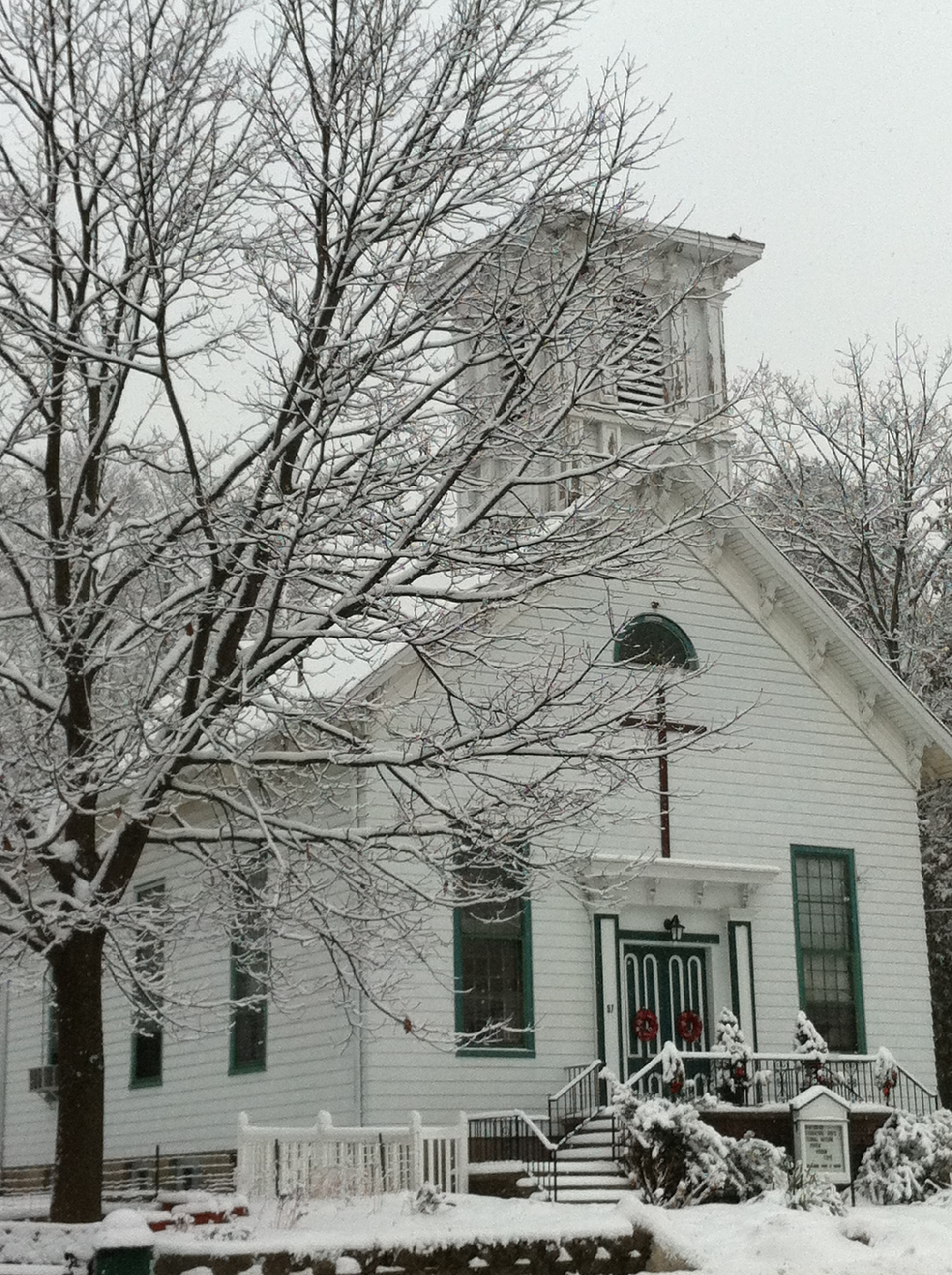
The Monsey Church, founded 1824, left the Christian Reformed Church in North America for the PCA in 2005.

In 1983 several PCUS churches had joined the PCA, instead of merging with the UPCUSA into the current PC (U.S.A.); others joined the recently formed Evangelical Presbyterian Church, unrelated to the 1950s and 1960s body of that name. A clause in the Plan of Union between the two mainline bodies allowed dissenting PCUS congregations to refrain from joining the merger and to join a denomination of their choosing.

The PCA Historical Center, a repository of archives and manuscripts, is located in St. Louis, Missouri.

In 2004 the former PC(USA) member First Presbyterian Church in Charleston, MS voted to join the PCA rather than the EPC, which allows women as church officers. Hospers Presbyterian Church in Hospers, Iowa, was also PC(USA), joined the PCA in November 2006. Park Cities Presbyterian Church was formed when about 1,500–2,000 former Highland Park Presbyterian Church (Dallas, Texas) members separated from the PC(USA) and joined PCA. In 2013 and 2014 a few conservative PC(USA) congregations from New York State and from the Presbytery of Sheppards & Lapsley (Unity Presbyterian in Weogufka, Alabama, and Southwood Presbyterian in Talladega, Alabama) in the state of Alabama and Smyrna Korean Presbyterian Church in Enterprise, Alabama, joined the Presbyterian Church in America instead of ECO or EPC, which have women ministers. Several PC(USA) breakaway groups like New Covenant Presbyterian Church in McComb, Mississippi, which broke from J.J. White Memorial Presbyterian Church in 2007, and First Scot's Presbyterian Church, PCA in Beaufort, South Carolina (formerly First Scots Independent Presbyterian Church), voted to affiliate with the PCA. As well as several independent Anglo and till now unaffiliated Korean Presbyterian churches like Greater Springfield Korean Church in Agawam, Massachusetts. According to PC(USA) statistics, seven PC(USA) congregations with 550 members have joined the PCA since 2005, not counting breakaway groups.

Doctrinal debate in the Reformed Church in America led some RCA congregations like Grace Reformed Church in Lansing, Illinois, the Peace Community Church from Frankfort, Illinois, Crete Reformed Church in Crete, Illinois, First Reformed Church in Lansing, Illinois, Missio Dei Church in New Lenox, Illinois and University Reformed Church in East Lansing, Michigan to join the PCA as a conservative alternative.

Each of the churches was allowed to withdraw with their respective properties and assets after paying a varying settlement fee to the Illiana-Florida Classis. But if a church should withdraw from the PCA within five years of the approval of the agreement, then the property is to revert to the Classis of Illiana-Florida. University Reformed Church was also granted dismissal by the RCA Classis on March 21, 2015.

Kevin DeYoung, the pastor of University Reformed Church, summarized the reasons of withdrawing from the Reformed Church in America and affiliate with the PCA:

Let me simply say at this point that our reason for seeking to leave the RCA is not one thing, but many things. From the adoption of the Belhar Confession, to the removal of the conscience clauses related to women’s ordination, to the growing acceptance of homosexual practice in the denomination, we believe the RCA has changed significantly in the last several years. The denomination has moved away from churches like ours. Our request is that we may be able to move too.

== Doctrine and practice ==
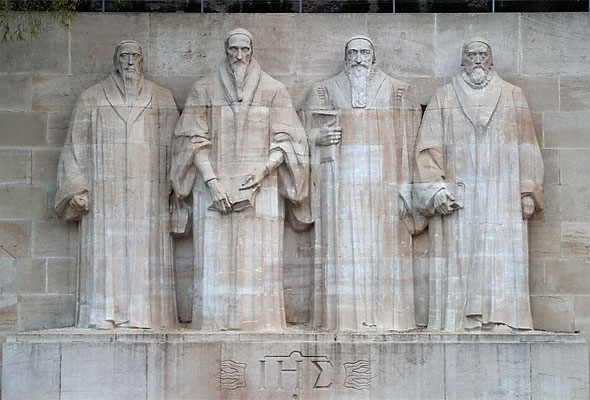
The Reformation Wall in Geneva, Switzerland with statues to William Farel, John Calvin, Theodore Beza, and John Knox, the founders of the Reformed theological tradition to which the PCA subscribes

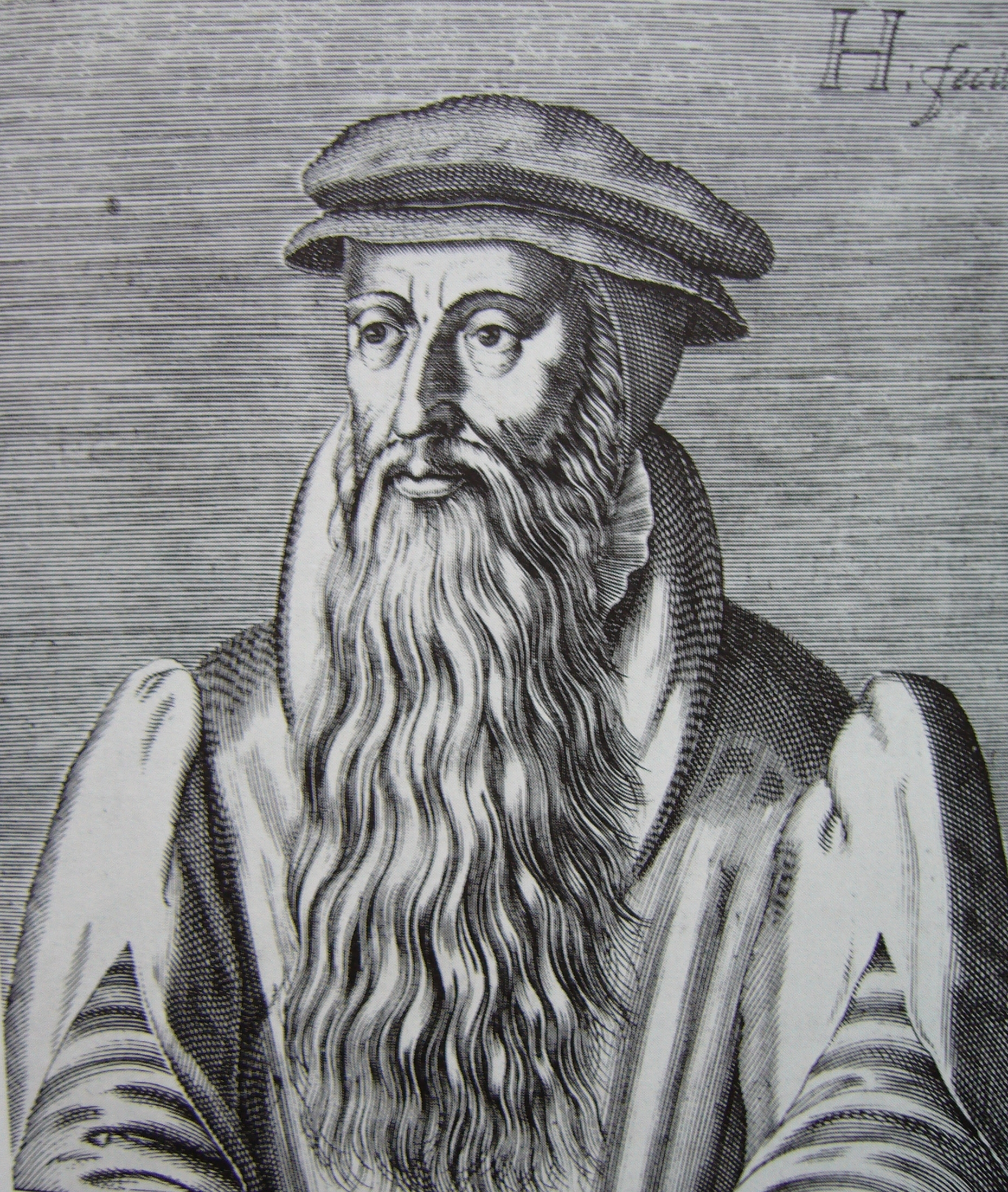
John Knox, the "father" of Presbyterianism

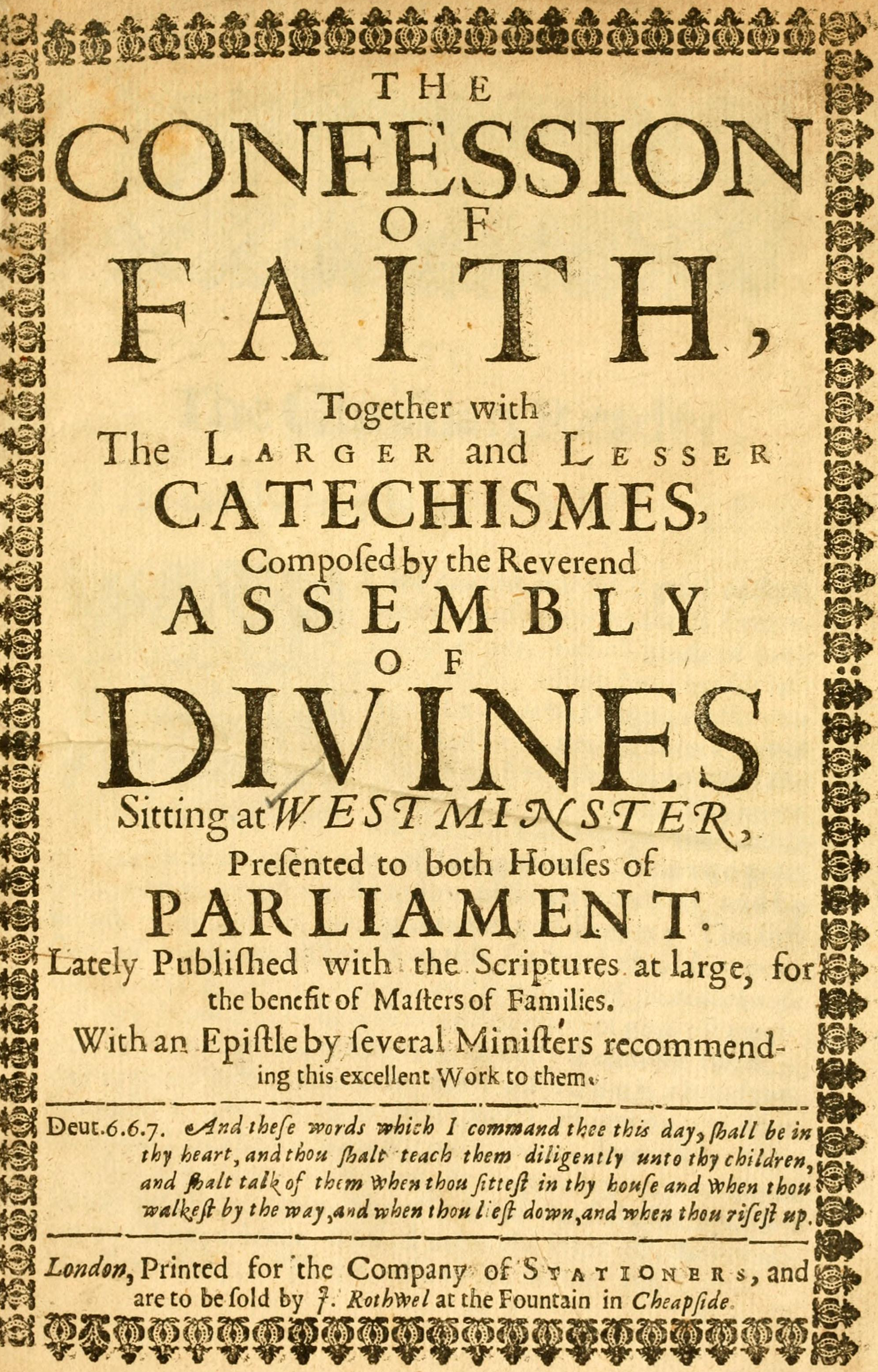
The title page of the 1658 printing of the Westminster Standards, the confessional standard of the PCA

The PCA includes representation from all the historic Calvinist branches of Presbyterianism. The PCA's founding churches came out of the Southern Presbyterian church, which included revivalists, Old Siders, classic ‘Princeton’ Old Schoolers, conservative New Schoolers, and others. In 1982, the PCA merged with the Reformed Presbyterian Church, Evangelical Synod, which itself was the product of a union between the ‘New Light’ (New Side) Reformed Presbyterian Church, General Synod, and parts of the Bible Presbyterian church (the pietistic New School). In addition, many evangelical congregations that had lived within the mainline Presbyterian churches, both north and south, left as individual churches and joined the PCA. In short, the PCA has been formed with churches and leaders from many different branches—Old School, Old Side, New School.

A Synopsis of the Beliefs of the Presbyterian Church in America

- The Bible is the inspired and inerrant Word of God, the only infallible rule of faith and practice.
- There is one God, eternal and self-existing in three persons (Father, Son and Holy Spirit) who are to be equally loved, honored, and adored.
- All mankind participated in Adam's fall from his original sinless state and is thus lost in sin and totally helpless.
- The Sovereign God, for no other reason than His own unfathomable love and mercy, has chosen lost sinners from every nation to be redeemed by the quickening power of the Holy Spirit and through the atoning death and resurrection of His son, Jesus Christ.
- Those sinners whom the Spirit quickens, come to believe in Christ as Savior by the Word of God, are born again, become sons of God, and will persevere to the end.
- Justification is by faith and through it the undeserving sinner is clothed with the righteousness of Christ.
- The goal of God's salvation in the life of the Christian is holiness, good works, and service for the glory of God.
- At death the Christian's soul passes immediately into the presence of God and the unbeliever's soul is eternally separated from God unto condemnation.
- Baptism is a sign of God's covenant and is properly administered to children of believers in their infancy as well as to those who come as adults to trust in Christ.
- Jesus Christ will return to earth, visibly and bodily, at a time when He is not expected, to consummate history and the eternal plan of God.
- The Gospel of God's salvation in Jesus Christ must be published to all the world as a witness before Jesus Christ returns.

=== Confessions ===
The Presbyterian Church in America motto is "Faithful to the Scriptures, True to the Reformed faith, Obedient to the great commission of Jesus Christ." The PCA professes adherence to the historic confessional standards of Presbyterianism: the Westminster Confession of Faith, the Westminster Shorter Catechism, and the Westminster Larger Catechism. These secondary documents are viewed as subordinate to the Bible, which alone is viewed as the inspired Word of God.

=== Education and ministries ===
As might be expected given Presbyterianism's historically high esteem for education, the PCA has generally valued academic exploration more highly than revivalist traditions of evangelicalism. Apologetics in general and presuppositional apologetics has been a defining feature with many of its theologians and higher-ranking clergy, and many also practice "cultural apologetics" by engaging with and participating in secular cultural activities such as film, music, literature, and art to win them for Christ.

Additionally, the PCA emphasizes ministries of mercy such as outreach to the poor, the elderly, orphans, Native Americans, people with physical and mental disabilities, refugees, etc. As a result, the denomination has held several national conferences to help equip members to participate in this type of work, and several PCA affiliates such as Desire Street Ministries, New City Fellowship, and New Song Fellowship have received national attention for their service to the community at large.

=== Life issues ===
The PCA is anti-abortion and opposes euthanasia, according to the official statement adopted at the 16th General Assembly in 1988: "Euthanasia, or "mercy-killing" of a patient by a physician or by anyone else, including the patient himself (suicide) is murder. To withhold or to withdraw medical treatment, as is being discussed here, does not constitute euthanasia and should not be placed into the same category with it."

=== Marriage ===
The PCA is against divorce, except in cases of adultery or abandonment (desertion).

The PCA takes the following position on homosexuality: "Homosexual practice is sin. The Bible teaches that all particular sins flow from our rebellious disposition of heart. Just as with any other sin, the PCA deals with people in a pastoral way, seeking to transform their lifestyle through the power of the gospel as applied by the Holy Spirit. Hence, in condemning homosexual practice we claim no self-righteousness, but recognize that any and all sin is equally heinous in the sight of a holy God." The PCA officially opposes same-sex marriage. Roy Taylor, Stated Clerk of the General Assembly of the PCA, has said that the PCA "believes that, from creation, God ordained the marriage covenant to be a bond between one man and one woman" and that "divinely sanctioned standard for sexual activity is fidelity within a marriage between one man and one woman or chastity outside of such a marriage. Throughout history, there has often been a conflict between the unchanging standards of biblical ethics that the Church seeks to maintain and the changing social practices of the culture." In 2020, the PCA's Committee Report on Human Sexuality concluded that it is generally unwise for Christians to identify themselves as gay Christian even if they abstain from homosexual activities due to homoerotic desires being sinful in nature. Furthermore, the PCA officially affirmed the Nashville Statement at their annual General Assembly in 2019.

However, the denomination has had mixed statements concerning the ordination of celibate or non-practicing gay men. A 1977 statement of the General Assembly had restricted from ministry only "practicing homosexuals"—as opposed to non-practicing. That precedent has since been called into question. Between 2018 and 2021, denominational conservatives lobbied for a series of investigations and a judicial case against celibate PCA pastor Greg Johnson on account of his 2019 admission in Christianity Today that, as a gay atheist who converted to Christianity in college, his sexual orientation had nevertheless never changed. Critics sought Johnson's removal for identifying as a gay or same-sex attracted man and for arguing against sexual orientation change efforts as ineffective. Johnson requested investigation by his regional presbytery, which exonerated him in 2019 and again in 2020. In 2020, Johnson's exoneration was appealed to the denomination's Standing Judicial Commission. On October 22, 2021, that denominational court ruled in Johnson's favor by a vote of 16 to 7. While Johnson has stated that he has never been sexually active, significant opposition to Johnson's openness about his sexual orientation led the denomination's General Assembly in 2021 to propose changes to its constitution to prevent other celibate nonstraight people from ordination to ministry in the PCA. Those proposals failed to win the required two-thirds of presbyteries. In November 2022, Johnson's congregation, Memorial Presbyterian Church in St. Louis, voted to withdraw from the PCA, citing continued attacks from within the denomination, and Johnson left with it.

In 2014, in response to media confusion between the PCA and the PCUSA, the stated clerk's office issued the following:

There are several Presbyterian denominations in America. Sometimes people mistakenly attribute the views or actions of one Presbyterian denomination to another. The "Presbyterian Church in America" (PCA) is an evangelical denomination in the Reformed theological tradition. The PCA, like other Evangelical, Conservative, Orthodox, and Traditional Christians from many denominations, believes that, from creation, God ordained the marriage covenant to be a bond between one man and one woman, and that understanding is what the Church has always believed, taught, and confessed. Therefore, we believe that the divinely sanctioned standard for sexual activity is fidelity within a marriage between one man and one woman or chastity outside of such a marriage. Throughout history, there has often been a conflict between the unchanging standards of biblical ethics that the Church seeks to maintain and the changing social practices of the culture. The Presbyterian Church in America (PCA) has not redefined marriage nor does it intend to do so.

— L. Roy Taylor, Stated Clerk, General Assembly of the Presbyterian Church in America

=== Social and theological differences with the Presbyterian Church (USA) ===
Topic	Presbyterian Church in America (PCA)	Presbyterian Church USA (PC(USA))
Doctrinal Standards	The PCA affirms primary the Bible and the Westminster Confession of Faith, Westminster Shorter Catechism and Westminster Larger Catechism and the Book of Church Order. All church officers must subscribe to these documents as their Confession of Faith. Teaching against the doctrines contained in these documents or violating them could result in trial and deposition from office.	The PC(USA) affirms the Bible and the Book of Confessions, which includes the Nicene Creed, the Apostles' Creed, the Scots Confession, the Heidelberg Catechism, the Second Helvetic Confession, the Westminster Confession of Faith, the Shorter Catechism, the Larger Catechism, the Theological Declaration of Barmen, the Confession of 1967, A Brief Statement of Faith, and the Confession of Belhar.
Theology	Conservative, Calvinistic, and Covenantal, but Reformed orthodoxy can vary from presbytery to presbytery, and even individual churches can be differ, some are orthodox Reformed and some more broadly Evangelical, but all of them must subscribe to the Westminster Confession of Faith and the Book of Church Order of the PCA	Mainline, between moderate to progressive. Evangelical wing is also present.
Affiliated Seminaries	One official Theological Seminary, the Covenant Theological Seminary in St. Louis, Missouri. Many candidates for ordained pastoral ministry are drawn from Reformed Theological Seminary, Westminster Theological Seminary, Westminster Seminary California, Greenville Presbyterian Theological Seminary, and Gordon-Conwell Theological Seminary.	Official Seminaries are Austin Presbyterian Theological Seminary, Columbia Theological Seminary, Johnson C. Smith Theological Seminary at the Interdenominational Theological Center, Louisville Presbyterian Theological Seminary, McCormick Theological Seminary, Pittsburgh Theological Seminary, Princeton Theological Seminary, San Francisco Theological Seminary (disputed), Union Presbyterian Seminary in Richmond, Virginia and Charlotte, North Carolina, and University of Dubuque Theological Seminary.
Ordination	Only ordains men in "obedience to the New Testament standard for those who rule the church and teach doctrine." Ministers, ruling elders, and deacons in the PCA are men only, in obedience to the New Testament standard for those who rule the church and teach doctrine, though women have a wide range of use for their gifts in our churches"	Both straight or practicing gay men and women are ordained pastors or elders.
Inerrancy	Scripture is inerrant and infallible in all that it teaches. Creationism is the doctrine held and confessed by most PCA pastors.	Inerrancy is generally not accepted. Generally follow Barthian view of Scripture. That is, even though the Bible is fallible, the Scripture either can contain God's word or can become God's word by personal investigation or application. Therefore, higher criticism of text is considered a valuable tool. In the PCUSA, evolution is widely believed in.
Church property	Church property belongs to the local congregation without any right of reversion whatsoever to any Presbytery or General Assembly, all giving to the administration and permanent committees of the PCA is voluntary	Church property is held in trust by the Presbytery for the benefit of the denomination.
Abortion	"Abortion would terminate the life of an individual, a bearer of God's image, who is being divinely formed and prepared for a God-given role in the world." The 14th General Assembly of the Presbyterian Church in America, reaffirms our church's pro-life and anti-abortion stand, and that we communicate our position to the President of the United States, the Supreme Court, and the United States Congress; further, that we encourage our pastors and sessions to emphasize this position of our church in the congregations and communities in which they serve.	Morally "acceptable" though it "ought to be an option of last resort." All abortions imply some sort of tragedy.
Homosexuality	Homosexual practice is sin. PCA believes that God's intent in creation was that male and female would be complementary, that the privilege of sexual expression would be between male and female only, and this expression would be only in the context of marriage. Both heterosexual and homosexual sexual behavior outside of marriage violates the human spirit and distorts God's intent for men and women. In light of the biblical view of its sinfulness, a practicing homosexual continuing in this sin would not be a fit candidate for ordination or membership in the Presbyterian Church in America. The PCA also affirmed an overture (proposal) during their 2021 General Assembly that "Prohibits Ordination for Men Who Self-Identify as ‘Gay Christians,’ ‘Same-sex Attracted Christians,’ ‘Homosexual Christians,’or Like Terms”. However, this proposal failed to receive the support of 2/3 of presbyeries, and therefore did not proceed.	There is a great diversity of opinion regarding homosexuality in the PCUSA. In 2010, the General Assembly expressed that "The PCUSA has no consensus in the interpretation of Scripture on issues of same-sex practice." Homosexuals are welcome as members. In 2014, the General Assembly amended the Book of Order to redefine marriage as between "two people" rather than between a man and a woman and allows ministers to perform any legal marriage between two people. Ministers or congregations who object to same-sex marriage will not be required to perform such ceremonies in states where such marriages are legal. The change was ratified by a majority of presbyteries on March 18, 2015. LGBTQIA+ individuals may be ordained to all offices of the church.
Divorce	The PCA teaches that divorce is a sin except in cases of adultery or desertion	In 1952 the PCUSA General Assembly moved to amend sections of the Westminster Confession, eliminating "innocent parties" language, broadening the grounds to include no-fault divorce. Divorce is regrettable and not to be done lightly.
Worship	The PCA believes that all of the worship should be directed only by the Bible Both traditional and contemporary forms of worship are practiced as long as they conform to the Scripture.	The PCUSA states that worship should be "traditional", in that it has a grounding in the Bible and the practices of the ancient church, "contemporary", in that it addresses societal concerns and "blended", in that it incorporates customs, culture and tradition from a variety of sources. Congregations have considerable freedom to worship in ways meaningful to them.

=== Comparison to other Presbyterian denominations ===
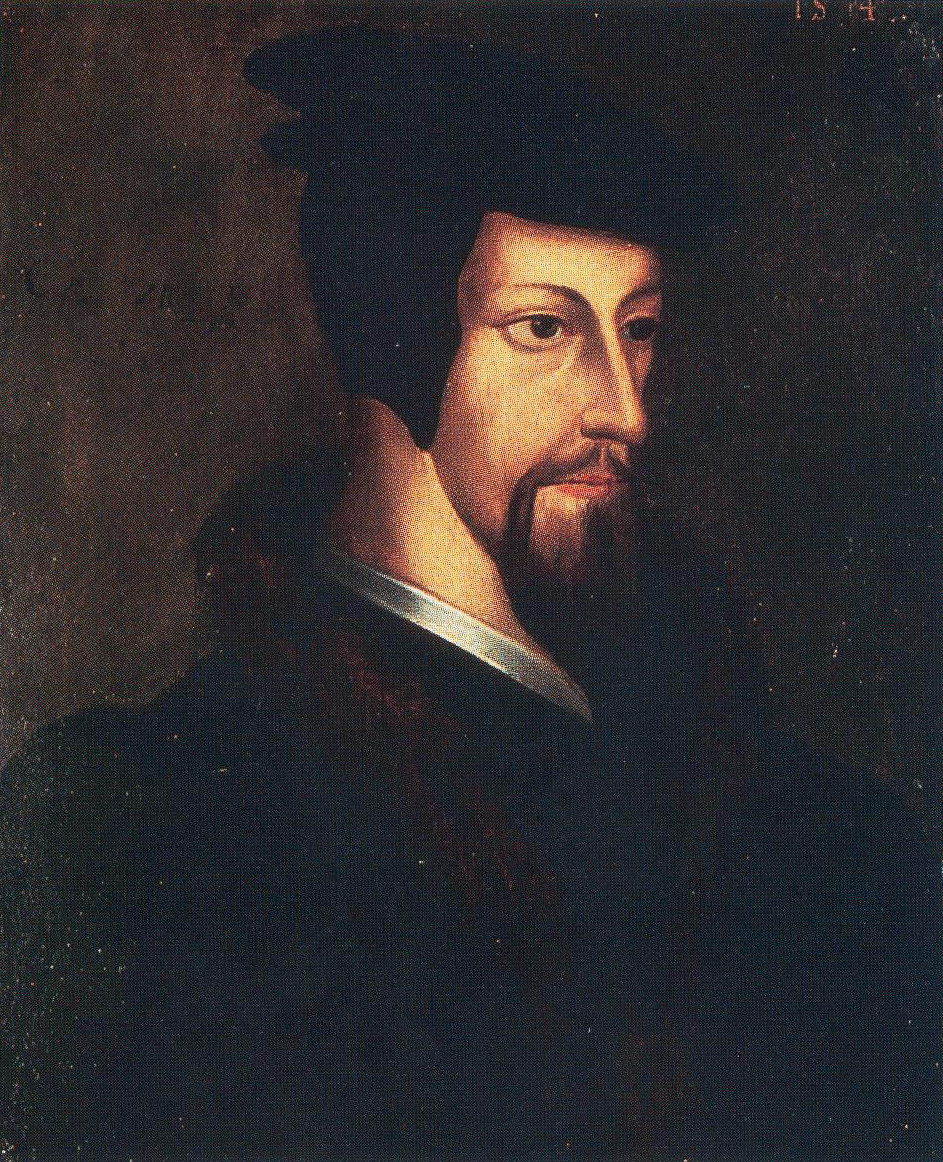
John Calvin, the founder of the Reformed family of Protestantism

The PCA is more socially and theologically conservative than the PC(USA). The PCA requires ordained pastors and elders to subscribe to the theological doctrines detailed in the Westminster Standards, with only minor exceptions allowed, while the PC(USA)'s Book of Confessions allows much more leeway. The PCA ordains only men who profess traditional marriage, while the PC(USA) allows the ordination of both women and (in certain Presbyteries) non-celibate gays and lesbians as clergy. Like the PC(USA), however, the PCA accommodates different views of creation. The PCA strives for racial reconciliation. The PCA is unilaterally anti-abortion, believing life begins at conception. Unlike the PC(USA), the PCA has no ecumenical relationship with organizations which accept denominations that they perceive to have strayed from orthodoxy, such as the World Council of Churches or World Communion of Reformed Churches. Due to problems related to church property when splitting from the PC(USA), in the PCA all church buildings belong to the local church, which gives the PCA a slightly more congregational church structure than most other Presbyterian structures.

The PCA is generally less theologically conservative than the Orthodox Presbyterian Church (OPC, founded in 1936), but more conservative than the Evangelical Presbyterian Church (EPC, founded in 1981) and the Covenant Order of Evangelical Presbyterians (ECO, founded in 2012), though the differences can vary from presbytery to presbytery and even congregation to congregation. The PCA, as mentioned above, will not ordain women as teaching elders (pastors), ruling elders, or deacons, while the EPC considers this issue a "non-essential" matter left to the individual ordaining body, and ECO fully embraces women's ordination. However, there is an increasingly strong movement in the PCA to allow ordination of women as deacons including overtures in the General Assembly. A number of PCA churches are known to have non-ordained women deacons and deaconesses. The EPC is also more tolerant of the charismatic movement than the PCA. However, there is a strong New Calvinist movement in the PCA that practices contemporary music, adheres to a continuationist position on the gifts of the Holy Spirit, and engages in civil dialogue with differing theological views. This is not surprising since PCA has issued, from its inception, a pastoral letter to all the PCA churches to tolerate the charismatics within its ranks.

The PCA has little doctrinal quarrel with the OPC. Both denominations have similar views on the Federal Vision, creation and justification. While most OPC congregations allow women only to teach children and other women in Sunday school, some moderate PCA congregations allow women to do anything a non-ordained man can do. While the OPC and the PCA both adhere to the Westminster Standards, the OPC is generally more strict in requiring its officers to subscribe to those standards without exception. It is hard to find any doctrinal differences between these two denominations. In recent years the OPC and PCA published substantial similar reports on the Creation Days, the debate about Justification and the issue of the Federal Vision. They have identical positions on social issues like women in combat, Freemasonry and abortion. The only divergence of any significance is the matter of charismatic gifts. The OPC maintains a strict cessationist position, while the PCA allows presbyteries to ordain non-cessationists if they do not believe that ongoing gifts are on par with Special Revelation. Many PCA churches have moved toward contemporary worship, while the OPC is dominated by traditional Reformed worship. The southern roots of the Presbyterian Church in America were tempered somewhat by the merger with the Reformed Presbyterian Church, Evangelical Synod and the northern roots of the OPC was also tempered by the influence of Van Til and Kuyper. Nonetheless, the two denominations enjoy fraternal relations and cooperate in a number of ways, such as sharing control of a publication company, Great Commission Publications, which produces Sunday School curricula for both denominations.

== Church government ==
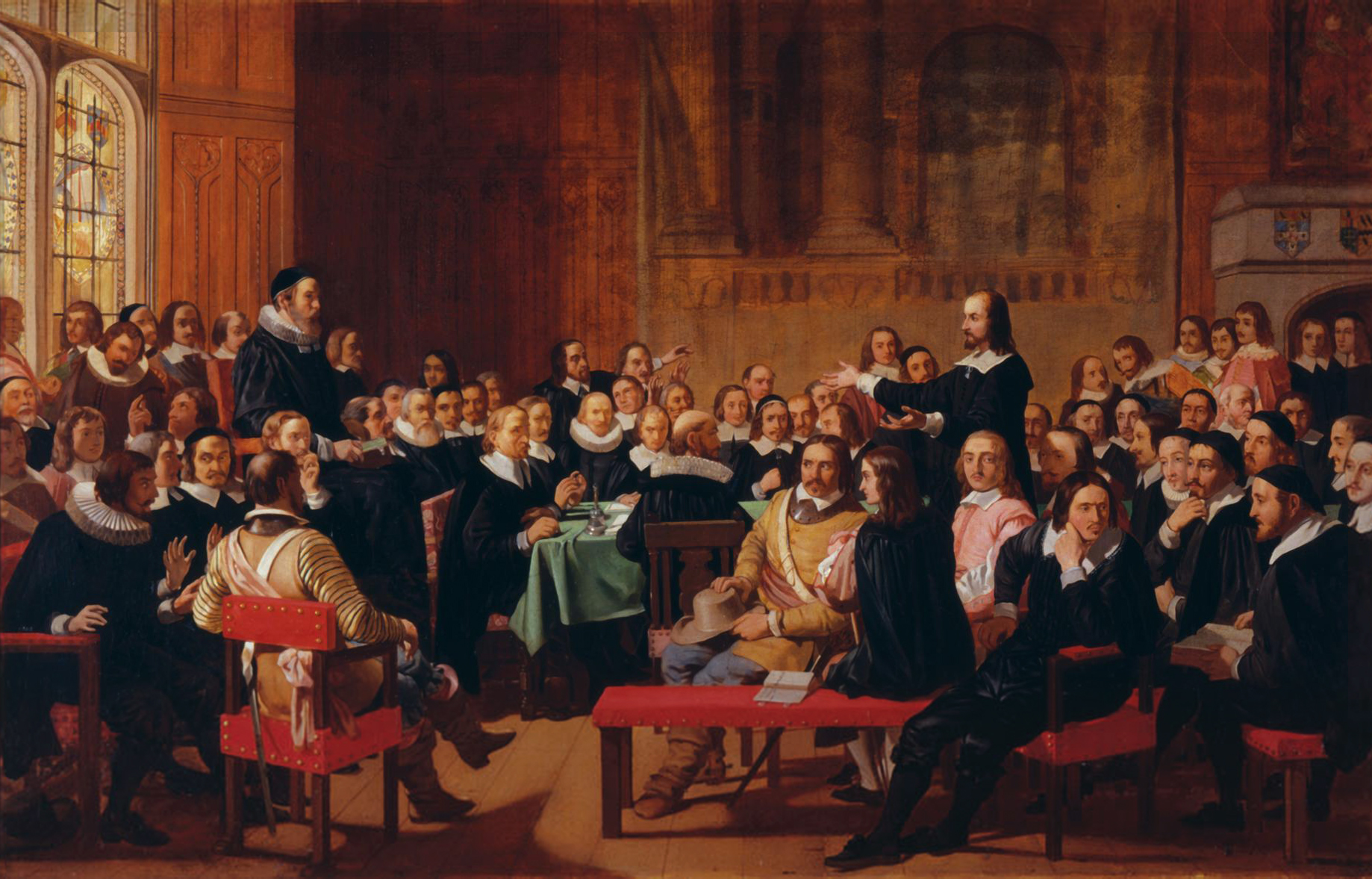
Herbert, John Rogers, RA (c. 1844), The Assertion of Liberty of Conscience by the Independents at the Westminster Assembly of Divines (painting)

The PCA maintains the presbyterian church government set forth in its Book of Church Order. Local church officers include teaching elders, ruling elders and deacons. The BCO is based on the PCUS Book of Church Order, which was declared in force on May 19, 1879. The distinction between pastors and elders in the PCA is a mixture of two traditions. The PCA holds to a quasi-parity of pastors and elders (named Ruling and Teaching Elders; REs and TEs for short), where Ruling and Teaching Elders have the same voting rights in the courts of the church and can participate in each other's examinations and ordinations, yet there are certain and definite ways that TEs and REs are distinct. Pastors have deference as moderators of local church Sessions. Only Pastors may administer the sacraments and ordinarily only pastors may preach (REs must be licensed by a presbytery if they wish to preach regularly). Also, REs are members of their local churches, while pastors are members of their presbyteries and not members of the local churches they serve. While this 2.5 office view is the consensus of the PCA, many would hold to a more Northern three-office view and others would hold to a more Southern two-office view. Church government is exercised at three levels: the Session, which governs the local church; the Presbytery, a regional governing body, and the General Assembly, the highest court of the denomination. The PCA is committed to a principle of voluntary association and all PCA congregations own their own property. Additionally all giving to the administration and permanent committees of the PCA is voluntary. The PCA does not have Synods, which some other groups have either as the highest court or as an intermediate court between presbyteries and the general assembly.

== Statistics ==
Denominational statistics
Year	Members	Churches (& missions)	Ministers	Moderator
1973	41,232	260	196	RE W. Jack Williamson
1974	55,206			TE Erskine L. Jackson
1975	67,345	394	397	RE Leon F. Hendrick
1976	68,993	405	457	TE William A. MacIlwaine
1977	73,899	428	531	RE John T. Clark
1978	82,095	440	584	TE G. Aiken Taylor
1979	86,885	460	668	RE William F. Joseph Jr.
1980	90,991	487	728	TE Paul G. Settle
1981	136,582	698	1,264	RE Kenneth L. Ryskamp
1982	149,548	797	1,415	TE R. Laird Harris
1983	155,988	825	1,451	RE L.A. Austin III
1984	168,239	843	1,562	TE James M. Baird Jr.
1985	177,917	878	1,639	RE Richard C. Chewning
1986	188,083	913	1,702	TE Frank M. Barker Jr.
1987	190,960	924	1,722	RE Gerald Sovereign
1988	208,394	1,067	1,905	TE D. James Kennedy
1989	217,374	1,000	1,949	RE John B. White Jr.
1990	223,935	1,167	2,073	TE Cortez A. Cooper Jr.
1991	233,770	–	–	RE Mark Belz
1992	239,500	1,212	2,217	TE W. Wilson Benton Jr.
1993	250,551			RE G. Richard Hostetter
1994	257,556	1,167	2,397	TE William S. Barker II
1995	267,764	1,299	2,476	RE Frank A. Brock
1996	277,899			TE Charles A. McGowan
1997	279,549	1,340	2,665	RE Samuel J. Duncan
1998	289,906			TE Kennedy Smart
1999	299,055	1,206	2,873	RE Thomas F. Leopard
2000	306,156	1,458	2,980	TE Morton H. Smith
2001	306,784	1,498	3,082	RE Steve Fox
2002	310,750	1,499	3,181	TE Joseph F. Ryan
2003	325,791	1,534	3,287	RE Joel Belz
2004	330,182			TE Ligon Duncan
2005	331,126			RE Howard Q. Davis
2006	334,151	1,621	3,430	TE Dominic A. Aquila
2007	340,736	1,645	3,508	RE E.J. Nusbaum
2008	335,850	1,672	3,562	TE Paul Kooistra
2009	341,210	1,719	3,645	RE Bradford Bradley
2010	341,482	1,737	3,760	TE Harry Reeder
2011	351,406	1,771	4,256	RE Daniel Carrell
2012	356,820	1,777	4,321	TE Michael Ross
2013	359,834	1,808	4,416	RE Bruce Terrell
2014	358,516	1,831	4,556	TE Bryan Chapell
2015	370,332	1,861	4,630	RE Jim Wert
2016	374,161	1,892	4,761	TE George Robertson
2017	374,736	1,912	4,882	RE Alexander Jun
2018	384,793	1,927	4,951	TE Irwyn Ince
2019	383,721	1,915	5,057	RE Howie Donahoe
2020	383,338	1,928	5,117	None
2021	378,389	1,911	5,159	TE Roy Taylor
2022	386,345	1,932	5,247	RE John Bise
2023	393,528	1,934	5,285	TE Fred Greco
2024	400,751	1,964	5,347	RE Steve Dowling
2025	405,634	1,959	5,388	TE Kevin DeYoung

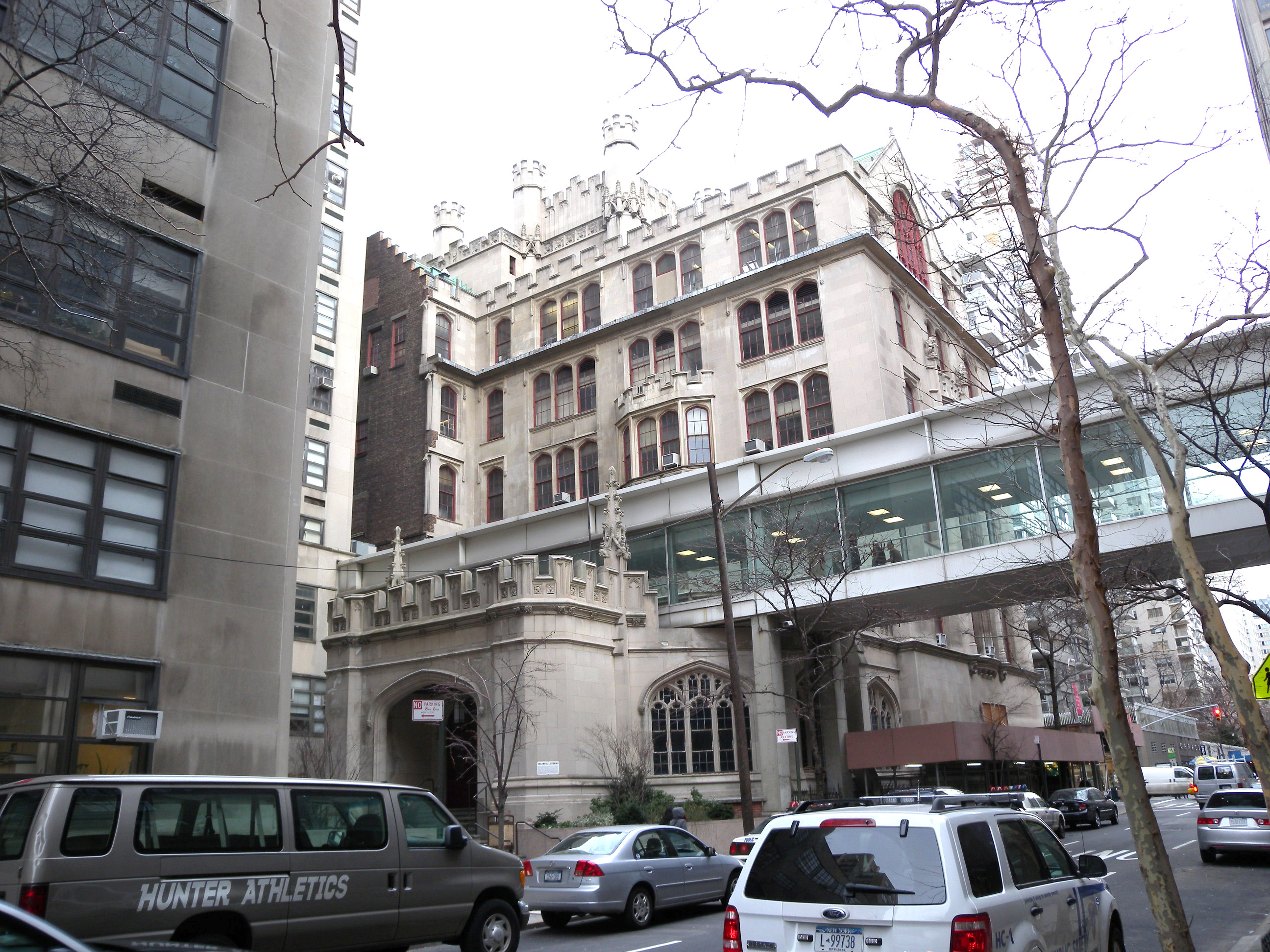
Hunter College, one of three meeting places for Redeemer Presbyterian Church (New York City), founded by Tim Keller, with more than 5,000 weekly attenders of which the largest group is Asian-American

=== Membership trends ===
In 1995, the PCA was described as one of the fastest-growing denominations in the United States, having experienced steady growth since its founding in 1973. In 2009, the PCA reported "a net loss in members for the first time." In 2016, the denomination reported growth over a five-year period. From 2017 to 2021, the PCA reported having 374,736 in 2017, 384,793 in 2018, 383,721 in 2019, 383,721 in 2020, and 378,389 in 2021.

As of December 31, 2011, the Presbyterian Church in America had 1,771 churches (includes established churches and new church plants) representing all 50 U.S. states, the District of Columbia, Puerto Rico and 5 Canadian provinces. There were 351,406 communicant and non-communicant members. As of 2022, the PCA had 88 presbyteries. In 2012 the PCA had 1,777 congregations – 1,474 particular and 303 mission churches – that means a net increase of 6, membership developed by 12,613 total of 364,019. The number of ordained PCA ministers are 4,321.

Less than 50% of the PCA churches send statistical report, and the stated supply believes the membership of the PCA experienced modest growth.

The PCA is one of the most diverse Protestant denominations in the US with about 20% non-white members.

More than 250 churches of the denomination are ethnic Korean churches with 9 non-geographical Korean language presbyteries, which is about 15% of the total.

The PCA has grown tenfold in thirty years. This was partly the result of the union with the Reformed Presbyterian Church, Evangelical Synod and the voluntary realignment of some Orthodox Presbyterian Churches. For example, in Georgia the PCA has 14 congregations and 2,784 member in 1973, but in 2006 there were 93 congregations and 22,000 members. In 2015 there were about 150 congregations. This is more than tenfold growth of the denomination in the Peach State.

The PCA is among the top 5 denominations that are most aggressive in church planting in North America.

=== Adherents and population penetration ===
The greatest concentration is in the states of the Deep South, with more scattered strength in the Upper South, the upper Ohio Valley, and the Southwest. Two-thirds of PCA churches and members are found in the Southeast, and 25 churches are in the Metro Atlanta area.

The state of Florida has the most PCA churches with more than 160 congregations, but Alabama, South Carolina and North Carolina, Mississippi, Georgia, Tennessee, and Texas in the South and Pennsylvania, Maryland and Virginia on the East Coast remain strongholds for the denomination. In the five southeastern US States (Mississippi, Alabama, South Carolina, Florida, and Georgia) the PCA had 742 congregations, making up more than one third of the total 1,771 churches. Mississippi has the highest percentage of adherents per 1,000 people, followed by Alabama, South Carolina, Tennessee, Delaware, and Georgia. Numerous mega churches can be found in the American South and East as well as in Illinois. The largest PCA church is a Korean church located in Centreville, Virginia called Korean Central Presbyterian Church and the second largest, called Sarang Community Church of Southern California in Anaheim, California.

==== In Canada ====
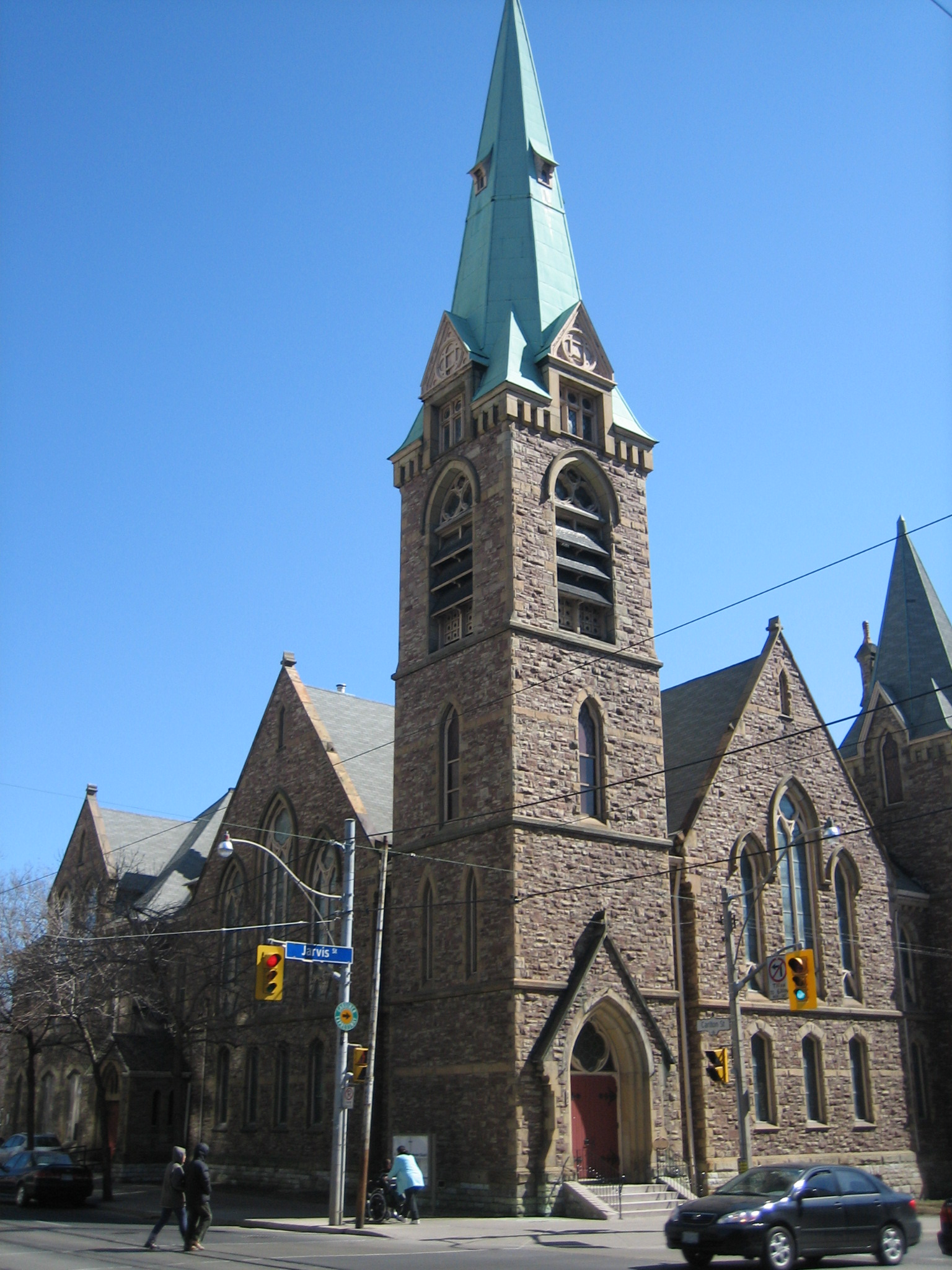
Grace Toronto PCA owns the historic St. Andrews Church.

When the Reformed Presbyterian Church, Evangelical Synod merged with the PCA, Canadian congregations entered the union. Since the merger, other congregations have been added through evangelism. Canadian churches report that "secularism and unbelief provide an opportunity to evangelism". There are more than 22 congregations in Ontario, British Columbia, Alberta, New Brunswick and Nova Scotia.

==== Outside North America ====
The PCA has a presbytery in Chile with more than five congregations and missions.

The Potomac Presbytery proposed to elect a provisional presbytery in the Latin American country of Paraguay with 4–5 congregations and church plants in Asunción and the nearby cities. The Presbytery worked in the country for 15–20 years. The goal is to establish a National Presbyterian Church in Paraguay.

=== Demographics ===
==== Korean churches ====
The membership of the PCA is predominantly Caucasian (80%), but the denomination includes more than 260 Korean-American Churches in 9 Korean Presbyteries. The first Korean Presbytery was formed in 1982; since then the number of presbyteries has grown to 9, namely the Korean Capital Presbytery, the Korean Central Presbytery, the Korean Eastern Presbytery, the Korean Northeastern Presbytery, the Korean Northwest Presbytery, the Korean Southeastern Presbytery, the Korean Southern Presbytery and the Korean Southwest Presbytery, and the recently formed Korean Southwest Orange County Presbytery.

Korean PCA churches have contributed significantly to the denominational leadership and the church at large. In 2013, Michael Oh was appointed CEO of Lausanne Committee for World Evangelization. In 2014, Lloyd Kim was appointed coordinator of Mission to the World. In 2017, PCA elected its first non-Anglo moderator, Alexander Jun. The same year, Joel Kim was appointed as president of Westminster Seminary California. In 2019, Walter Kim was elected president of National Association of Evangelicals and in 2020, Julius Kim was selected as president of The Gospel Coalition.

Koreans comprise approximately 15% of the denomination, and the majority of them are located in the West coast and Northeast regions. In recent years several independent Korean congregations have joined the PCA to be a part of a conservative Presbyterian denomination. The largest PCA church is a Korean church located in Centreville, Virginia called Korean Central Presbyterian Church and the second largest, called Sarang Community Church of Southern California in Anaheim, California. Many Korean churches in the PCA appoint non-ordained deaconesses and women encouragers (Kwonsa) who are elected and installed so that women can care for other women in the church. Such has been the practice of all Korean Presbyterian churches since its inception, which is practiced across denominational boundaries.

==== Hispanic churches ====
There are about 40 Hispanic American PCA churches in Alabama, Florida, California, Georgia, Illinois, Mississippi, New York, North Carolina, Puerto Rico, South Carolina, Tennessee, Texas and also in Virginia.

==== Brazilian congregations ====
Approximately 15 Brazilian or Portuguese-speaking congregations were affiliated with the denomination in 2011, mainly in Massachusetts, Connecticut, New York, Georgia, New Jersey and Florida.

==== Others ====
Several multi-ethnic African American, Haitian, Japanese, Nepali, Albanian, Indian, Sudanese, Indonesian, and Russian ethnic churches belong to the Presbyterian Church in America and the denomination begun to build relationship with the First Nations/Native American groups in the United States and Canada.

The PCA has congregations outside North America. These International congregations can be found in the Grand Cayman Island, in Okinawa, Japan, South Korea, Prague and various cities (Berlin, Cologne, Stuttgart and Munich) in Germany.

== Affiliations and agencies ==
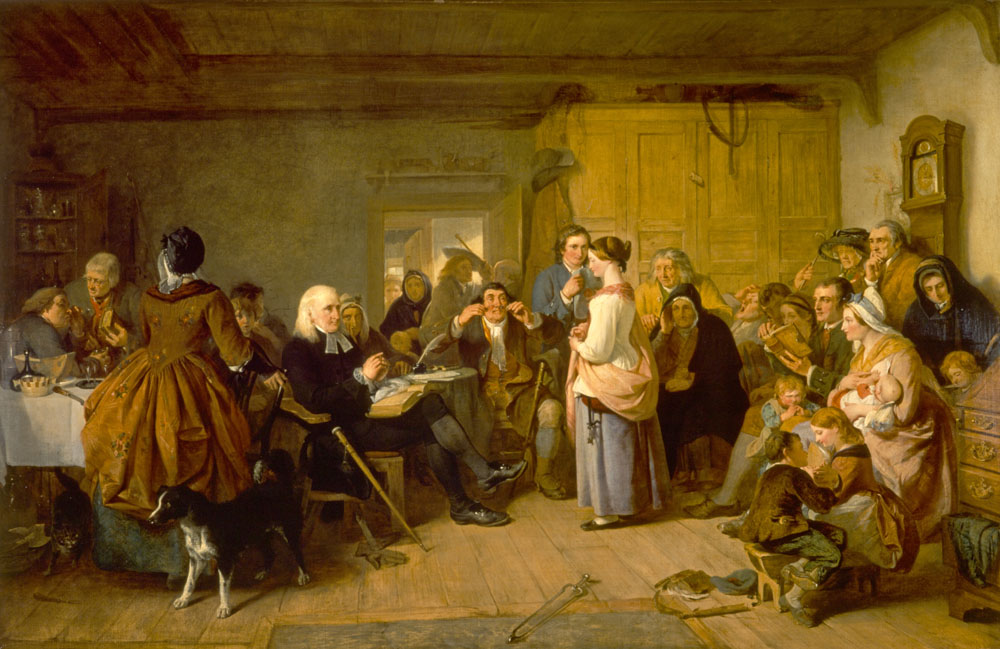
Presbyterian catechising, 19th century

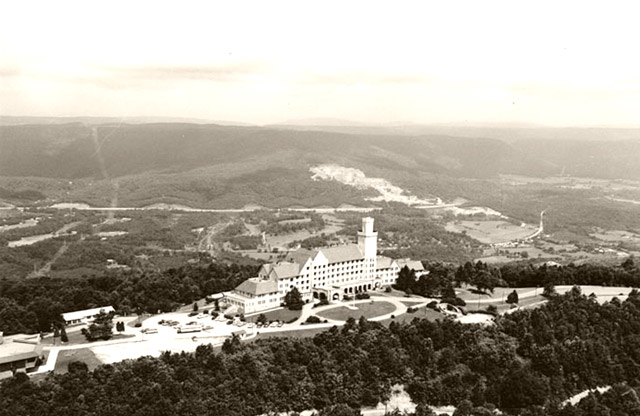
The Lookout Mountain Hotel on Lookout Mountain, Georgia, now home to Covenant College

=== Missions ===
Additionally, the denomination has its own agency for sending missionaries around the world (Mission to the World)(MTW). Through Mission to the World well over 600 foreign missionaries are working in about 60 nations. Mission to North America serves PCA churches and presbyteries through the development of evangelism and church planting in Canada and the USA. An average of 3 new churches are planted in a month in the 2 nations and currently has more than 300 mission churches in the United States alone. More than 40% of all congregations are less than 25 years old, due to church planting. The PCA puts into the field the world's largest Presbyterian mission force after that of the Global Missions Society of the Presbyterian Church in Korea (HapDong) with over 2,500 missionaries.

The PCA church planters must raise their own support and the denomination turned to the use of church planting networks of like-minded churches to found church planters. The PCA frequently use the evangelist model of starting a new church where the evangelist under the oversight of the Presbyteries home missions committee has the power of the sessions in his own person. The PCA supports one foreign missionary for every three congregations.

Further, there are more than 100 chaplains in the military, hospitals, prisons and 45 college and university campus ministers. The church has high emphasis on education.

=== Educational and Theological institutions ===
The PCA has its own ministry to students on college campuses, the Reformed University Fellowship, its own camp and conference center, the Ridge Haven Conference and Retreat Center (Ridge Haven in Brevard, North Carolina), and its own liberal arts college (Covenant College in Lookout Mountain, Georgia, near Chattanooga, Tennessee) and seminary (Covenant Theological Seminary in Saint Louis, Missouri). Covenant Theological Seminary is a fully accredited theological institution that offers several academic degrees: Master of Divinity, Master of Arts, Master of Theology and Doctor of Ministry. The Seminary is home to the Francis Schaeffer Institute. The PCA also publishes its own denominational magazine, byFaith.

=== Headquarters ===
The church maintains headquarters in Lawrenceville, Georgia, a suburb of Atlanta.

The PCA Ministry Buildings in Lawrenceville is the location from which the ministries of the denomination are coordinated. These ministries are Mission to the World, Mission to North America, Christian Education and Publications, Administrative Committee and Reformed University Fellowship (RUF).

== Relations with other Reformed Churches ==
In 1975, the PCA joined the Orthodox Presbyterian Church (OPC), Reformed Presbyterian Church of North America (RPCNA), Reformed Presbyterian Church, Evangelical Synod (RPCES) and Christian Reformed Church in North America (CRCNA) in becoming charter members of the North American Presbyterian and Reformed Council (NAPARC), of which it remains a part.

The PCA is also part of the World Reformed Fellowship (WRF), a worldwide organisation of Churches where about 70 Reformed, Presbyterian and Reformed Baptist, Anglican denominations, as well as congregations and individuals can also participate. It was a member of the National Association of Evangelicals, but voted on June 22, 2022 to leave the organization.

The Presbyterian Church in America enjoys fraternal relations with the Orthodox Presbyterian Church. In 2008 the Presbyterian Church of Brazil and the Presbyterian Church in America entered into full fraternal relationship with each other. The National Presbyterian Church in Mexico and the PCA also work together in missions and evangelizing. In 2012 at the PCA 41st General Assembly the Presbyterian Church in America and the National Presbyterian Church in Mexico entered into an assembly level ecclesiastical relationship. In 1994 The Fellowship of Reformed Churches was formed and was a product of the dialogue between the PCA, the Presbyterian Church in Brazil and the National Presbyterian Church in Mexico. They decided to invite other Latin American Reformed Churches to join the Fellowship.

PCA missionaries have helped found the Evangelical Presbyterian Church in England and Wales, the Evangelical Presbyterian Church of Ukraine, the Christian Presbyterian Church in Portugal, the Iglesia Reformada Evangélica Presbiteriana de Colombia, the Presbyterian Church in America, Chile, the Africa Evangelical Presbyterian Church and the Westminster Presbyterian Church of Australia.

== Notable churches in the PCA ==
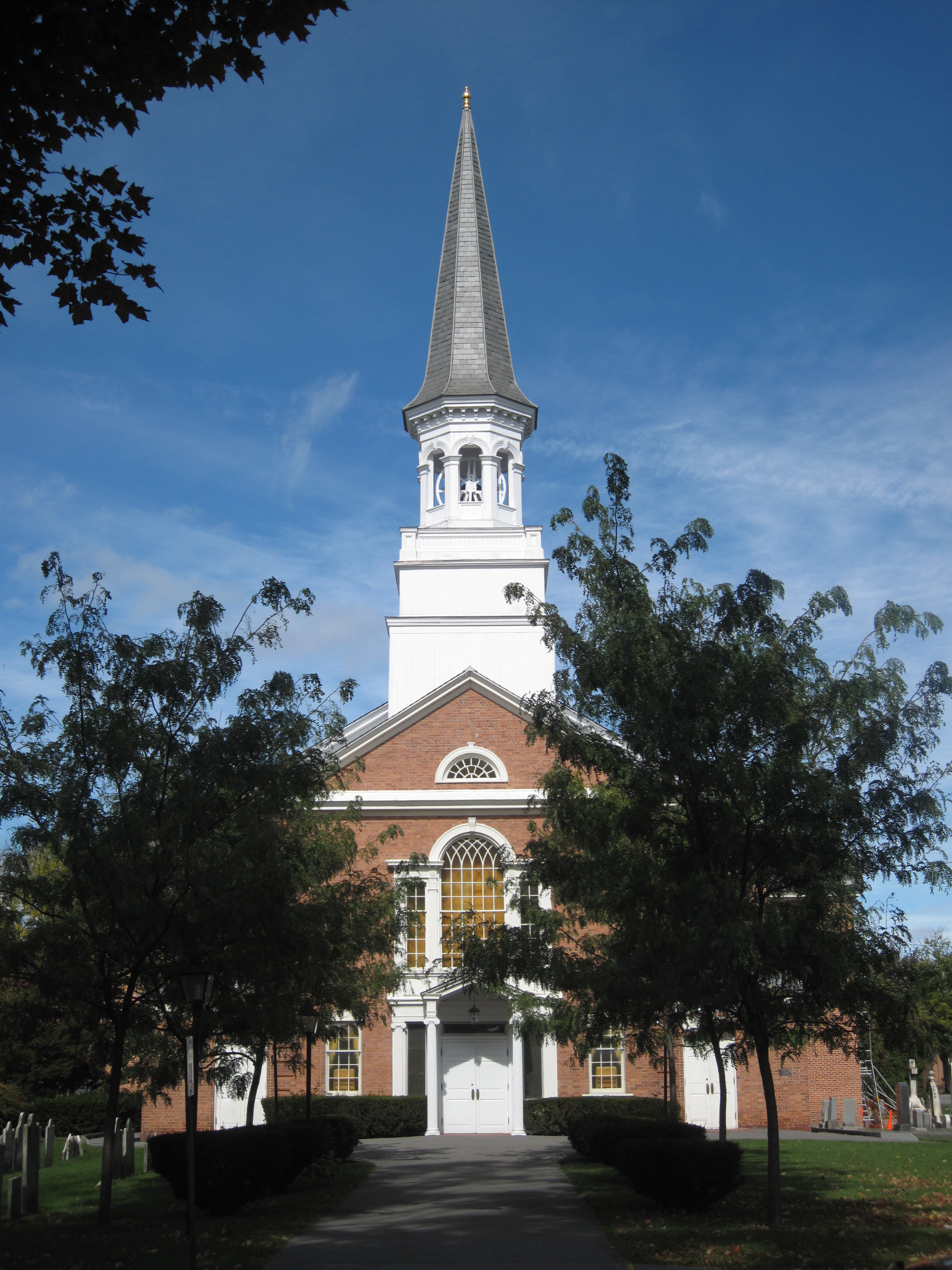
First Presbyterian Church in Schenectady, New York

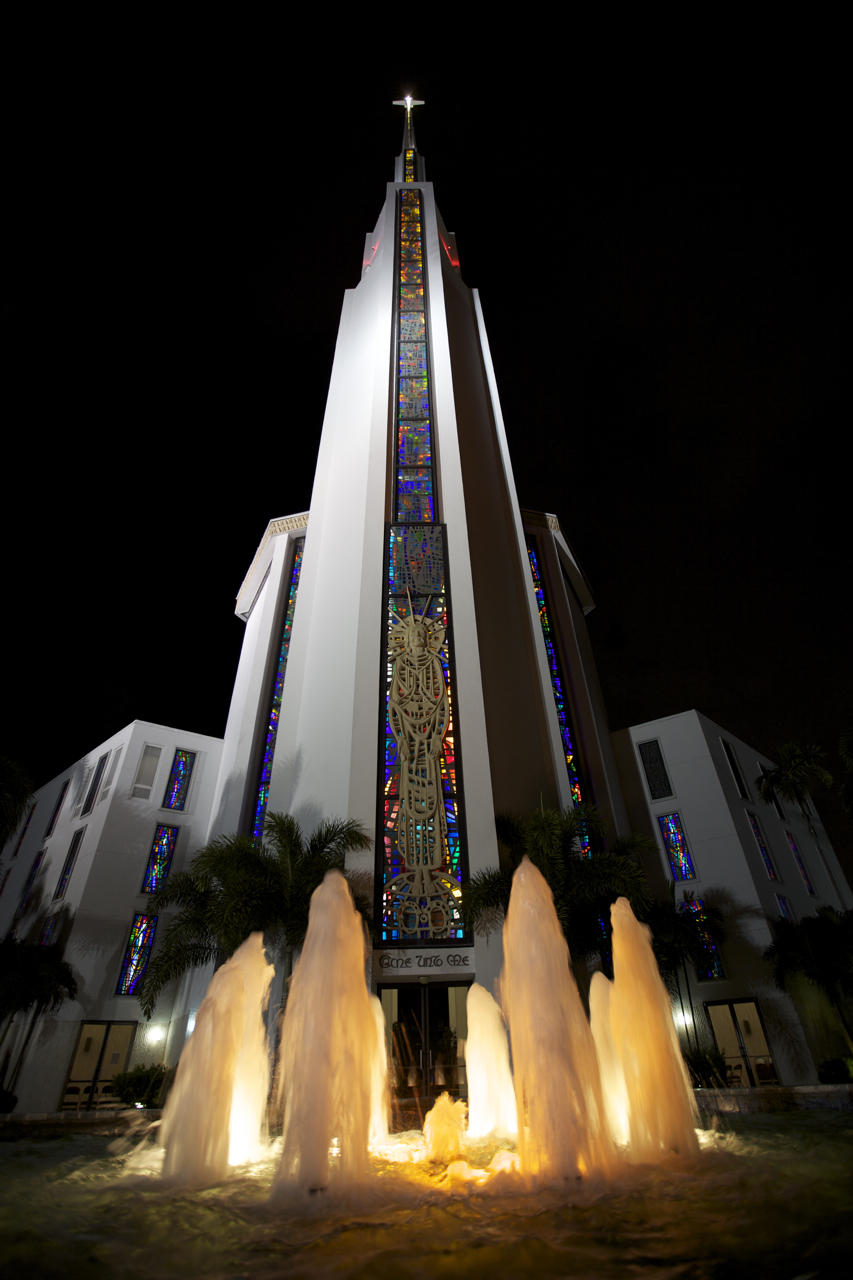
Coral Ridge Presbyterian Church, Fort Lauderdale, Florida, founded by D. James Kennedy, joined the PCA from the PCUS in 1983.

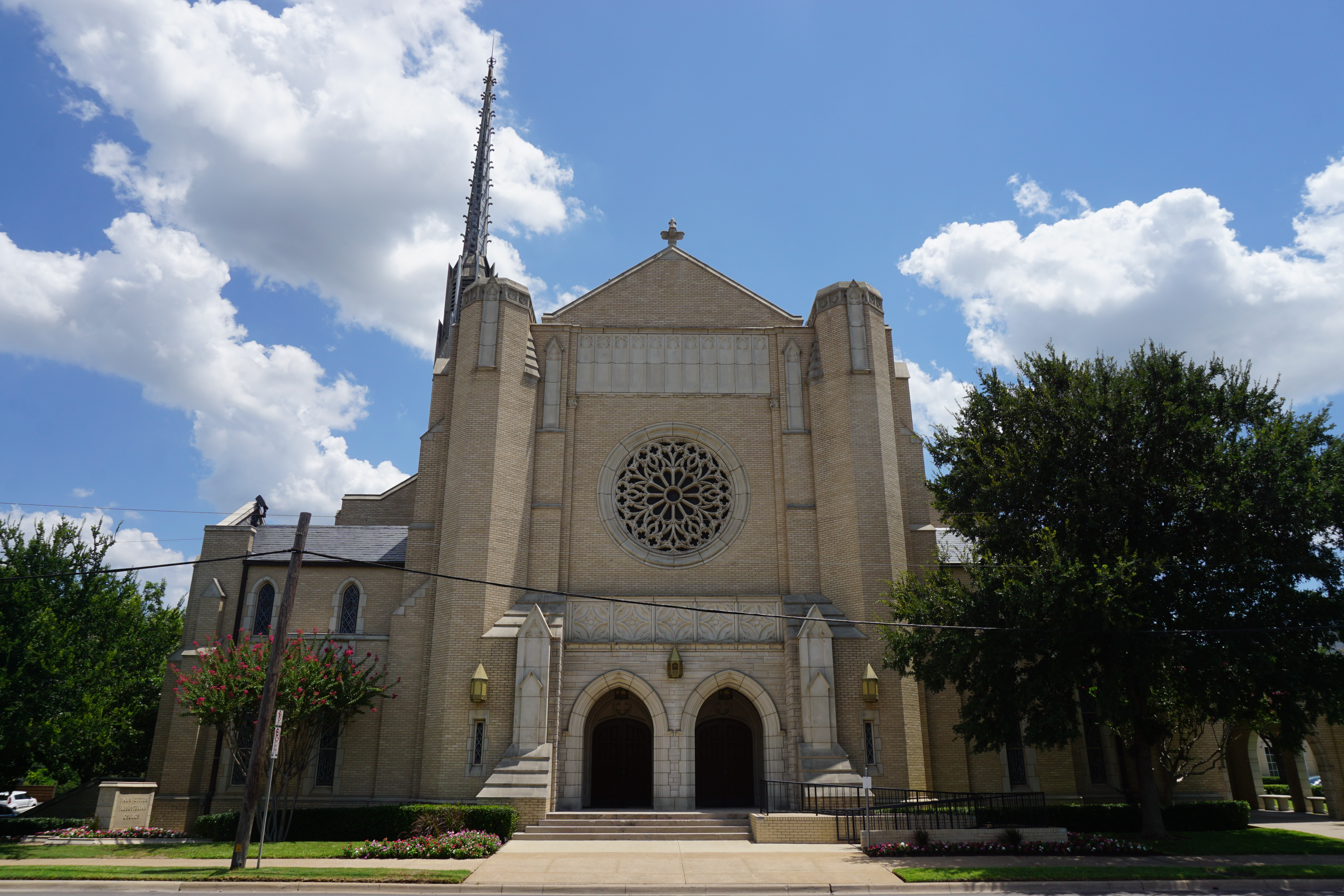
Park Cities Presbyterian Church in Dallas, Texas, the largest English-speaking PCA church

- Back Creek Presbyterian Church (Mount Ulla, North Carolina)
- Bethel Presbyterian Church (Clover, South Carolina)
- Bethesda Presbyterian Church (Edwards, Mississippi)
- Briarwood Presbyterian Church (Birmingham, Alabama)
- Christ Presbyterian Church (Nashville, Tennessee)
- Christ the King Presbyterian Church (Cambridge, Massachusetts)
- City Presbyterian Church (Oklahoma City)
- College Hill Presbyterian Church (Oxford, Mississippi)
- Coral Ridge Presbyterian Church (Fort Lauderdale, Florida)
- Covenant Presbyterian Church (Chicago, Illinois)
- Fairfield Presbyterian Church (Fairton, New Jersey)
- First Presbyterian Church (Eutaw, Alabama)
- First Presbyterian Church (Camden, Alabama)
- First Presbyterian Church (Greenville, Alabama)
- First Presbyterian Church (Augusta, Georgia)
- First Presbyterian Church (Macon, Georgia)
- First Presbyterian Church (Hattiesburg, Mississippi)
- First Presbyterian Church (Jackson, Mississippi)
- First Presbyterian Church (Schenectady, New York)
- First Presbyterian Church (Chattanooga, Tennessee)
- First Presbyterian Church (Uniontown, Alabama)
- Grace Presbyterian Church (Peoria, Illinois)
- Grace Toronto Church
- Hickory Withe Presbyterian Church (Hickory Withe, Tennessee)
- Independent Presbyterian Church (Memphis, Tennessee)
- Korean Central Presbyterian Church (Centreville, Virginia)
- Korean United Church (Philadelphia, Pennsylvania)
- Lebanon Presbyterian Church in Utica, Mississippi
- Midway Presbyterian Church and Cemetery
- New Hope Christian Church (Monsey, New York)
- Old Broad Street Presbyterian Church and Cemetery
- Old First Presbyterian Church (Kosciusko, Mississippi)
- Park Cities Presbyterian Church (Dallas, Texas)
- Perimeter Church in Johns Creek, GA
- Pine Ridge Presbyterian Church in Natchez, Mississippi
- Redeemer Presbyterian Church (New York City)
- Reformed Presbyterian Church Parsonage (Duanesburg, New York)
- Sarang Community Church of Southern California (Anaheim, California)
- Tenth Presbyterian Church (Philadelphia)
- Third Presbyterian Church (Birmingham, Alabama)
- Trinity Presbyterian Church (Montgomery, Alabama)
- Union Church Presbyterian Church in Union Church, Mississippi
- University Reformed Church (East Lansing, Michigan)
- Wallace Presbyterian Church (College Park, Maryland)
- West End Presbyterian Church (Richmond, Virginia)
- Zion Presbyterian Church (Columbia, Tennessee)

== Notable people in the history of the PCA ==
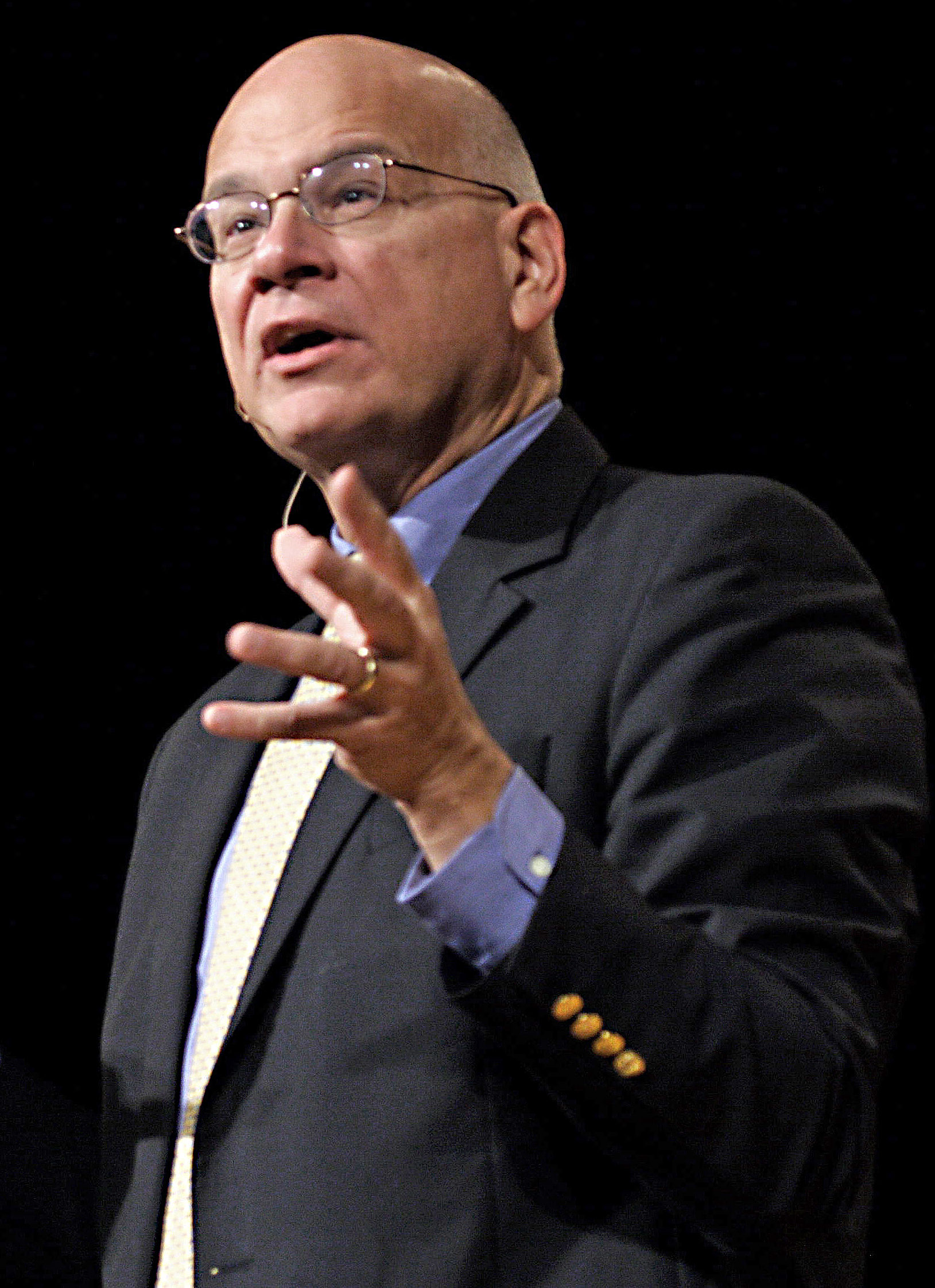
Tim Keller, pastor and founder of Redeemer Presbyterian Church (New York City)

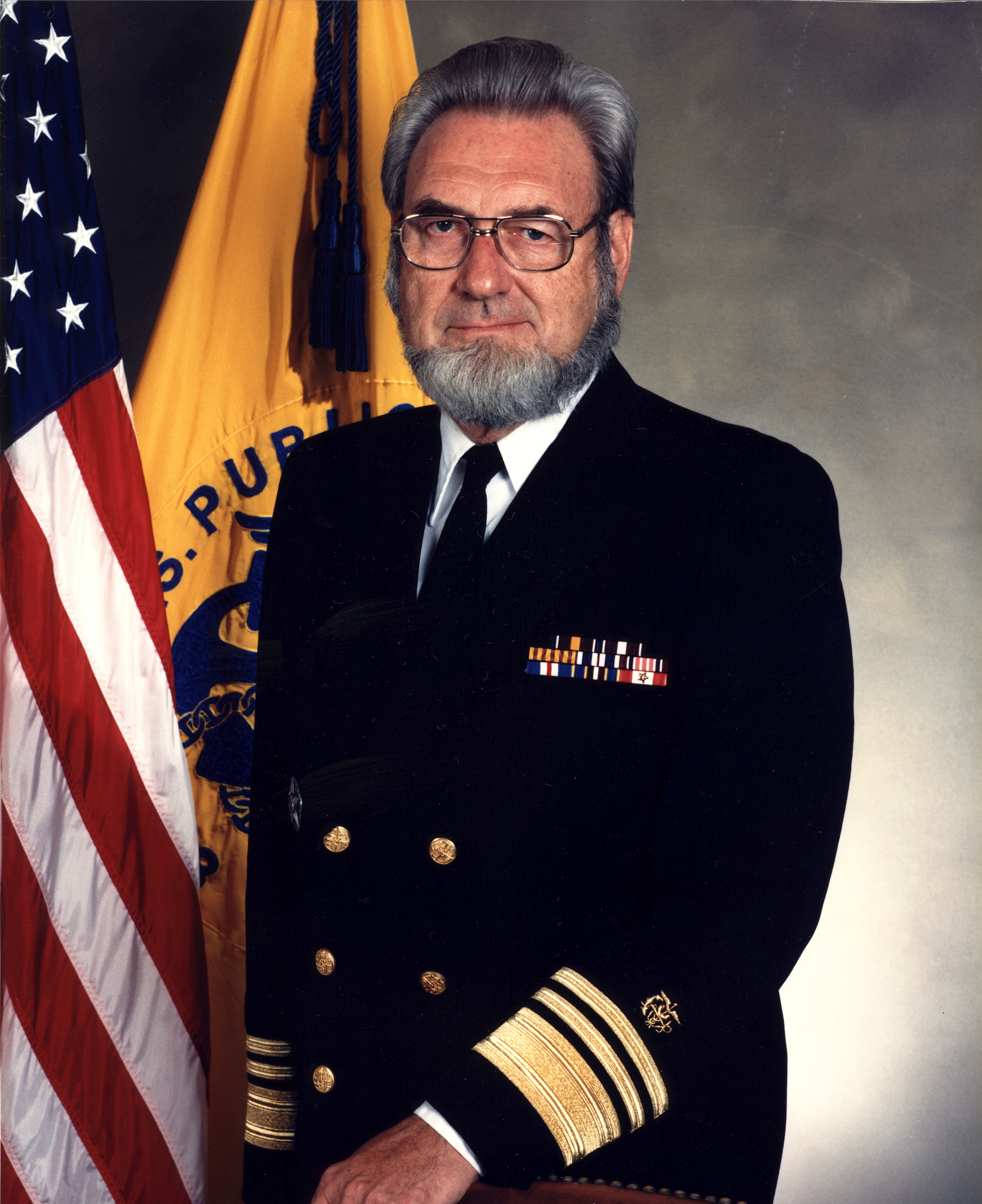
C. Everett Koop, Surgeon General of the United States from 1982 to 1989

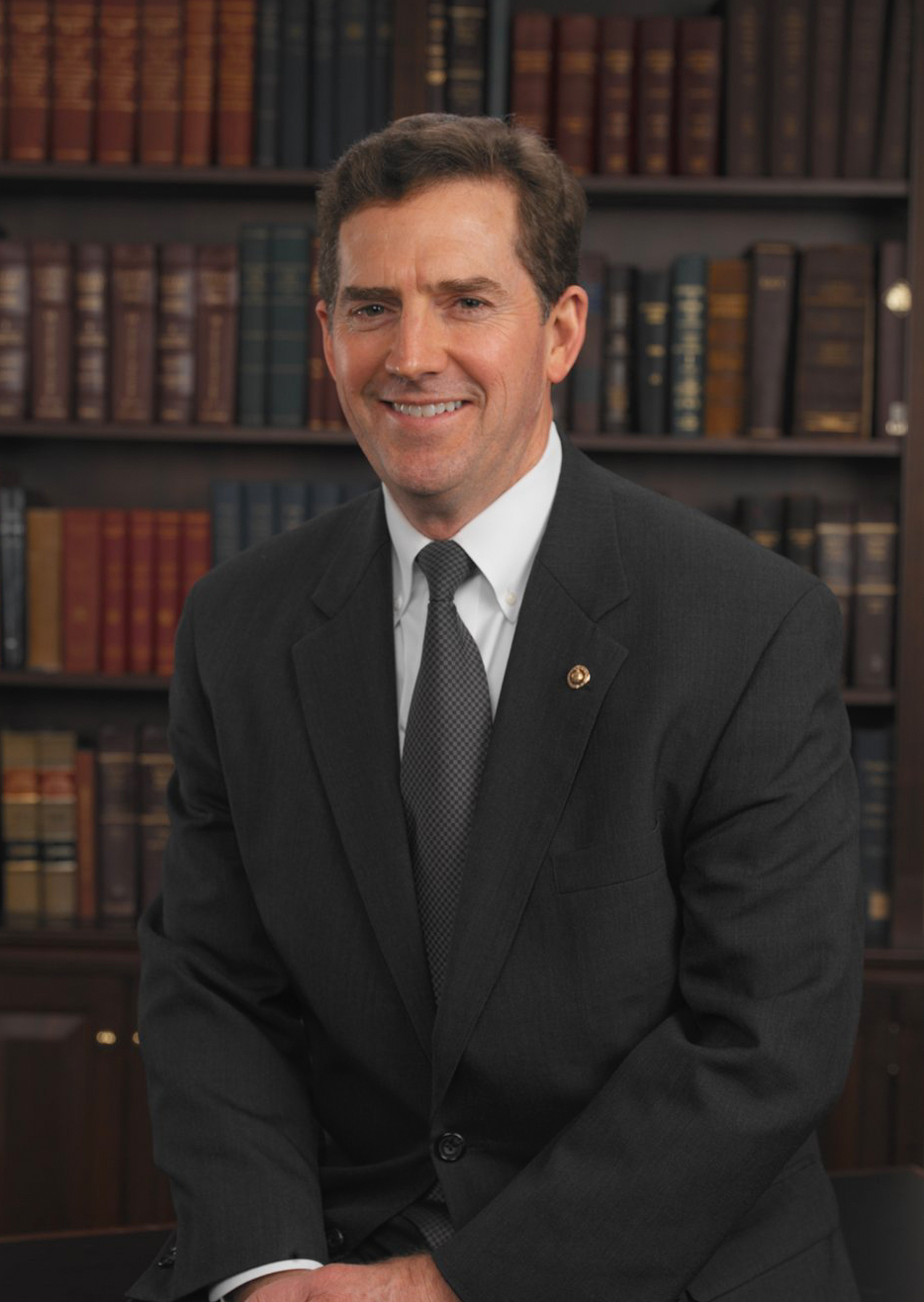
Jim DeMint, former U.S. senator and former president of The Heritage Foundation

- William S. Barker, former president of Covenant Theological Seminary
- Susan Wise Bauer, founder of Peace Hill Press
- Joel Belz, founder of God's World Publications
- Marsha Blackburn, US senator from Tennessee
- James Montgomery Boice, Tenth Presbyterian Church, founder of the Alliance of Confessing Evangelicals
- Anthony Bradley, at The King's College (New York), fellow at the Acton Institute
- Michael Card, singer, songwriter, author, composer, radio host
- Bryan Chapell, former chancellor of Covenant Theological Seminary, author, pastor
- Steven Curtis Chapman, musician, singer-songwriter, record producer, actor, author
- Edmund Clowney, theologian, professor at Westminster Theological Seminary and pastor
- C. John Collins, theologian, professor at Covenant Theological Seminary, author, and Old Testament scholar
- Gary DeMar, American writer and president of American Vision
- Jim DeMint, former U.S. senator and former president of The Heritage Foundation
- Kevin DeYoung, author, blogger for The Gospel Coalition, and pastor of Christ Covenant Church in Matthews, North Carolina
- Ligon Duncan, Chancellor/CEO of Reformed Theological Seminary
- Dave Ferriss, Boston Red Sox pitcher
- Mike Folmer, member of the Pennsylvania Senate
- John Gerstner, Church historian, Jonathan Edwards scholar, and mentor to R. C. Sproul
- George Grant (author), pastor, evangelical writer
- Steve Green, Christian music singer
- Ben Haden, pastor, radio host, and evangelist
- R. Laird Harris, pastor, church leader
- Bob Inglis, former member of the U.S. House of Representatives from South Carolina
- Tim Keller, founding pastor, Redeemer Presbyterian Church, founding member of The Gospel Coalition
- D. James Kennedy founding Senior Pastor of Coral Ridge Presbyterian Church (Coral Ridge, FL), Coral Ridge Ministries, Evangelism Explosion, and Knox Theological Seminary
- Julius Kim, president of The Gospel Coalition
- Lloyd Kim, coordinator of Mission to the World
- Walter Kim, president of National Association of Evangelicals
- Paul Kooistra, former President of Covenant Theological Seminary, retired Coordinator of Mission to the World, former President of Erskine College
- C. Everett Koop, U.S. Surgeon General (1982–1989)
- Won Sang Lee, late pastor emeritus of Korean Central Presbyterian Church
- Peter Lillback, president of Westminster Theological Seminary
- Stephen Winn Linton, president of Eugene Bell Foundation
- Richard Lints, vice president for academic affairs and dean of Gordon-Conwell Theological Seminary's Hamilton Campus
- Samuel T. Logan, former international director of World Reformed Fellowship, former president of Westminster Theological Seminary
- Allan MacRae, founder of Biblical Theological Seminary, currently known as Missio Seminary
- Paul McNulty, president, Grove City College, former Deputy Attorney General of the United States
- Michael A. Milton, pastor, educator, author, U.S. Army Reserve Chaplain, composer
- Gary North (economist), economic historian
- Michael Oh, CEO, Lausanne Committee for World Evangelization
- Raymond C. Ortlund Jr., president of Renewal Ministries, regional director in the Acts 29 Network
- Vern Poythress, Calvinist philosopher and theologian and New Testament scholar
- Larry Pratt, former executive director of Gun Owners of America
- Dan Quayle, 44th vice president of the United States
- Robert G. Rayburn, founding president of Covenant Theological Seminary
- Robert L. Reymond, theologian, author, and pastor
- Philip Ryken, president of Wheaton College (Wheaton, Illinois)
- Ben Sasse, former United States senator from Nebraska
- Francis Schaeffer of L'Abri (Huemoz, Switzerland)
- R. C. Sproul, Reformed theologian, founder of Ligonier Ministries
- Joni Eareckson Tada, author, artist, singer, radio personality, advocate for the disabled
- Jim Talent, former United States senator from Missouri
- Kathy Tyers, musician and author
- Raquel Welch, American actress

== See also ==
- Bible Presbyterian Church
- Evangelical Presbyterian Church (1961)
- Old-, New-, and Neo-Calvinism
- Old School-New School Controversy
- Orthodox Presbyterian Church
- Presbyterian Church in the United States
- Reformed Presbyterian Church, Evangelical Synod
- Reformed Presbyterian Church, General Synod
- Westminster Standards
- Protestantism in the United States
