= First Presbyterian Church (Camden, Alabama) =

Historic Church in the United States

Coordinates: 31.994°N 87.294°W

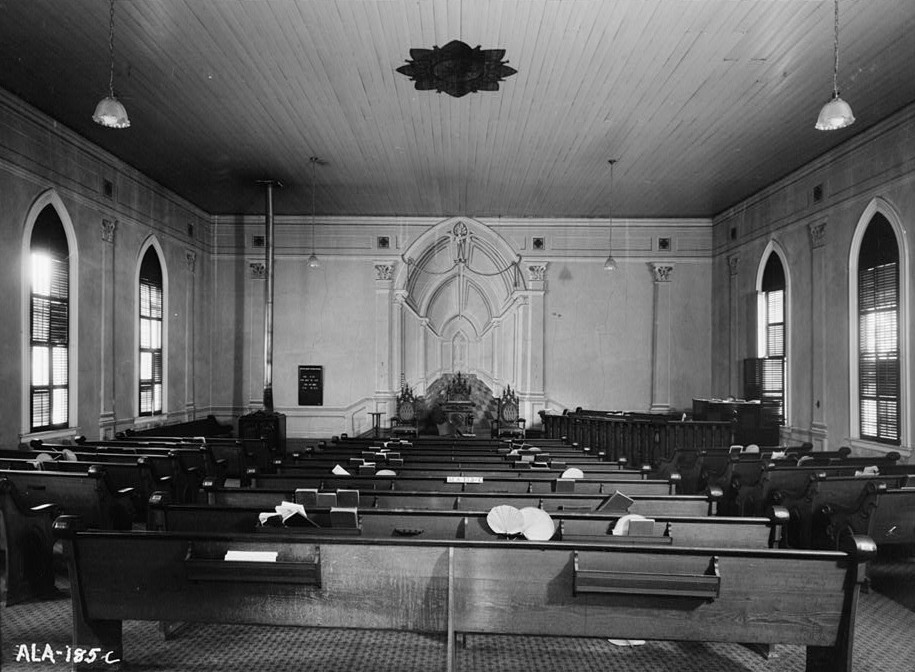
Interior of First pres church

First Presbyterian Church is a historic Presbyterian Church in America congregation in Camden, AL. The church was organised in 1845. Originally known as the Old School Presbyterian Church, its charter members numbered twenty-three. First Ruling Elders were Alexander McLeod and W. Patton. The original church building was burned down in 1868, and a wood sanctuary was erected in the 1880s. The interior walls were decorated with trompe l’oeisle (simulated Gothic apse behind the pulpit) and painted pilasters and medallions until the restoration in the 1950s.
