= College Hill Presbyterian Church =

Historic church in Mississippi, United States

- College Church
- U.S. National Register of Historic Places
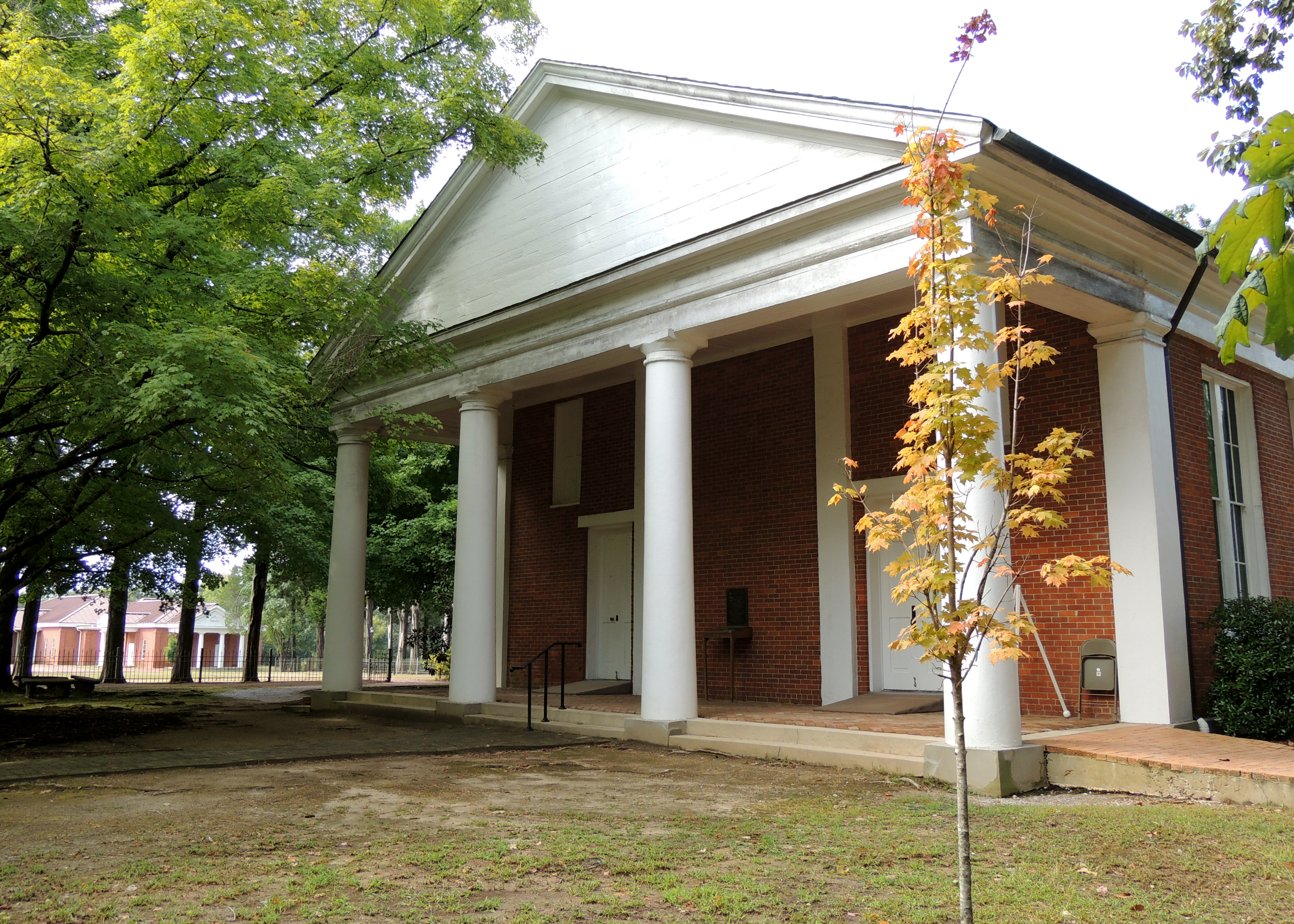

- Location within Mississippi Location within the United States
- Location: College Hill Rd, Oxford, Mississippi
- Coordinates: 34°25′23″N 89°34′6″W
- Area: 1.9 acres (0.77 ha)
- Built: 1846
- Architect: Timmons, Francis
- Architectural style: Greek Revival
- NRHP reference No.: 79001324
- Added to NRHP: November 13, 1979

College Hill Presbyterian Church, located just outside Oxford, Mississippi, USA, at College Hill, is an historic church and a member of the Presbyterian Church in America (PCA). It is listed on the National Register of Historic Places.

It was organized as a local church on January 11, 1835, in the home of Alexander Shaw, one of the early Scot-Irish settlers in North Mississippi. Originally it was named Neriah Church, but shortly thereafter it was redesignated Ebenezer Church.

In 1836, members migrated to this area and, on January 11, 1841, the church was renamed College Presbyterian Church in recognition of the founding of the North Mississippi College. In 1842, the congregation paid $400 for 23 acres (93,000 m^{2}) of land on which to construct a public place of worship. The sanctuary, built in 1844 under the direction of Francis Timmons, was the oldest Presbyterian structure in North Mississippi and the oldest church building of any denomination in the Oxford area. Constructed of bricks fired on the site, the building was completed in 1846 at a total cost of $2,809,75. The pulpit, the pews and the pew gates were the original furnishings.

Events of interest include the encampment of these grounds by Union troops of General Grant and General Sherman, and the marriage of the author William Faulkner. The church is thought to be the model for some settings in Faulkner's novels. The church cemetery contains a number of unmarked Union soldiers' burial sites. The Session's original minutes, dating back to the 1835 organizational meeting, are safeguarded in a local bank.

In the 1960s, the ministry of the church began an outreach to the students of the nearby University of Mississippi under pastor Jack C. Oates (1967–72) while he was a graduate student and teaching assistant at the university as well as teaching in the university's continuing education program. He was also a part-time pastor at two other churches, Hopewell Presbyterian and Abbeville Presbyterian, comprising a three church field in St. Andrew Presbytery of the former Southern Presbyterian Church (PCUS).

The ministry continued to grow while Tom Tyndall was the pastor to the three church field and then just to College Hill Church from 1973 to 1978. In summer, 1977 the PCUS cited the church's outreach to students as one of two outstanding small church ministries in the denomination. Under both Oates and Tyndall, the church held "Christian Life Conferences" with well-known Christian scholars speaking both to the church and to various classes held on the campus of the university.

On August 13, 2022, the original church building was destroyed by a fire. The church continues to meet in another building across the quad from the remains of the previous one.
