= Korean United Church =

Church in Philadelphia, United States

The Korean United Church was founded by Korean immigrants in 1965 in Philadelphia. Once a United Presbyterian Church in the United States of America, it is now a member of the Presbyterian Church in America. Theology is Reformed (they affirm the Westminster Confession), the governance is Presbyterian with some Congregational elements. The church once had 1,200 members in its peak in 2004 under Rev. Daniel Kim's leadership, but by 2020 attracted about 500 worshipers. The former pastors included Henry Koh, Ted K. Lim, and Daniel SeungWook Kim. The church has produced well-known Christian leaders such as Ted K. Lim, former president of Asia United Theological University and Michael Oh, the CEO of the Lausanne Committee for World Evangelization.
