= American Reformation Presbyterian Church =

Former Presbyterian denomination

- Classification: Protestant
- Orientation: Reformed
- Theology: Calvinist Evangelical
- Polity: Presbyterian
- Region: United States
- Origin: 1994
- Separated from: Presbyterian Church in America
- Merged into: Reformed Presbyterian Church - Hanover Presbytery

The American Reformation Presbyterian Church (ARPC) was a Presbyterian denomination, formed in 1994, by churches that separated from Presbyterian Church in America over conflicts related to the use of images of Christ.

After 1997, only one church remained in the denomination and it joined Reformed Presbyterian Church - Hanover Presbytery after that.

== History ==
In 1994, a group of churches split from Presbyterian Church in America, due to a disagreement between the churches of one of the presbyteries regarding the use of images of Christ. These churches formed the American Reformation Presbyterian Church (IPRA).

The denomination grew and started missionary work in Myanmar.

However, in the following years, most of the churches that formed the denomination returned to Presbyterian Church in America, became independent or joined another denomination.

In 1997, only First Presbyterian Church of Rowlett remained in the denomination. This church changed its name to Faith Reformed Presbyterian Church in 2006 and joined the Reformed Presbyterian Church - Hanover Presbytery.
