= Midway Presbyterian Church and Cemetery =

Historic church in Georgia, United States

- U.S. National Register of Historic Places
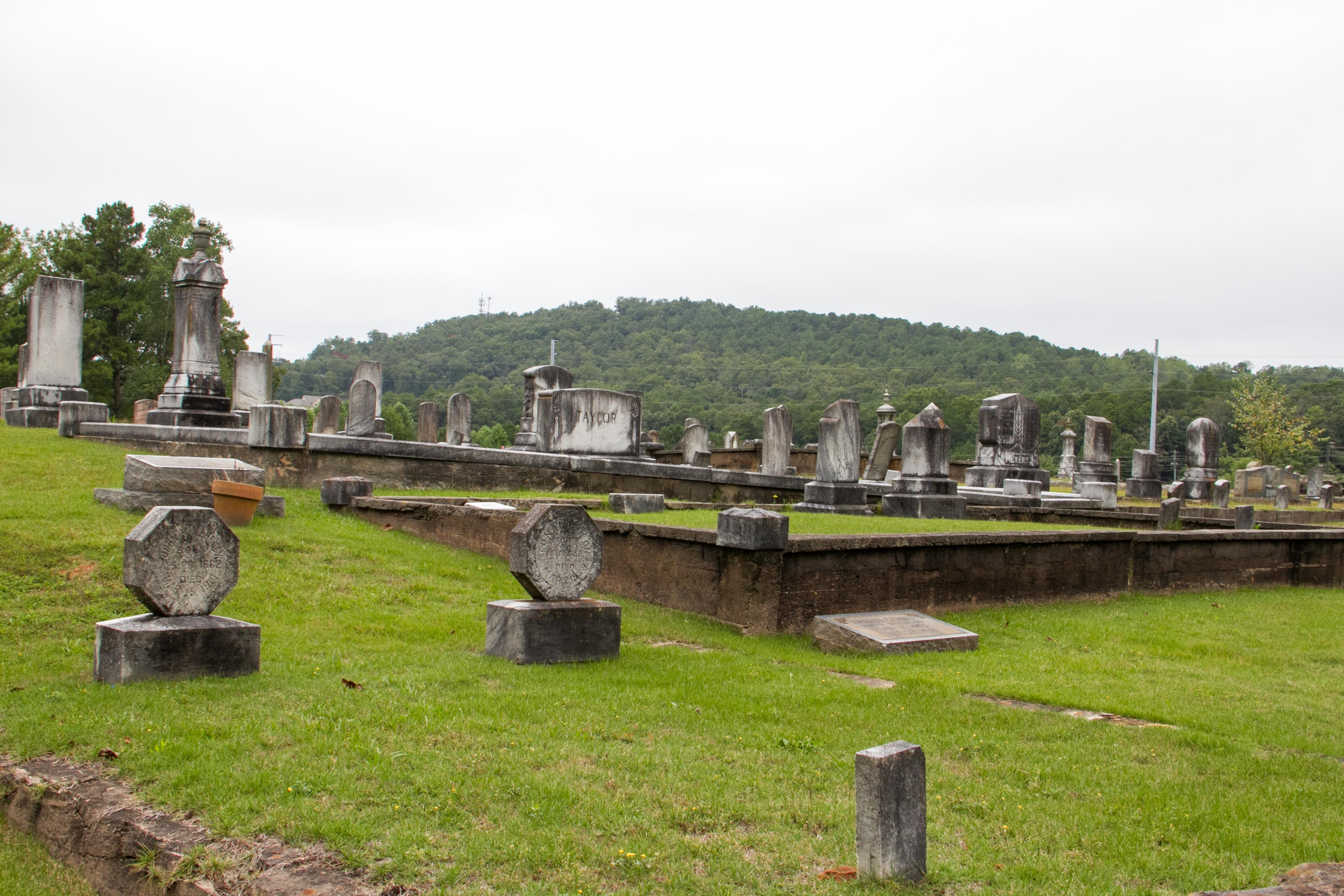
- The church cemetery

- Location within Metro Atlanta Location within Georgia Location within the United States
- Location: 4635 Dallas Hwy./GA 120 SW, Powder Springs, Georgia
- Coordinates: 33°56′37″N 84°41′15″W
- Area: 5 acres (2.0 ha)
- Built: 1905
- NRHP reference No.: 86003526
- Added to NRHP: December 29, 1986

Midway Presbyterian Church and Cemetery is a historic Presbyterian church at 4635 Dallas Highway/GA 120 SW in Powder Springs, Georgia. The congregation was founded in 1850 with fourteen organizing members. The sanctuary was built in 1905 and was added to the National Register of Historic Places in 1986. It still stands in the church property. In 1987 a new much bigger sanctuary was built to accommodate the growing community. The church built a 1,200-seat sanctuary and a 700-seat chapel building because it had outgrown the former structure built in 1987. The congregation is a member of the Presbyterian Church in America, and subscribes the Westminster Confession of Faith. The senior pastor is presently Rev. David W. Hall.
