= Alexander Jun =

- Education: University of Southern California; California State University, Los Angeles
- Employer: Azusa Pacific University

Alexander Jun is an American academic and Presbyterian official. He is a research professor with the Asian American Center at Fuller Theological Seminary, and former moderator of the Presbyterian Church in America. He was also the first-place winner of the 2020 Korean American ROAR Story Slam in Los Angeles, CA.

== Early life ==
Jun graduated from the University of Southern California with a bachelor's degree in political science and psychology. He subsequently earned a master's degree in higher education counseling from California State University, Los Angeles, and a PhD in education administration and policy from the University of Southern California.

== Career ==
Jun was a faculty member at the University of Southern California for 15 years. He later joined Azusa Pacific University as professor of higher education, and is currently a research faculty at Fuller Theological Seminary. He is the author of a book about Latinos in higher education, and the co-author of a second book about white privilege.

Jun was elected as the moderator of the Presbyterian Church in America in June 2017.

== Works ==
- Jun, Alexander (2001). From Here to University: Access, Mobility, and Resilience Among Urban Latino Youth. New York: Routledge. ISBN 9780415937597. OCLC 48486216.
- Collins, Christopher S.; Jun, Alexander (2017). White Out: Understanding White Privilege and Dominance in the Modern Age. New York: Peter Lang. ISBN 9781433135415. OCLC 1011377397.
