= Bethesda Presbyterian Church (Edwards, Mississippi) =

Coordinates: 32.230°N 90.627°W

Bethesda Presbyterian Church is a historic Presbyterian Church in America congregation in Edwards, Mississippi. The church was founded in 1826, and it is among the 50 oldest churches in the PCA.

== History ==
Zebulon Butler came to organize the church in 1828 with eight charter members. Bethesda Presbyterian Church was chosen as the name of the new congregation. A charter member, Mr. Wells donated his property for a meeting place. In 1832, the cypress wood property was finished, however it burned in 1927. The current sanctuary was built during the 100th anniversary year of Bethesda. The congregation began to grow under Rev. John M. Campbell's ministry; almost 120 people joined between 1860 and 1865. Bethesda joined the Southern Presbyterian Church when the denomination was formed. Bethesda joined the PCA in 1973, and has faced dwindling membership a number of times. It is a member of the Mississippi Valley Presbytery. The church building is located at 6688 Canada Cross Road, in Edwards, Mississippi.
