= National Bible Institute School and Dormitory (New York City) =

Historic Building

Coordinates: 40.766010°N 73.985629°W

The Sherwood
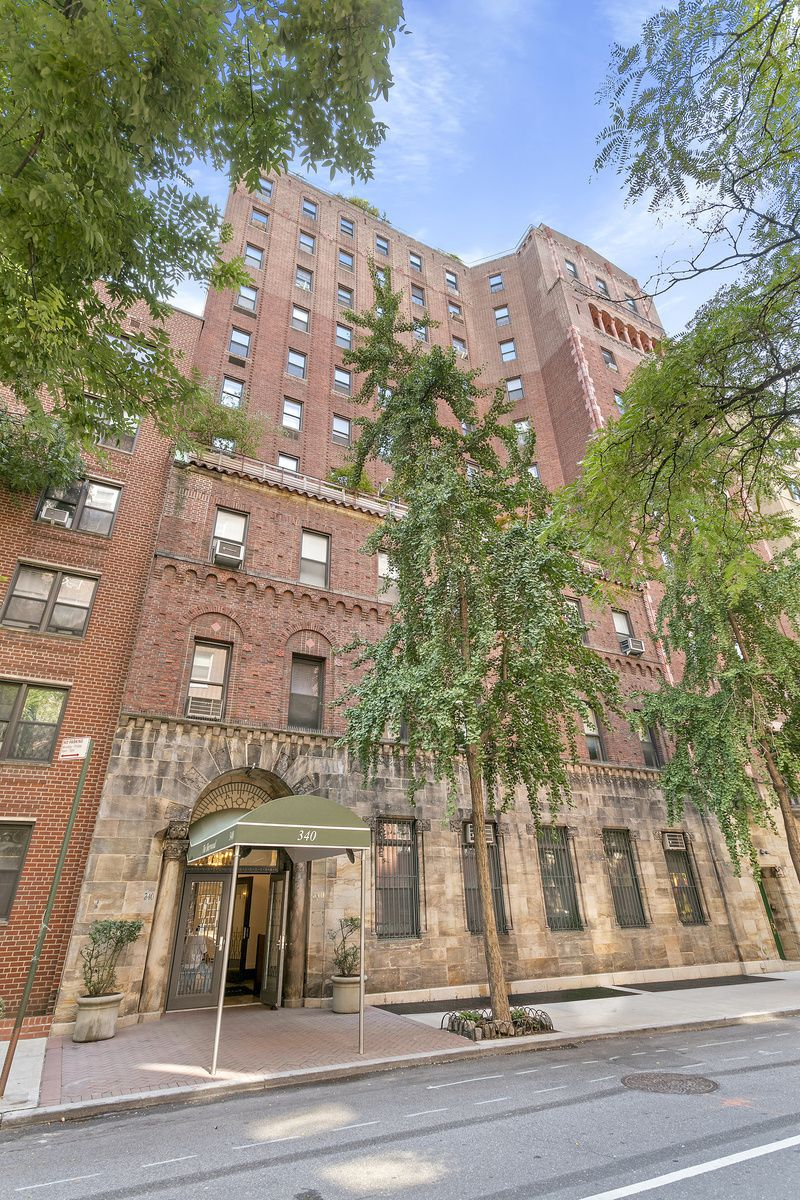
- Interactive map of the The Sherwood area

General information
- Type: Housing cooperative
- Architectural style: Venetian-Gothic
- Location: 340 West 55th Street, New York City, United States
- Construction started: 1922
- Completed: 1925

Technical details
- Structural system: Skyscraper
- Floor count: 11

Design and construction
- Architect: McKenzie, Voorhees and Gmelin
- Main contractor: John Lowry Inc.

The National Bible Institute School and Dormitory is an historic "pre-war" Venetian-Gothic building at 340 West 55th Street between Eighth Avenue and Ninth Avenue in the Hell's Kitchen neighborhood of Manhattan, New York City. It was built in 1925 to serve as a school and dormitory for The National Bible Institute. Today it is a 56 - unit luxury co-op building known as The Sherwood.

== History ==
The Sherwood was built in 1925 originally constructed as the National Bible Institute's new headquarters, by the prestigious architects McKenzie, Voorhees and Gmelin. The building opened on October 13, 1925, at a cost of $1,350,000. with accommodations for 240 resident pupils. The original structure consisted of a library, laboratory, classrooms, lecture hall, dining room, and an auditorium on the main floor.

In May 1950, the National Bible Institute received permission from the New York State Board of Regents to change the institutions name to Shelton College in honor of its founder, Don O. Shelton and to grant the degree of Bachelor of Arts. With its growing activities, Shelton College sold the building in 1952 and moved to Ringwood, New Jersey.

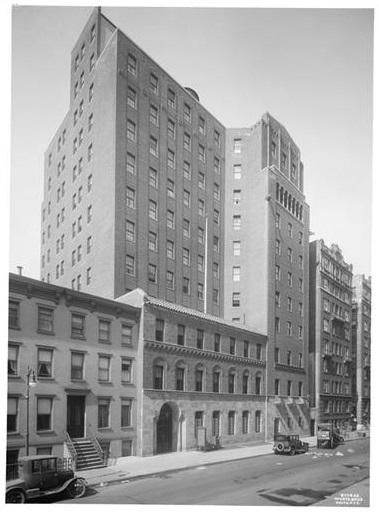
National Bible Institute School & Dormitory- May 4, 1926

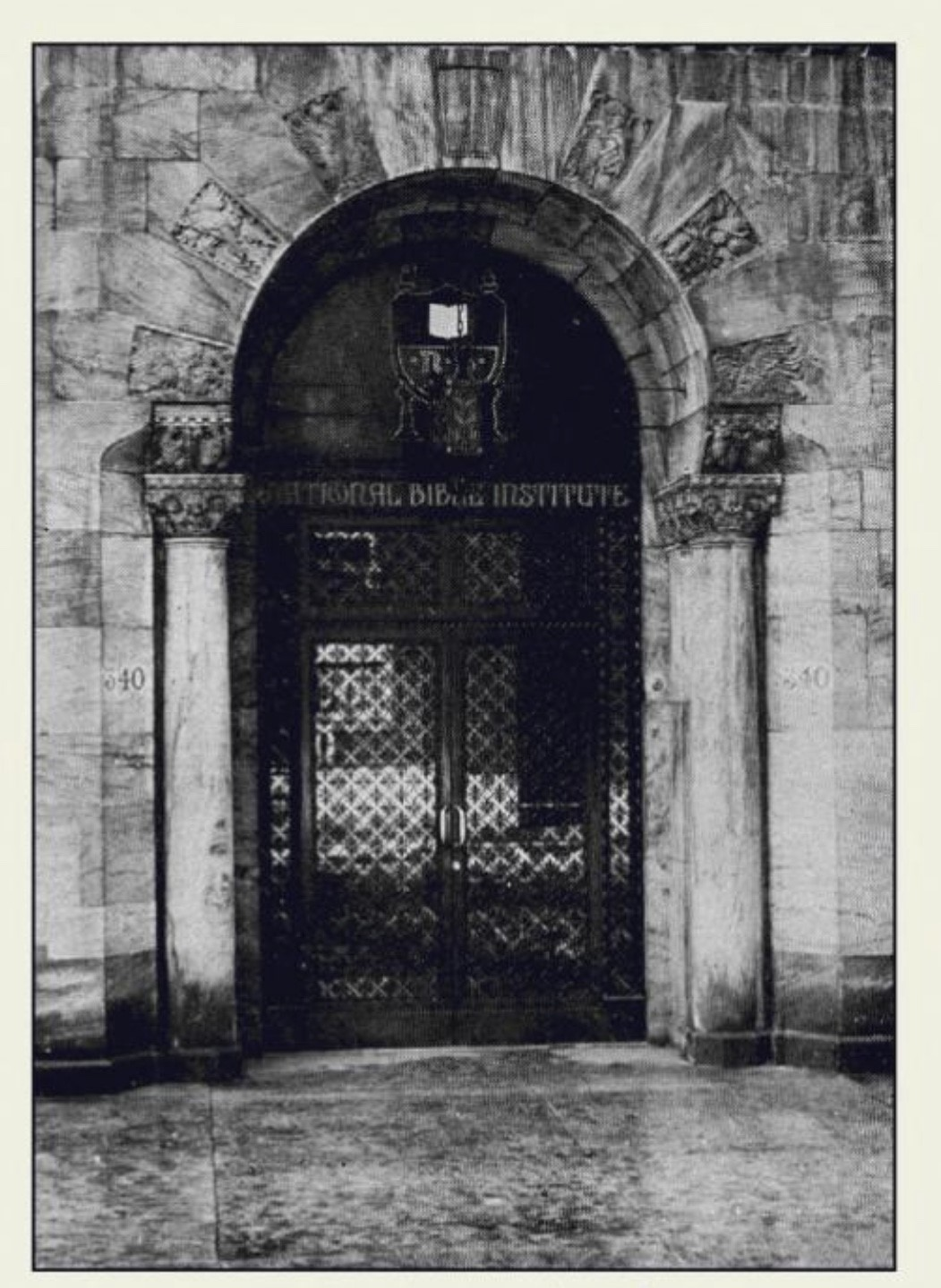
Entrance to the National Bible Institute.

In 1952 the Roman Catholic Archdiocese of New York purchased the building with plans to modernize it for use as a home for the aged. Again the architectural firm Voorhees, Walker, Foley & Smith were hired to alter the building to house 177 elderly men and women. On March 20, 1955 Cardinal Francis Spellman blessed and dedicated the new $2,250,000 Josephine Baird Home for the Aged, operated by the Carmelite Sisters for the Aged and Infirm. The facility was closed in 1972 when it could no longer be brought up to building codes.

In the 1975, the Hare Krishnas purchased the building for $1,000,000 and called 340 West 55th their "Skyscraper temple", amenities included a theater, gift shop, museum, soup kitchen and a hotel, with hundreds of followers living communally in the upper floors. In 1977, Swami Prabhupada died, and soon thereafter, the Krishnas were troubled with financial difficulties. In 1981 local leadership decided to sell the Manhattan property. In 1982, the building was transformed into co-op apartments, as it is known today.

== Architecture ==
The Sherwood blends stone, brick and Venetian-style balconies. Its gray stone base is only one-and-a-half stories high. The George Washington Stone Company built the foundation and base. Detailed carvings rest atop the two columns at the canopied entrance with a scalloped band-course above its second floor. The red tiles of a mid-level setback on the eastern portion of the façade are not pronounced but echo the band-course one floor below. Its angled west wing is subtle and scarcely noticeable.

The bright pink stone window surrounds and the corner quoins on the western end of the second floor are somewhat muted by the seven columned curved rock balconies beneath the windows. The building's west wing has a Venetian-style loggia with seven slender arches on the 9th floor beneath a setback terrace.

The naturalistic, low relief ornament motifs that run along its gray stone base was produced by the architectural sculptors Ulysses Ricci and John De Cesare. Fruits, animals and twisting vines can be discerned, as well as a bible centered above the entrance, the symbol of the National Bible Institute. These stylized elements sit somewhere between medieval revival and Art Deco.

== Notable residents ==
- A. C. Bhaktivedanta Swami Prabhupada founder of The International Society for Krishna Consciousness (ISKCON).
- J. Oliver Buswell - president of the National Bible Institute of New York City
- Agnes M. Craig – Ex-Bronx Justice,
- Albert Stevens Crockett - former foreign correspondent and press agent for the old Waldorf Astoria Hotel.
- Jayananda Dasa - influential religious figure in The International Society for Krishna Consciousness (ISKCON).
- Alden B. Dow - renowned Michigan Architect and son of the founder of Dow Chemical Company, Lived at The National Bible Institute in 1926 for $10 a week.
- Peter Howard (conductor) - American musical theater arranger, conductor and pianist.
- Sophia Grojsman - American perfumer.
- Carl McIntire - founder and minister in the Bible Presbyterian Church.
- Archibald Thomas Robertson (November 6, 1863 – September 24, 1934) was a Southern Baptist preacher and biblical scholar.
- David Schramm (actor) - Actor best known for playing the role of Roy Biggins, on the TV series Wings.
- Frank & Elizabeth Selby - founders of Rex Features, the London photographic agency.
- Don Odell Shelton - founder of The National Bible Institute.
- Scott Shukat - Talent Manager/Agent
- Amelia Summerville Broadway Actress, Died in 1934 after falling on the ice outside the building.
- Concetta Tomei- Actress
- Robert S. Woods - Daytime Emmy Award winning actor known for his portrayal of Bo Buchanan on the ABC soap One Life to Live.

== Notes ==
1. "New home for the aged; $2,250,000 Baird edifice is dedicated by Spellman," New York Times, 3/21/1955, pg. 27
