= Gary G. Cohen =

American biblical scholar (born 1934)

Gary G Cohen
- Born: Gary G Cohen; August 18, 1934
- Education: BSEd, Temple University; M.Div., STM, Faith Theological Seminary; Th.D., Grace Theological Seminary
- Occupation: Christian Educator
- Spouse: Marion Vandermey
- Religion: Christianity - Bible Presbyterian

Gary G. Cohen is President Emeritus of Cohen Theological Seminary, in Torrance, California, and in Seoul, South Korea. After graduating from Temple University in Philadelphia with a B.S.Ed., he taught high school biology and chemistry at Germantown High School in Philadelphia, and physics at Shelton College in Ringwood, New Jersey. Cohen then graduated from Faith Theological Seminary with an M.Div. and a STM, and received his Th.D. from Grace Theological Seminary in Winona Lake, Indiana. In 1989, a Litt.D. was conferred upon him for his writings, including Hosea-Amos, Understanding Revelation, The Horsemen Are Coming, and Weep Not for Me. Articles by him appear in Zion's Fire and in other periodicals.

Cohen was one of the translators of the New King James Bible, and he did editorial work on the Red Letter King James Bible and contributed articles for the Christian Life Bible and the Kirban Prophecy Bible. His articles on Hebrew and Greek words appear in the "Old Testament Theological Word Book" and in "The Complete Bible Library."

Cohen is a retired Army Reserve chaplain (COL), and is a graduate of the United States Air Force Air War College. He has also served as pastor of two churches, as president of both Graham Bible College (in Bristol, Tennessee) and Clearwater Christian College, and as a professor at Miami Christian College.

In 1994, with the help of his family, he built the prototype for the model of the old City of Jerusalem, housed in Orlando, FL, at the Holy Land Experience until its closure in 2020.

== Publications ==
- Biblical Separation Defended (1966) ISBN 978-0875521473
- Civilization's Last Hurrah (1975)
- Understanding Revelation (1978) ISBN 978-0802490223
- The Horsemen Are Coming (1979)
- Weep Not for Me (1980)
- Hosea-Amos (1981) co-authored with H Ronald Vandermey ISBN 978-0802420282
- From Persecution to Service: The Chaplain Gary Cohen Story (2013) ISBN 978-1449797287
