= John W. Murray =

American pastor, evangelist, and educator

John Weir Murray
- Born: October 6, 1913; Laurium, Michigan
- Died: March 20, 1996 (aged 82)
- Occupations: Pastor, evangelist, and educator

John Weir Murray (October 6, 1913 – March 20, 1996), also known as Jack Murray, was an American pastor, evangelist, and educator.

== Biography ==
Murray was born in Laurium, Michigan, and grew up in Bellingham, Washington. He studied at the Bible Institute of Los Angeles, Wheaton College in Illinois, and Faith Theological Seminary. He later received honorary doctorates from Faith as well as from Bob Jones University.

Murray served as an assistant pastor in the Bible Presbyterian Church in Chester, Pennsylvania. He edited his denomination's publication Faith and Fellowship, later called Truth for Youth, from 1944 to 1950. In 1955, when the denomination split, Murray joined with the Collingswood faction and became president of Shelton College.

Murray led the establishment of the Harvey Cedars Bible Conference in 1941, with the purchase of the historic Harvey Cedars Hotel. In 1960, he left Shelton to start a radio evangelism ministry, Bible Evangelism Inc. Murray co-founded Clearwater Christian College in 1966, serving as the Chairman of the Advisory Board. In 1971, along with Allan MacRae, Murray founded Biblical Theological Seminary. MacRae was Murray's friend and former teacher, and although they had different visions for the seminary (MacRae wanted to train scholar-pastors while Murray wanted to focus on evangelism), they were able to work together.

Academic offices
Preceded by J. Oliver Buswell	President of Shelton College; 1955–1960	Succeeded by Clyde J. Kennedy
