= East Africa Christian Alliance =

- Abbreviation: EACA
- Formation: January 1965
- Founder: Carl McIntire
- Founded at: East Africa; Kenya (Nairobi)
- Chairman: Bishop Richard M Kivai
- Parent organization: International Council of Christian Churches

The East Africa Christian Alliance (EACA) is a fundamentalist organization and regional arm of the International Council of Christian Churches, set up in opposition to the All Africa Conference of Churches. The current chairman is Bishop Richard Kivai.

== History ==
EACA was founded in January 1965 by Dr Carl McIntire. It has a graduate theological school, Faith College of the Bible.

== World Congresses ==
- 2015
- 2013

== Denominations ==
There are a number of denominations under EACA including;

1. Independent Presbyterian Church, Mwingi, Kenya
2. Holy Trinity Church in Africa, Kisumu, Kenya
3. Africa Gospel Unity Church, Bomet, Kenya
4. Kenya Church of God in Africa, Kirinyaga, Kenya
5. Church of Jesus Christ in Kenya, Kerugoya, Kenya
6. East Africa Divinity Church, Embu, Kenya
7. Gospel Tabernacle Church, Mombasa, Kenya
8. Good News Church of Africa, Eldoret, Kenya
9. Church of the Holy Spirit Buhaya, Mission Butainamwa, Kianja, Bukoba, Tanzania
10. Kanisa La Neema, Sumbawanga, Tanzania
11. African Church - Kenya
