= Clyde J. Kennedy =

American Bible Presbyterian pastor and educator

Clyde Johnstone Kennedy
- Born: July 2, 1907; Halifax, Nova Scotia, Canada
- Died: September 22, 1962 (aged 55)
- Education: University of California; Princeton Theological Seminary
- Occupations: Pastor, Educator
- Spouse: Dorothy Rose Goodner
- Religion: Christianity - Bible Presbyterian

Clyde J. Kennedy (1907–1962) was an American Bible Presbyterian pastor and Christian educator. He was the president of Shelton College and is best known for being the founder of Highland College.

== Life ==
Clyde Johnstone Kennedy was born on July 2, 1907, in Halifax, Nova Scotia, Canada, to Horace Kennedy and Florence Pamela Davis. His father was of Scotch-Irish and colonial New England Calvinist stock and rose to become chief of detectives of the Halifax police force before moving to California, where he became an arson investigator for the state forestry department.

== Education ==
He obtained his college degree from the University of California at Los Angeles; and upon graduation from Princeton Theological Seminary he was ordained to the ministry of the Presbyterian Church in the U.S.A. in the First Presbyterian Church of Hollywood, California in 1936. Because of modernism, inclusivism, and apostasy, he left that denomination and organized the Calvary Bible Presbyterian Church in Glendale, California, where he served as pastor until 1957. After the death of the Rev. Roy T. Brumbaugh, Kennedy was called to the pastorate of the Tacoma Bible Presbyterian Church, Tacoma, Washington. In 1957, he was elected moderator of the Twenty-first General Synod of the Bible Presbyterian Church.

Earlier he helped in the founding of Highland College, a Bible Presbyterian four-year liberal arts Christian college located in Pasadena, California, and he served as the president of the Board of Trustees of Highland from 1951 until 1957.

He was a member of the Independent Board for Presbyterian Foreign Missions and served on its executive committee, and while on the Pacific Coast lie was Western representative for the Independent Board for Presbyterian Home Missions.

He participated in many activities of the American Council of Christian Churches, which he served as president from 1958 to 1961. He was in journeyings often in behalf of the International Council of Christian Churches, where he served as a member of the Commission on International Relations. When the International Council of Christian Churches dispatched a team to Australia in 1956 to expose the presence of Communist Hromadka on the executive committee of the World Council of Churches, scheduled to meet in Australia, Dr. Kennedy was the advance man for the team and was used of God to help alert Australia.

At the time of the withdrawal of the Presbyterian Church in Korea from the World Council of Churches in 1959, Dr. Kennedy joined the ICCCs team and took part in the campaign which extended throughout South Korea. He was on the ICCC's team that visited Formosa in April 1961 on an extended tour of the island, with a visit to Quemoy and Matsu. He was with the ICCC's delegation that went to New Delhi, November–December, 1961, to attend the Third Assembly of the World Council of Churches.

== Death ==
He died on September 22, 1962.

Academic offices
Preceded by John W. Murray	President of Shelton College; 1960-1962	Succeeded by Arthur E. Steele
