= Arthur E. Steele =

American pastor and educator

- Born: Arthur Edward Steele; June 17, 1920; McKeesport, Pennsylvania, US
- Died: March 2, 2011 (aged 90)
- Education: Faith Theological Seminary
- Occupation: Christian Educator
- Years active: 1959-2011
- Spouse: Dolores
- Religion: Christianity - Bible Presbyterian

Arthur Edward Steele (June 17, 1920 – March 2, 2011) was an American minister of the Bible Presbyterian Church and a Christian educator who served as president of Shelton College and then founded Clearwater Christian College.

== Personal life ==
Arthur Steele was born in McKeesport, Pennsylvania and graduated with a degree in chemical engineering from Carnegie Tech (now Carnegie Mellon University) in 1942. Having been a member of the ROTC, he was commissioned as an officer upon graduation and served during World War II in the Corps of Engineers Research and Development Board as the Supervisor of the Gas Generating School at Fort Belvoir, Virginia.

In 1956, Steele entered Faith Theological Seminary while working part-time employment at Air Products. Upon receiving his Master of Divinity (M.Div.) degree in 1959, he was asked to serve as the vice president and treasurer of the seminary. In 1962, he was appointed president of Shelton College, Ringwood, New Jersey, where he served until 1965.

In 1966, he founded Clearwater Christian College.

Academic offices
Preceded by Clyde J. Kennedy	President of Shelton College; 1962–1965	Succeeded by Carl McIntire
Preceded by New Office	President of Clearwater Christian College; 1966–1987	Succeeded by George D. Youstra
