= Allan MacRae =

American theologian and academic (1902 – 1997)

Allan Alexander MacRae (February 11, 1902 – September 27, 1997) was an evangelical Christian scholar who, with Harold S. Laird, Carl McIntire, Roland K. Armes, and several other conservative Presbyterians, helped found Faith Theological Seminary and, with Jack Murray, Biblical Theological Seminary. Because of his longevity, MacRae engaged in both the battles of the fundamentalist-modernist controversy and with the rise of Neo-evangelicalism in mid-20th century America, playing important roles in the establishment of three conservative American seminaries.

== Biography ==
MacRae was born in Calumet, Michigan, the son of a Canadian-born physician who valued academic pursuits and who attended a social and intellectual club where talks were given and papers read. At age 16, Allan entered Occidental College, receiving a Bachelor of Arts degree in 1922 and a Master of Arts the following year. In 1923–24, MacRae studied under R. A. Torrey at the Bible Institute of Los Angeles. In 1927, he earned a Th.B. and a Master of Arts in Semitic Philology from Princeton Theological Seminary. Awarded a fellowship at the University of Berlin, MacRae studied Arabic, Syriac, Babylonian cuneiform, and Egyptian hieroglyphics, also becoming fluent in German as he engaged in his hobby of mountain hiking. During his second year at the University of Berlin, he spent four months in Palestine, meeting archaeologist Flinders Petrie and studying in the American Schools of Oriental Research under William F. Albright. Although MacRae intended to complete his doctoral work in Berlin, he became so involved in seminary teaching that he instead finished his PhD at the University of Pennsylvania in 1936 with a dissertation on personal names discovered in the ancient Mesopotamian city of Nuzi.

In 1929, Princeton theologian Robert Dick Wilson invited MacRae to join him as his assistant in the Old Testament department of the newly formed Westminster Theological Seminary. There he and Wilson wrote a scholarly refutation of the JEDP theory of higher criticism, supporting the conservative position in the Fundamentalist–Modernist Controversy.

In 1936, after J. Gresham Machen and other conservatives were forced to leave the PCUSA, MacRae became a founding minister of what became the Orthodox Presbyterian Church (OPC). Nevertheless, holding strong beliefs about premillennialism and abstinence from alcohol, MacRae joined with Harold S. Laird, Carl McIntire, Roland K. Armes, and several other conservative Presbyterians to found Faith Theological Seminary, a school intended to serve the Bible Presbyterian Church, of which MacRae became a minister.

At Faith Seminary, MacRae met and married a former student and temporary secretary, Grace E. Sanderson; they had one son, John Phillip MacRae. On his honeymoon, while hiking and climbing in the Grand Canyon, MacRae played a key role in locating and reaching three Army pilots who had parachuted from a B-24 bomber.

In 1956, conflict in the Bible Presbyterian Church—officially about synod-controlled agencies but actually over the strong hand of Carl McIntire in the denomination—resulted in a church split, with most of the faculty of Faith Seminary resigning. MacRae remained loyal to McIntire and the mission of the seminary that they had established. Nevertheless, in 1971, McIntire ousted MacRae, and he, with Jack Murray and others, formed Biblical Theological Seminary. There MacRae continued to teach and serve as seminary president, with his only respite being summer hiking trips taken in various parts of the United States. Though MacRae officially retired in 1983, his chosen successor as head of the seminary soon died; MacRae soldiered on until 1986, when he was 84, and then took the honorary title of chancellor.

During his career MacRae subordinated his personal scholarship to his teaching, but he served as president of the Evangelical Theological Society in 1960. He also worked as an editor for the New Scofield Reference Bible, as a translator for the New International Version of the Bible, and as a commentator for the NIV Study Bible. MacRae was a prolific letter writer, and a selection of his letters was edited by a former colleague, Swee Hwa Quek, and published as Biblical Christianity (1986). A festschrift, R. Laird Harris, et al., Interpretation & History: Essays in Honor of Allan A. MacRae was also published in 1986.

MacRae died on September 27, 1997, at the Quarryville Presbyterian Retirement Home in Quarryville, Pennsylvania.

== Works ==
- The Gospel of Isaiah
- The Prophecies of Daniel
- Biblical Christianity, a compendium of correspondence

Academic offices
Preceded by New Office	President of Faith Theological Seminary; 1937–1971	Succeeded by Carl McIntire
Preceded by New Office	President of Biblical Theological Seminary; 1971–1983	Succeeded by G. Aiken Taylor
