= Independent Presbyterian Church in Kenya =

The Independent Presbyterian Church in Kenya was started in 1948 by missionaries of the Bible Presbyterian Church from the (United States). In 1962 a split occurred in the Bible Presbyterian Church, and in Africa the missionaries divided, the minority group separated became the Africa Evangelical Presbyterian Church. Since 1964 the church became independent. In 1984 a number of parishes left and separated from the denomination and organised themselves the same name of Independent Presbyterian Church in Kenya. Membership is 1 million in 130 congregations in 2004. The church recognises the Apostle Creed, and Westminster Confession of Faith.

According to the recent statistics it has 130 congregations in Kenya and 2 congregation in Uganda and 7 Presbyteries: Mwingi, Kakuyu, Nairobi, Ngomeni, Nguni, Tsekuru, and Mumbuni It also has two other presbyteries namely Kisasi and Mosa in Kitui Rural.The 130 congregations is sprint across 7 regions in Kenya and the 2 congregation lower eastern of Uganda.

The church maintains the Reformed Bible College and Technical College in Mwingi, Kenya. It was started in 1958.

The church is affiliated with the East Africa Christian Alliance.
