= Africa Evangelical Presbyterian Church =

- Abbreviation: A.E.P.C
- Classification: Protestant
- Orientation: conservative Calvinist
- Theology: Reformed, Presbyterian
- Polity: Presbyterian
- Associations: World Reformed Fellowship
- Region: Kenya, Tanzania, Democratic Republic of Congo, Burundi, Zimbabwe
- Founder: Rev. Sanders Campbell and Jack Armes Presbyterian Church in America
- Origin: 1962; Kenya
- Branched from: Presbyterian Church in America, at the founding date the Evangelical Presbyterian Church (1961)
- Separations: Independent Presbyterian Church in Kenya
- Congregations: 105
- Members: 15.000
- Hospitals: 1
- Primary schools: 1

The Africa Evangelical Presbyterian Church (AEPC) is a growing conservative Presbyterian and Reformed Church which adheres to the Westminster Confession of Faith started in Kenya, later spread to the surrounding countries like Burundi, Tanzania, Congo and as far as Zimbabwe. The headquarters of the church is located in Nairobi, Kenya. The current Moderator is Rev. Dr Joseph Mutei (from June 2022) installed on Sunday 26th June 2022.

== History ==
=== Formation ===
Africa Evangelical Presbyterian Church was founded by the World Presbyterian Mission (now the Mission to the World) of the Evangelical Presbyterian Church (1961). In 1946 Rev. and Mrs. Sanders Campbell and other missionaries sent by the Independent Board for Presbyterian Foreign Missions (IBPFM) came to Kenya settled in Mulango, Kitui District. The missionaries were invited to the country by the Africa Inland Mission. The missionaries established a mission station here. In 1948 Rev. Campbell begun preaching at the market place in Mwingi. In 1951 other missionaries came, a couple Rev. and Mrs. John G. Ames. Through converts several churches were planted in Tyaa-Kamuthale and Kakuyu, Thaana. Later the Mwingi station built church building, Bible school, water catchment system. A presbytery was formed, that included 12 congregations in Mwingi, Kakuya, Ngui, Ngomeni, Itundua, Gai and Tyaa-Kamuthale. In 1949, after a conflict with the district authorities, the Mwingi mission was forced to vacate the plot allocated to them. It moved to a temporary location at Makindu on Nairobi-Mombasa road. After appealing to London colonial office the mission won back its plot in Mwingi and returned to it in 1952.

=== Separation and consolidation ===
In 1956 the Bible Presbyterian Church had split and this also affected the missionaries in Kenya. This section was the minority group, the majority become the Independent Presbyterian Church in Kenya. Missionaries Jack Armes and Sandy and Grace Campbell joined World Presbyterian Mission. Their Kenyan pastors moved with them willingly. This was the formation of the AEPC in 1962. For long time the church concentrated in one area in Mwingi presbytery, and remained in one ethnic community. The denomination begun to plant churches in Nairobi and in Urban Kenyan towns. In 1973 the Community Presbyterian Church was founded and later church planting continued. Rev. Campbell went to plant a church in Nairobi. In 1986 Growth and Expansion Committee was formed and in the 1980s the church expanded rapidly. The Beyond Mwingi Mission started dozens of mission churches in Nairobi, Kiambu, Meru, Embu and Nakuru. The church become self-autonomous and self-governing and self-propagating in 1998, the US missionaries left. This was a difficult time in the history of the denomination. While being cut loose from the Mission, was a major blow for the denomination. The local pastors become responsibility for the church, without any assists from outside. Rev. James S. Park, a PCA missionary, came from USA to the country in 1987 and worked hard on outreach evangelism until 1997. The Imani Church, Tumaini Church and Upendo Church were planted under his leadership. A theological institution known as Grace Bible College also was set up in Nakuru the same year with his assistance and expanded with the help of a missionary named Rev. Kwang-Ho Chung who came from Korea. He is still actively teaching at Grace Bible College and working in AEPC. They both sparked a fire to the AEPC toward evangelism in Kenya and mission in the neighboring countries.

In 1990 AEPC sent Rev. Daniel Mathuva, Rev. Richard Kimanzi and Rev. David Kimathi to evangelise in Meru, Mombasa and Embu. In 1996 the denomination was able to create 2 Presbyteries, Mwingi and Central Presbytery. This led to the formation of the General Assembly. The Africa Evangelical Presbyterian Church has also close relations with the Orthodox Presbyterian Church (United States). The denomination had 56 congregations and 10,000 members in the early 2000s. The Grace Bible College in Nakuru exist to train pastors and the other training location is Trinity Bible Institute in Muruu.

=== Development ===
The church grew to 5 Presbyteries in 2010. Africa Evangelical Presbyterian Church got connected to Zimbabwe which became another Presbytery in 2011. In the Democratic Republic of Congo, four churches requested to form a Presbytery and register the denomination in the Republic of Congo, and buy a plot for the mother denomination. The General Assembly visited these congregations in October 2011.

The church also sent missionaries to Meru, Mombasa, and Embu in Kenya.

=== Recent history ===
In April 2012 the Church celebrated its 50th anniversary. A national headquarters was started to be built in Kenya on land donated by the Community Presbyterian Church in Madaraka District and the construction offerings of 200,000 Kenya shillings donated by Rev. James S. Park in 1997.

Today AEPC has grown to 105 churches and six Presbyteries. No longer restricted to Mwingi District, Africa Evangelical Presbyterian congregations can be found from Mombasa on the Indian Ocean to Nakuru in the Rift Valley. Thirteen churches in the Democratic Republic of Congo and Burundi associated themselves with the Evangelical Presbyterian Church and several churches were started in Tanzania and the Bulawayo Presbytery with three churches were created in Zimbabwe. The English Bible was translated into two of the major languages in Kenya, Swahili and Kikamba.

Several church starts were established for example in Ruaka, Kenya and Kibera, Kenya.

== Theology and doctrine ==
Africa Evangelical Presbyterian Church is a conservative Reformed church, which subscribes to the historic Presbyterian government and confessions like:

=== Creeds ===
- Apostles' Creed

=== Confessions ===
- Westminster Confession of Faith (1647)
- Westminster Shorter Catechism
- Westminster Larger Catechism

== Seminary and education ==
There are 3 affiliated educational institutes, these are :

- Grace Bible College in Nakuru, Kenya - this institution is for students came from West and Central Kenya.
- Trinity Bible Institute - this institution is for students came from Nairobi and South Kenya.
- Covenant College of Theological Studies and Leadership - this institution is for all students especially those from East Kenya; started with the help of Rev. John Barber, a minister in the Presbyterian Church in America.

The church has a medical center, the Tel Wa Yesu Hospital, and runs several primary schools.

== Church government ==
The Africa Evangelical Presbyterian Church has a Presbyterian church government, with the Session, Presbyteries and the highest court is the General Assembly.

== Interchurch relations ==
The Africa Evangelical Presbyterian Church is a denominational member of the World Reformed Fellowship which is a theologically orthodox organisation in which Reformed, Presbyterian, Reformed Baptist, and Reformed Anglican denominations can participate.

The WRF subscribes the Westminster Confession, the Gallican Confession, the 39 articles, the Heidelberg Catechism, the Belgic Confession, Savoy Declaration, Second London Baptist Confession of Faith and the Second Helvetic Confession of Faith.

The church has relationship with the Orthodox Presbyterian Church and the Presbyterian Church in Korea (HapDong) as well as the Presbyterian Church in America, through Mission to the World. Two AEPC representatives were present in the PCA 40th General Assembly in Louisville, Kentucky one of them is the current moderator of the Africa Evangelical Presbyterian Church.

The Reformed Churches in the Netherlands (Liberated) financially supports the Trinity Bible Institute.
