= Engleside Hotel =

Historic hotel in Beach Haven, New Jersey

Coordinates: 39.5609°N 74.2371°W

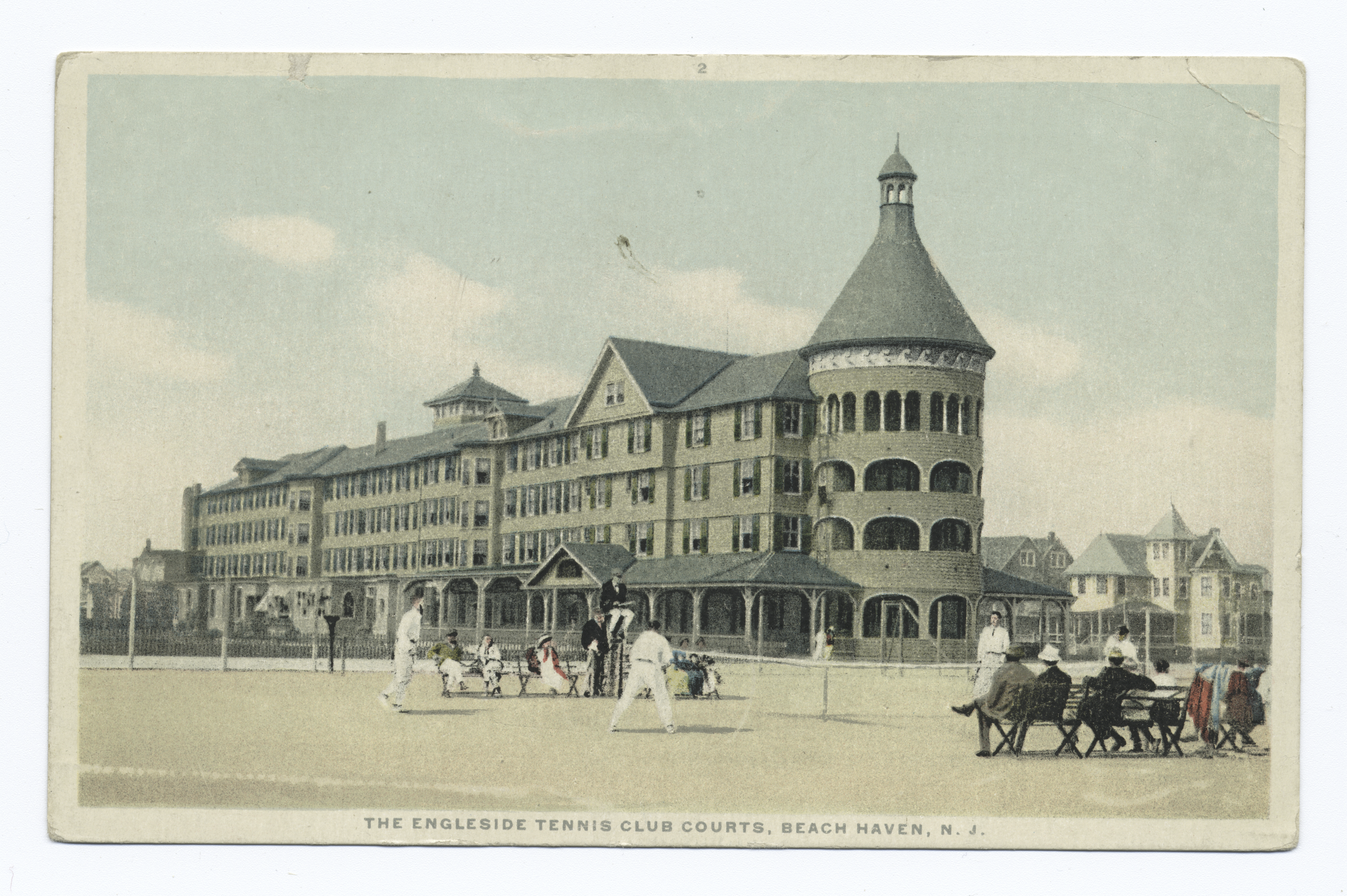
Hotel and tennis court

Engleside Hotel

Engleside Hotel was one of the most decorative and beautiful Victorian hotels that once stood on Engleside Avenue in Beach Haven (located on the southern end of Long Beach Island), New Jersey, United States. It was completed by the start of the 1876 summer season, under the leadership of Robert Engle, and it quickly became one of the most popular resorts on Long Beach Island, along with the Baldwin Hotel located nearby.

The hotel was torn down during WWII, and architectural pieces were auctioned off. The stained glass windows from the dining room were purchased by the director of Harvey Cedars Bible Conference (on the north end of the island, formerly the historic Harvey Cedars Hotel, followed by Camp Whelen), and used in their chapel for many years; eventually removed due to damage by consistent high wind.

The original location of the hotel is a block away from the current Engleside Hotel, and is now the home of a memorial park.

The new Engleside Hotel was rebuilt on the oceanfront of Engleside Avenue in Beach Haven, NJ, and is open year-round as a resort, located near the Sea Shell Resort and The Gables Hotel.

The site is also known for the Jersey Shore shark attacks of 1916. Charles Vansant was killed while staying at the Engleside at the time.
