= Missio Seminary =

Christian seminary

Coordinates: 40.2816°N 75.3038°W

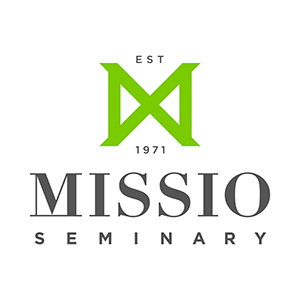
- Former names: Biblical Theological Seminary
- Motto: Following Jesus into the world
- Type: Private seminary
- Established: 1971
- Affiliations: Middle States Commission on Higher Education; Association of Theological Schools in the United States and Canada
- Religious affiliation: Interdenominational Christian
- President: Clarence E. Wright
- Students: 19 (2024)
- Location: Philadelphia, Pennsylvania, United States
- Colors: Green; grey
- Website: missio.edu

Missio Seminary is an interdenominational Evangelical Christian seminary in Philadelphia, Pennsylvania. The seminary was previously known as Biblical Theological Seminary but changed to its current name in 2018. It is located on the site of Sharon Baptist Church.

== History ==
Missio Seminary was founded in 1971 as the Biblical School of Theology by Jack W. Murray, president of Bible Evangelism, Inc., and founder of the now-closed Clearwater Christian College, and Allan A. MacRae, a former president of Faith Theological Seminary, who served as the seminary's first president. The former E.B. Laudenslager public school in Hatfield, Pennsylvania, was renovated to house the new school. In 1978, the name was changed to Biblical Theological Seminary.

Frank A. James III was inaugurated as Biblical's fourth president in 2013. James previously served as provost of Gordon-Conwell Theological Seminary and president of Reformed Theological Seminary.

In October 2018, the seminary announced that it would rename itself from Biblical Theological Seminary to Missio Seminary. In 2019, the seminary moved from its location in Hatfield to Center City, Philadelphia. The move was complete by 2020. In February 2023, the college announced a potential partnership with Kairos University.

In July 2023, James retired from his role as President. The board appointed Clarence E. Wright to serve as the seminary's fifth president and first African-American president. Wright graduated from Missio (then Biblical Theological Seminary) with an M.A. in 2016 and M.Div. in 2017 and had served as a faculty member since 2020.

== Academics ==
The seminary received regional accreditation from the Middle States Association of Colleges and Schools in 1990 and from the Association of Theological Schools in the United States and Canada in 1996.

The seminary offers the Master of Arts (MA), Master of Divinity (M.Div.), Master of Theology (Th.M.), and Doctor of Ministry (D.Min.) degrees. Certificate programs are also offered, as well as online courses.

In addition to the school's regular full-time and part-time faculty, various prominent scholars have served as visiting professors or adjunct faculty, including Scot McKnight, D. A. Carson, Timothy Keller, and Peter Enns.

== Notable alumni ==
- Paul C. H. Lim, Professor of Vanderbilt University
