= New Vietnam =

- Opened: Never opened
- Theme: Vietnam War

New Vietnam was a theme park proposed to be built near Cape Canaveral in the mid-1970s, by evangelist Carl McIntire and Giles Pace, a former Green Beret. It was intended to simulate what the Vietnam War was like during the height of fighting, featuring actors shooting blanks.
