= Robert T. Ketcham =

American pastor

Robert Thomas Ketcham (July 22, 1889 – August 21, 1978) was a Baptist pastor, a leader of separationist fundamentalism, and a founder of the General Association of Regular Baptist Churches.

== Youth ==
Robert Ketcham was born in Tioga County, Pennsylvania, USA, to Charles O. and Sarah Bullock Ketcham, active members of the local Methodist Church. Charles was a small farmer and milkman. Sarah Ketcham died when Robert was seven, and his father married a widow, Louise Elliot. Because Louise was a Baptist, the family then joined the Baptist church. When Robert was eleven, the family moved a little over twenty miles west to Galeton, Pennsylvania.

== Early ministry ==
At sixteen, Robert, a stubborn young man who disliked his parents' discipline, quit high school and left home. Nevertheless, in 1910 he was converted at the Galeton Baptist Church and, despite his lack of formal education, was called in 1912 to pastor the tiny First Baptist Church, Roulette, Pennsylvania, on the Allegheny River. There were thirty-three members in the church, twenty-eight of them women.

Roulette was a village, but its religious and political demographics were unusual. For instance, the town had many Seventh-day Adventists and Spiritualists, and the majority of its voters were socialists—socialist presidential candidate Eugene V. Debs had even spoken there. Ketcham, who was studious by inclination, read extensively to understand and refute these opposing ideologies. He also began taking a correspondence course from Crozer Theological Seminary but gave it up during his second year when he detected theological liberalism in an assigned text.

Meanwhile, Ketcham's eyesight began to fail with keratoconus. Although he could read with a book pressed almost to his nose, he began to memorize scripture so as not to call attention to his loss of sight while in the pulpit. After one service, a deacon dryly told him that he had read the scripture flawlessly while holding the Bible upside down. Ketcham was virtually blind for most of his career although he continued to read printed material with a magnifying glass and in the pulpit used rudimentary notes written in very large letters on black paper with a white grease pencil.

Ketcham's pastorate in Roulette was extremely successful, and many converts were added to the church. During an evangelistic campaign in 1914, four hundred people made professions of faith, about the same number as the population of the town. In 1915, Ketcham was reluctantly ordained by a local Baptist council despite his fundamentalist beliefs and lack of formal education. The same year he accepted the call to the Baptist church of Brookeville, Pennsylvania, where he contracted influenza during the pandemic of 1918.

== Fundamentalist leader ==
In 1919, Ketcham became pastor of the First Baptist Church of Butler, Pennsylvania, where he became more active in defense of orthodox Christianity especially by opposing liberal tendencies in the Northern Baptist Convention. When the convention launched a "New World Movement" to create a "civilization Christian in spirit," Ketcham wrote a pamphlet with the unpromising title, "A Statement of the First Baptist Church Butler, Pennsylvania, with Reference to The New World Movement and the $100,000,000 Drive (1919)." Soon after the pamphlet was published, Ketcham received a visit from officers of the Pittsburgh Baptist Association, who made it clear that if Ketcham did not retract the pamphlet, he would never get another pastorate in the Northern Baptist Convention; one member of the committee shook Ketcham by the collar and "roared that Ketchan owed God an apology." Leading fundamentalist William Bell Riley, pastor of the First Baptist Church, Minneapolis, saw the pamphlet and ordered 20,000 copies. The essay was widely distributed and it "established the young pastor as an articulate spokesman for Fundamentalism."

Shortly thereafter, his wife, Clara, died of tuberculosis, leaving him with the care of two young daughters. In 1922, Ketcham married Mary Smart of Lock Haven, Pennsylvania, and this marriage endured for more than fifty years.

For their honeymoon, Ketcham took his new wife to the annual meeting of the National Baptist Convention, where for twelve years, he and other fundamentalists in the Northern Baptist Convention unsuccessfully attempted to wrest control of the organization from moderates and liberals. In 1923, the conservatives formed the Baptist Bible Union, an unsuccessful attempt to unite fundamentalist Baptists, and Ketcham became a member of the executive committee. The same year, Ketcham also moved to Ohio to pastor successively Baptist churches in Niles and Elyria.

== General Association of Regular Baptist Churches ==
Although Ketcham did not attend the first meeting of the General Association of Regular Baptist Churches (GARBC) in 1932, he was elected vice-president in 1933 and president in 1934. Ketcham successfully campaigned for a looser fellowship of churches rather than a reestablishment of the boards and agencies of the Northern Baptist Convention. He also successfully insisted that membership in the GARBC be open only to churches who first severed their ties with the convention.

By this time Ketcham had assumed the pastorate of the Central Baptist Church of Gary, Indiana, and in 1934 he pulled the church out of the Northern Baptist Convention by emphasizing its ties to both religious and political liberalism.

Ketcham served as president of the GARBC from 1934 to 1938 and then restructured the organization to place control in a Council of 14. Nevertheless, "for the next 30 years, he shaped the General Association of Regular Baptist Churches" says J. Gordon Melton. He served as national representative of the association from 1946 to 1960, and he edited the denominational organ, The Baptist Bulletin (1938–1945, 1946–1955) while pastoring the Walnut Street Baptist Church of Waterloo, Iowa, the largest Baptist Church in the state. In 1944, Ketcham was elected president of the fundamentalist American Council of Christian Churches, which he believed might be an effective counter to the Federal Council of Churches of Christ (later the National Council of Churches), which claimed to speak for all of Protestant Christianity in the United States.

During the 1930s and '40s, Ketcham was dogged by repeated attacks from J. Frank Norris, an influential fundamentalist from Texas with a reputation for making vicious personal assaults. Norris was miffed that he had not been allowed to join the GARBC, which Ketcham and other leaders thought he might try to manipulate for the benefit of his own programs and eccentric personality. In the pages of his Fundamentalist, Norris even attacked Ketcham's daughter, Lois Moffat, for having left the mission field, although she had arrived in the United States near death and remained hospitalized and gravely ill for months. Eventually Ketcham's Waterloo church offered to put all its resources at his disposal so that he could sue Norris for libel and slander. Ketcham replied, "I cannot take a man into court whom I have been taking to the court of high Heaven now for several years."

== Decline and death ==
In 1959 Ketcham had a major heart attack and nearly died. Both his physical strength and his eyesight continued to decline. He preached less frequently through the 1960s, sometimes while sitting on a stool. One of his last messages was given in February 1974. In both 1976 and 1978, he had severe strokes, the latter of which limited his mobility and left him without the ability to speak. Ketcham died on August 20, 1978.

== Personality ==
Because of his fearlessness in defending his fundamentalist beliefs, Ketcham was sometimes called "Fighting Bob," a name he "disliked intensely." His personality was actually irenic, and his son later said that when Ketcham believed that he had no choice but to fight, he would literally cry himself to sleep. Although he refused to maintain any connection with religious liberals, whom he believed had deprecated Jesus Christ, Ketcham maintained friendly relations with other evangelicals with whom he had serious differences. For instance, in 1954, Alan Redpath, pastor of Moody Memorial Church, issued a statement declaring that liberals and fundamentalists should unite "in one great army for Christ." Ketcham was horrified, but he conducted a respectful written exchange with Redpath for almost five years, concluding with the statement, "Forget me as a critic Brother Redpath, and think of me only as a brother in Christ pleading with you to pull away from these entangling alliances before you wind up with Jehoshaphat." Although evangelist Percy Crawford generally disliked fundamentalists who directed attacks at other believers, he and Ketcham developed a lifelong "friendship and mutual affection," in part because Ketcham had "an unassuming manner" and a "fun-loving spirit." In the 1960s Ketcham pleaded with his long-time friend Carl McIntire to "be more gracious in his dealings with other Christians," although McIntire instead used his Christian Beacon to attack members of the General Association of Regular Baptist Churches.

== Publications ==
- I Shall Not Want: An Exposition Of Psalm Twenty-Three (Chicago: Moody Press, 1953)
- Balm in Gilead (Chicago, Illinois, 1959)
- Old Testament Pictures Of New Testament Truth (Des Plaines, Illinois: Regular Baptist Press, 1965)
- The Answer (Des Plaines, Illinois: General Association of Regular Baptist Churches, 1965)
- Sermons (Des Plaines, Illinois: Regular Baptist Press, 1966)
- God's Provision for Normal Christian Living (Schaumburg, Illinois: Regular Baptist Press, 1977).
- The Necessity for the Formation of the General Association of Regular Baptist Churches
- What is the General Association of Regular Baptist Churches?
