= Clearwater Christian College =

Christian college in Clearwater, Florida (1966–2015)

- Motto: Animos et spirito parati
- Motto in English: Prepared in mind and soul
- Type: Private
- Established: 1966
- Affiliations: NCCAA
- Endowment: $389,000
- President: Jack Klem
- Founder: Arthur E. Steele
- Location: Clearwater, Florida, United States; 27.964°N 82.697°W
- Colors: Maroon and Silver
- Mascot: Cougar
- Website: www.clearwater.edu

Clearwater Christian College (CCC) was a non-denominational Christian college in Clearwater, Florida, United States, from 1966 until 2015.

== History ==
In July 1965, Arthur E. Steele went to Florida looking for a place to found a Christian college, as a reaction to what the founders saw as trends in evangelical colleges away from biblical standards of morality. The school would emphasize doctrine and personal soul-winning, and was a reaction against the ecumenical movement, new evangelicalism, and ecumenical evangelism. Jack Murray supported the founding as chairman of the Advisory Council. These two founders were both graduates of Faith Theological Seminary, and had each served as a president of Shelton College. Steele chose to found the college in Clearwater, and soon acquired 50 acres (200,000 m^{2}) waterfront at the eastern entrance of Clearwater. On September 17, 1966, the college officially opened with 15 students enrolled.

Clearwater Christian College received full accreditation from the Southern Association of Colleges and Schools in December 1984 and in 1998 gained reaffirmation for accreditation.

In January 1987, the Board of Directors named George D. Youstra to succeed Steele as president. In the following years, enrollment tripled, new buildings were added, 89 additional acres of property were acquired, and new programs were offered.

In May 2002, Richard A. Stratton assumed the presidency.

In the summer of 2008, the College began its first graduate program in the area of Educational Leadership, and the Florida Department of Education granted full approval for Elementary Education graduates to be certified with a reading endorsement.

On May 7, 2012, John F. Klem became the fifth president of Clearwater Christian College. However, the economic downturn across America caused student enrollment to drop significantly.

On June 5, 2015, the board of directors of the College announced the closure of Clearwater Christian College effective immediately, citing "ongoing struggles with maintaining enrollment, rising costs, and challenging development efforts" as reasons for the decision.

== Academics ==
CCC was known as a Christ-centered liberal arts college with a general education curriculum in the arts and sciences plus an embedded Bible minor for all students.

Clearwater Christian College had an agreement with the nearby University of South Florida (USF) to offer its students ROTC programs in Army, Navy, Air Force, and Marines.

=== Study abroad ===
In the final years of operation, the college offered study abroad trips for college credit during spring break and summer break to Austria, Costa Rica, England, France, Greece, Ireland, Israel, Italy, Scotland, and Wales. As a faith-based institution committed to serving God, CCC sponsored missions trips to international locations. Faculty, staff, and students ministered across the globe in Argentina, Brazil, China, Jamaica, Mexico, the Philippines, South Africa, Turkey, and Thailand.

== Beliefs ==
Clearwater Christian College was a denominationally unaffiliated Christian college; however most of their faculty, staff, and students came from various Baptist and independent Bible church backgrounds. The college's doctrinal statement focused on the historic fundamentals of Protestant Christianity.

Students were required to attend Sunday services, chapel services, and spend time in Christian service. Small group, student-led devotional times occurred twice a week for prayer and peer edification, for all resident students.

Clearwater was conservative and maintained student guidelines including a modest dress code, regulation of facial hair, limited physical contact between the sexes, and chapel attendance three times per week. Student rooms were inspected weekly for cleanliness, and a "white glove" inspection was performed once a semester.

== Athletics ==
The CCC intercollegiate athletics teams, known as the Cougars, participated in the National Christian College Athletic Association (NCCAA) Division II. The women's volleyball team won 13 national titles, including eight in a row during 2006-2013. The men's soccer team also won back-to-back national titles in 2009 and 2010. The women's soccer team won the 2012 and 2014 national title.
