= Nelson Graves =

American cricketer (1880–1918)

Nelson Graves Jr.
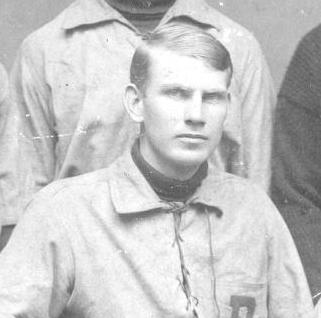
- Graves in 1902

Personal information
- Full name: Nelson Zwinglius Graves Jr.
- Born: August 10, 1880; Philadelphia, Pennsylvania, U.S.
- Died: March 31, 1918 (aged 37); Germantown, Pennsylvania, U.S.
- Batting: Right-handed

Career statistics
Competition	First-class
Matches	34
Runs scored	1,133
Batting average	18.57
100s/50s	1/4
Top score	103*
Balls bowled	72
Wickets	1
Bowling average	57.00
5 wickets in innings	0
10 wickets in match	0
Best bowling	1/13
Catches/stumpings	22/0
- Source: CricketArchive, April 15, 2021

Nelson Zwinglius Graves Jr. (August 10, 1880 – March 31, 1918) was an American cricketer who played 34 first-class matches as a member of the Philadelphian cricket team.

== Early life and education ==
Graves was born August 10, 1880, in Philadelphia, to Nelson Z. Graves and Ida Johnson Graves. He and his family resided in an estate in the Germantown neighborhood of Philadelphia at Manheim Street and Wissahickon Avenue. He was a member of the Germantown Cricket Club and graduated from the University of Pennsylvania. He played cricket at the University of Pennsylvania and played in several series against touring English sides.

== Cricket career ==
Graves began his first-class career at the age of 14 for the Gentlemen of Philadelphia on September 14, 1894. This match was played on the Germantown Cricket Club ground against a team of Players of United States of America. Graves scored no runs in the two-day match which ended in a draw.

Four years later, Graves again played with the Philadelphians, this time against Sir Pelham Warner's touring side. This time he was one of the opening batsmen, though his performance in the loss still left something to be desired.

He joined the Philadelphian cricket team in England in 1903. It was against Lancashire on July 6 of that year that Graves reached his highest run total. In the first innings at Old Trafford, he made only 19 runs but in the second he helped the Philadelphians to their nine wicket victory with a 103 not out. This score took 105 minutes to achieve and included 9 fours. His second highest first-class score came a month earlier against Nottinghamshire with a 62 not out. His highest recorded scores came during non-first class matches. One came during a match against Scotland on the same tour. This match saw Graves reach a score of 107. In 1898 he hit 128 against Canada.

Graves continued his international career during a tour of the Marylebone Cricket Club in the United States. The side played two matches against the Philadelphians in 1905. He also joined the Philadelphian tour of England in 1908. In his last first-class match against Kent County Cricket Club on August 27, Graves only managed 7 runs in the first innings and 4 in the second.

== Business career ==
Graves worked in his father's paint varnish business, N. Z. Graves Inc., as a director, head of purchasing, and management of all factories. He was a director of the Cape May Hotel Company, the Greater Cape May Real Estate Company, the Realty Corporation of Cape May, and the Wildwood Harbor Company. He also served as secretary for the Tecopa Consolidated Mining Company.

Graves died of meningitis on March 31, 1918, and was interred at West Laurel Hill Cemetery in Bala Cynwyd, Pennsylvania.

== Personal life ==
He was married and had four children.
