= Richard Stratton (college president) =

Richard A. Stratton (born 1958) became president of Clearwater Christian College in 2002. Previously he was the Dean of the School of Business at Bob Jones University. On January 31, 2011, Stratton announced his resignation from Clearwater effective at the end of 2011, though he continued in his post as president until May 2012. He is now starting a new position in Greenville, South Carolina as the associate pastor of Heritage Bible Church.

Stratton graduated from Bob Jones University in 1980, and received a PhD in Business in 1994 from the University of Georgia.
