= Arthur Glasser =

American missionary and educator (1914-2009)

Arthur Frederick Glasser (September 10, 1914 – December 8, 2009) was a missiologist and missionary who taught at Fuller Theological Seminary, last serving as Dean Emeritus of the School of Intercultural Studies. He also completed five years of missionary service in China.

== Early life and education ==
Glasser was born in Paterson, New Jersey in 1914, and attended public schools as well as the Augusta Military Academy. He was raised as a mainline Presbyterian, but in 1932 he experienced a religious conversion to evangelical Christianity at the American Keswick conference in New Jersey that changed the trajectory of his life and vocation.

Glasser graduated from Cornell University in 1936, Moody Bible Institute in 1939, and Faith Theological Seminary in 1942. Later he would receive a Doctor of Divinity from Covenant Theological Seminary (1966) and an S.T.M. (Master of Theology) from Union Seminary in New York City (1970). He worked as an engineer at the Dravo Corporation for several years in the 1930s, and then served as a U.S. Navy chaplain attached to the U.S. Marines during World War II.

In 1942 he married Alice Oliver, and together they had three children.

== Career and ministry ==
He served in China with the China Inland Mission from 1945 to 1951 and saw the organization undergo major changes as the Chinese government changed and missionaries were expelled. He served as North American Director for almost fifteen years. During this time period is also taught at Columbia Bible College and Westminster Theological Seminary. He was Home Director of the Overseas Missionary Fellowship until 1970, and then Dean of the School of World Missions at Fuller Theological Seminary. In 1980 he retired, but continued to teach and mentor students until 1999 when he moved to Seattle.

Glasser served many years as editor of the Missiology journal and then president of the American Society of Missiology, and was actively involved in Jewish evangelism efforts. He was one of the pioneers of the academic discipline of missiology.

In 2003 Glasser wrote his magnum opus, Announcing the Kingdom: The Story of God's Mission in the Bible which portrays missionary work as a central component of Christianity. Despite his emphasis on missions and the uniqueness of Christ for salvation, his open ended treatment of Acts 10 and 17 has led some reviewers to question his views on universalism, while others expressed concern over Glasser's emphasis on evangelistic outreach to the Jewish community.

== Death ==
Glasser died on December 8, 2009 in Seattle, Washington.

== Publications ==
- Glasser, Arthur F. (1946). And Some Believed: A Chaplain's Experiences with the Marines in the South Pacific. Moody Press – via Open Library.
- Fife, Eric S.; Glasser, Arthur F. (1961). Missions in Crisis: Rethinking Missionary Strategy. InterVarsity Press – via Internet Archive.
- Glasser, Arthur F. (1976). Crucial Dimensions in World Evangelization. William Carey Library – via Internet Archive.
- Glasser, Arthur F.; McGavran, Donald (1983). Contemporary Theologies of Mission. Baker Book House – via Internet Archive.
- Glasser, Arthur F. (1990). Spiritual Conflict: 6 Studies for Individuals or Groups. InterVarsity Press – via Internet Archive.
- Glasser, Arthur F. (2003). Announcing the Kingdom: The Story of God’s Mission in the Bible. Baker Academic – via Internet Archive.
