= Nelson Z. Graves =

American businessman (1849–1930)

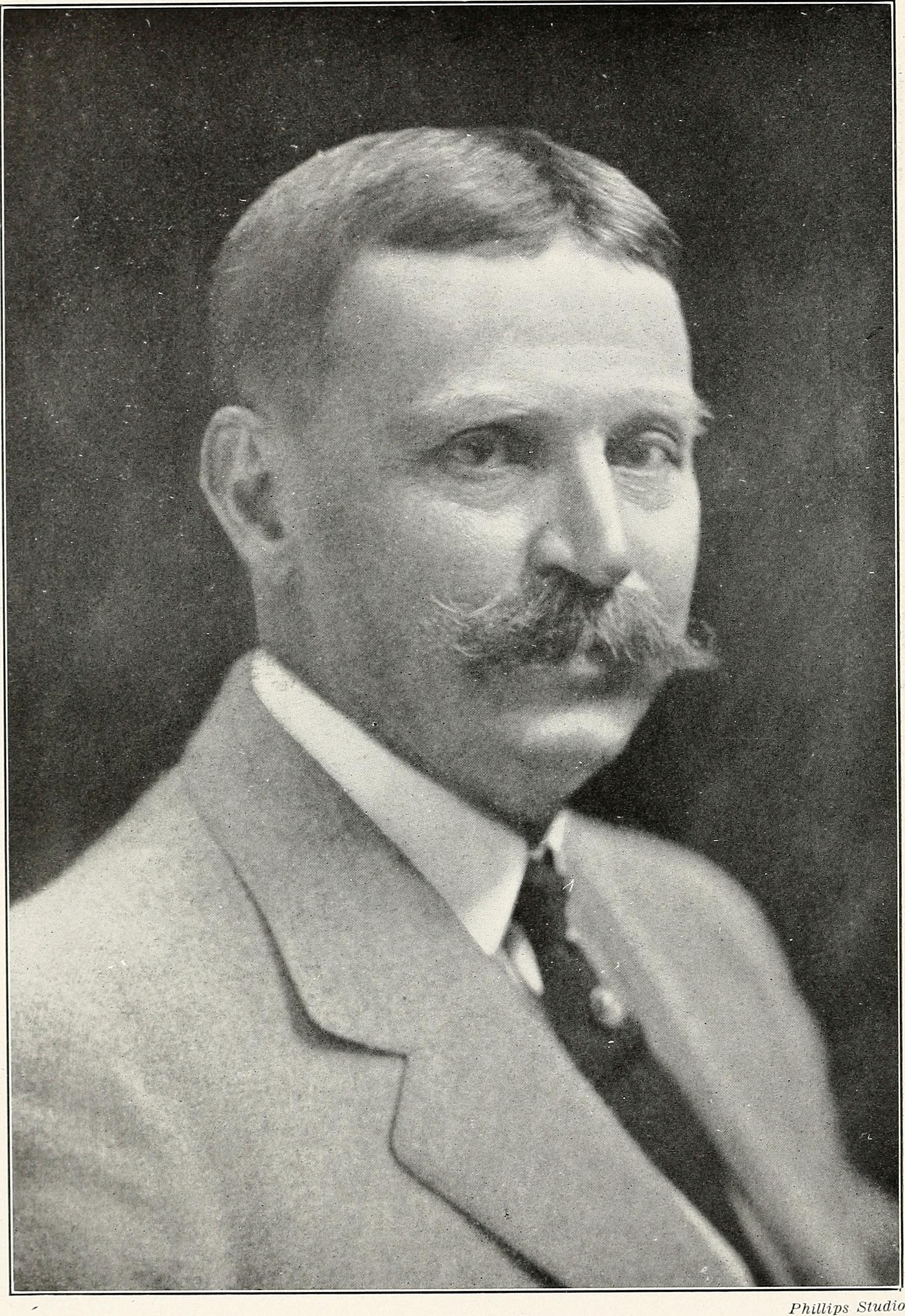
- Born: August 25, 1849; Clinton, North Carolina, U.S.
- Died: December 6, 1930 (aged 81)
- Resting place: West Laurel Hill Cemetery, Bala Cynwyd, Pennsylvania, U.S.
- Education: Middlebury College
- Occupations: Paint manufacturer, banker
- Spouse: Ida C. Johnson
- Children: Ferdinand J. Graves; Nelson Graves; Lottie Graves

Nelson Zwinglius Graves (August 24, 1849–December, 6, 1930) was an American businessman and real estate developer. He was the founder of the N.Z. Graves, Inc. paint and varnish company, and president of Camden White Lead Works and Tecopa Consolidated Mining Company. He led the Cape May Real Estate Company, and played a major role in the development of Cape May, New Jersey, including investments in the Hotel Cape May and the Cape May, Delaware Bay, and Sewell's Point Railroad.

== Early life and education ==
Graves was born August 24, 1849, in Clinton, North Carolina, to Charlotte Katurah Handy and Luke C. Graves. He attended Davidson College in Davidson, North Carolina, for two years and graduated from Middlebury College in Middlebury, Vermont, in 1868. He worked as a professor of languages at a school in Ellicott City, Maryland, and attended Columbia Law School, but left before graduation to enter business.

== Career ==
Graves began to manufacture varnish and japan in 1882, and incorporated the N. Z. Graves Company in Philadelphia in 1888. He served as president of Camden White Lead Works and Tecopa Consolidated Mining Company as well as director of Merchants' National Bank in Philadelphia. By 1906, Graves was wealthy enough that when the Presbyterian church that he had attended in North Carolina as a young man burnt down, he donated a new church building to the congregation and had it named after his father.

He was a member of the Fairmount Park Art Association, the Board of Trade, and the Philadelphia Bourse.

=== Cape May development ===
In 1897, Graves purchased a vacation home in Cape May, New Jersey. He lived there in the summer and became committed to investing in the development of Cape May as a resort town. In 1910, Graves purchased the Cape May Light and Power Company. In 1911 Graves took over the Cape May Real Estate Company, a financially troubled effort to develop Cape May into a resort community.

The Hotel Cape May opened in 1908 but had not been successful enough to pay back its enormous construction cost overruns, and lots nearby were largely unsold. Graves led the Cape May Real Estate Company that purchased the hotel and property. Graves purchased a dredge ship to deepen the Cape May harbor to facilitate development. He founded a large farming operation called the Cape May Farmstead to provide produce, eggs, and milk to the hotel.

He was able to build some homes in the development. In 1912, Graves built a home in East Cape May in the Spanish Mission architectural style, designed by architect Lloyd Titus. He had experienced the Spanish Mission architecture while out West for the purchase of a lead mine. It was built as an example of new homes that could be built in the East end of town to differentiate them from the Victorian architecture prevalent in West Cape May. However he went bankrupt during construction and the home was sold and later used as The Mission Inn, a bed and breakfast.

He built the Cape May Casino which was later turned into the Cape May Playhouse. He built an amusement park named the Fun Factory in 1913, It was closed in 1917 and sold to the United States Coast Guard and is today the United States Coast Guard Training Center Cape May. Graves also controlled the Cape May, Delaware Bay, and Sewell's Point Railroad, and an electric street car railroad.

== Family and death ==
Graves married Ida C. Johnson on April 22, 1874, and together they had three children: Nelson Z. Graves, Jr., Ferdinand J. Graves, and Lottie Graves. Nelson Jr. was an international cricket player. Both Nelson Jr. and Ferdinand were involved in the family paint and varnish business.

Graves died December 6, 1930, at his home in the Germantown neighborhood of Philadelphia. He was interred in West Laurel Hill Cemetery in Bala Cynwyd, Pennsylvania.
