= J. Oliver Buswell =

American minister and college administrator (1895–1977)

James Oliver Buswell
- Born: January 16, 1895; Burlington, Wisconsin
- Died: February 4, 1977 (aged 82)
- Occupation: Theological college president

Academic background
- Education: University of Minnesota, McCormick Theological Seminary, University of Chicago
- Alma mater: New York University (PhD)
- Thesis: The Philosophies of F. R. Tennant and John Dewey (1949)

Academic work
- Discipline: Biblical studies and Systematic theology
- Institutions: Wheaton College; National Bible Institute of New York City; Shelton College; Covenant College; Covenant Theological Seminary
- Notable works: A Systematic Theology of the Christian Religion in 2 vols.

James Oliver Buswell Jr. (January 16, 1895 – February 4, 1977) was a Presbyterian theologian, educator and institution builder.

== Education ==
Buswell was born in Burlington, Wisconsin. He received an A.B. from the University of Minnesota (1917), a B.D. from McCormick Theological Seminary (1923), an M.A. from the University of Chicago, and his Ph.D. from New York University (1949).

== Professional life ==
He served as a chaplain in the 140th Infantry during World War I. After pastorates in a Presbyterian church in Milwaukee (1919–1922) and a Reformed church in Brooklyn (1922–26), Buswell served as president of Wheaton College from 1926 to 1940. He then served as president of the National Bible Institute of New York City, and its successor, Shelton College, in Ringwood, New Jersey from 1941 to 1955. And finally, in 1956, he became dean of Covenant College (1956–1964) and Covenant Theological Seminary (1956–1970) in St. Louis, Missouri. The libraries at both Wheaton College and Covenant Theological Seminary were named in his honor, though the Wheaton board of trustees voted in 2023 to remove Buswell's name because of his refusal to admit Black students in the 1930s.

== Tenure as President of Wheaton College ==
In January 1926, the young Rev. Buswell was on the campus of Wheaton College to deliver a week's worth of chapel sermons. Within weeks, college trustees invited Buswell to become Wheaton's third president (and first ever not named Blanchard). He was the youngest college president at 31 years old. Over the next 14 years, Buswell oversaw a significant period of growth in both numbers and academic rigor. He guided the college through the process of accreditation, bolstered its curriculum (especially in the sciences), increased the percentage of full-time faculty with Ph.D.'s from 24% to 49%, and saw the enrollment grow from 400 to 1,100. However, Buswell's staunch Calvinism, fundamentalist separatism and his reportedly difficult temperament made his tenure at Wheaton an uneasy one. After years of contentious relations on campus, the Wheaton board of trustees fired Buswell.

== Doctrinal Distinctives ==
Although not a dispensationalist, he was a premillennialist who believed in what pre-tribulationists call a "mid-tribulation rapture." (Actually, he believed that the Bible term tribulation only applies to the 2nd half of Daniel's 70th week; thus a so-called "mid-tribulationist" may well call himself a "pre-tribulationist.") He authored dozens of articles and eleven books, most notably, A Systematic Theology of the Christian Religion, 2 vols. (1962–63, out-of-print). Peculiar beliefs of Buswell include his theory that Melchizedek was a pre-incarnate appearance of Christ and that God's omnipresence does not mean that His existence extends throughout the universe—one may think of the universe as in God's lap.

== Fundamentalist Churchman ==
Buswell was a staunch Calvinist who held to the Westminster Standards and covenant theology. He was considered a fundamentalist given his firm stand against the modernist accommodation within mainline Protestant denominations and his insistence on holding to the historic fundamentals (basics) of Christian doctrine.

In 1936, he was dismissed from the ministry of the Presbyterian Church in the U.S.A. for the part that he played in the Independent Mission Board controversy, and became a figure in the founding of what would become the Orthodox Presbyterian Church. The following year, he joined another fundamentalist Carl McIntire in forming the Bible Presbyterian Church. He would later participate in the Evangelical Presbyterian Church (formerly the Bible Presbyterian Church, Columbus Synod) and the Reformed Presbyterian Church, Evangelical Synod.

== Personal life ==
Buswell married Helen (née Spaulding) in 1918 and together they had four children, Jane, James III, Ruth, and John. His grandson and namesake was the virtuoso violinist, James O. Buswell IV (Dec. 4, 1946 - Sept. 28, 2021).

== Works ==
=== Thesis ===
- Buswell, James Oliver (1924). The Order of the Material in the Fourth Gospel (MA). University of Chicago, Divinity School. OCLC 44747920.
- Buswell, James Oliver (1949). The Philosophies of F. R. Tennant and John Dewey (PhD). New York University.

=== Books ===
- Buswell, James Oliver (1928). Problems in the Prayer Life: from a pastor's question box. Chicago, IL: Bible Institute Colportage Association. OCLC 4287726.
- ——— (1937). What is God?: the Lamb of God, volume 2. Grand Rapids, MI: Zondervan. OCLC 904355725.
- ——— (1960). A Christian View of Being and Knowing. Grand Rapids, MI: Zondervan. OCLC 808515066.
- ——— (1962). A Systematic Theology of the Christian Religion, in 2 volumes. Grand Rapids, MI: Zondervan. ISBN 978-0-310-22190-6. OCLC 692264631. —originally published in 2 volumes

=== Works by children of J. Oliver Buswell, Jr. ===
Buswell, James Oliver III [12 January 1922 - 8 August 2011]

- ——— (1964). Slavery, Segregation, and Scripture. Grand Rapids, MI: Eerdmans. OCLC 188229.
- ——— (1965). Genesis, the Neolithic, and the antiquity of Adam. St. Louis, MO: Covenant Theological Seminary. OCLC 40837933.

Academic offices
Preceded by Charles A. Blanchard	President of Wheaton College; 1926–1940	Succeeded by V. Raymond Edman
Preceded by Don Odell Shelton	President of Shelton College; 1941–1955	Succeeded by John W. Murray
