= Christian Admiral =

- Interactive map of the Christian Admiral area
- Former names: Hotel Cape May; Admiral Hotel

General information
- Type: Hotel
- Architectural style: Beaux-Arts
- Location: 1401 Beach Avenue, Cape May, Cape May County, NJ, Cape May, New Jersey, United States
- Coordinates: 38.9355°N 74.9010°W
- Construction started: 1905
- Opened: April 11, 1908
- Closed: 1991
- Demolished: February 1996
- Cost: US$1 million
- Owner: Carl McIntire

Other information
- Number of rooms: 333

The Christian Admiral, formerly Admiral Hotel and Hotel Cape May, was a luxury hotel located in Cape May, New Jersey. Demolished in 1996, it was once the world's largest hotel, known for its majestic architecture and association with Carl McIntire's Christian movement.

== History ==
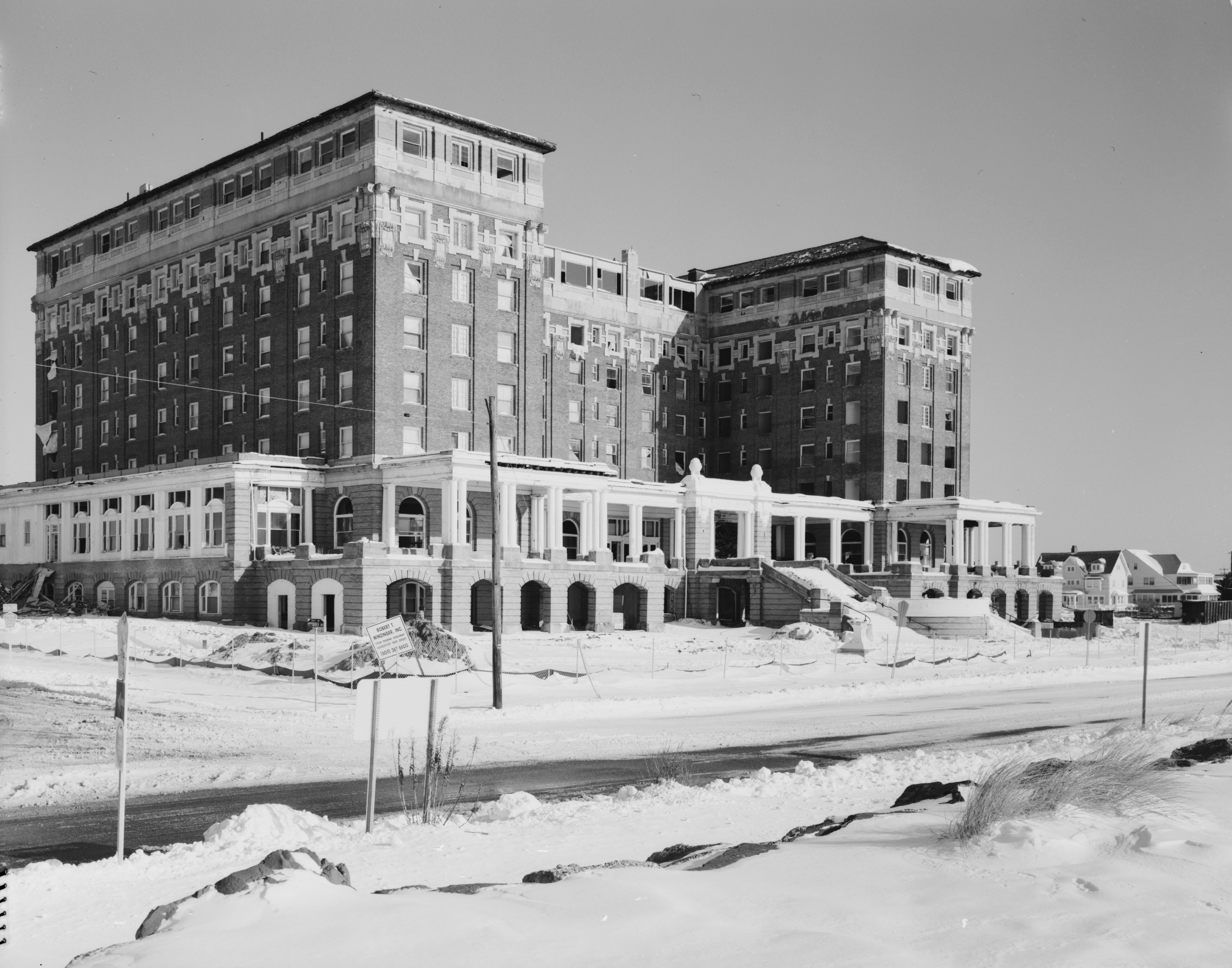
Christian Admiral hotel, under McIntire ownership

The Christian Admiral Hotel, originally known as the Hotel Cape May, was erected in the Beaux-Arts style between 1905 and 1908. When opened on April 11, 1908, it was the world's largest hotel with 333 guest rooms. Completed behind schedule and over budget, Hotel Cape May was part of a development project intended to bring wealthy visitors to the city and rival East Coast resorts such as Newport, Rhode Island. During its existence it would undergo five bankruptcies and ownership changes.

Nelson Z. Graves led the Cape May Real Estate Company to purchase the hotel. He was unsuccessful in making the project profitable, but was able to build a portion of the intended homes, some of which still exist. During World War I, the nearby U.S. Naval base used the hotel as a hospital.

In 1962 the hotel was acquired by the Christian Beacon Press, headed by the Rev. Dr. Carl McIntire, for use as a bible study and conference center. The conference facilities were expanded and substantial sums of money were spent to bring the hotel into compliance with building codes. Carl McIntire said preserving old buildings is American.

In 1991, the hotel was closed by Cape May City officials. The hotel was demolished in 1996 and the site was reused for a development of single family homes. The demolition of the hotel placed the city's National Historic Landmark status at risk.
