= Carl McIntire =

American church pastor and fundamentalist radio minister (1906–2002)

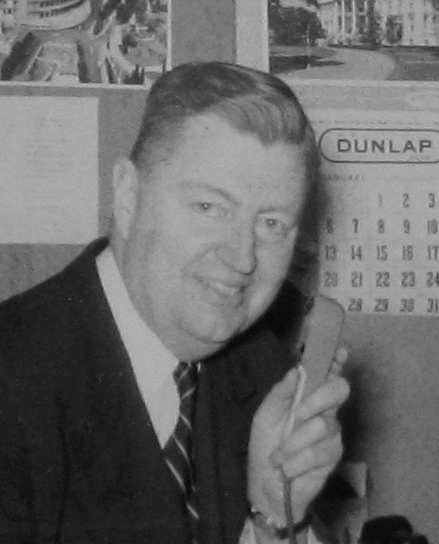
- McIntire in 1957
- Born: May 17, 1906; Ypsilanti, Michigan, U.S.
- Died: March 19, 2002 (aged 95); Collingswood, New Jersey, U.S.
- Resting place: Harleigh Cemetery, Camden, New Jersey
- Education: Park College (BA); Westminster Theological Seminary
- Occupations: clergyman and radio preacher

Charles Curtis McIntire Jr. (May 17, 1906 – March 19, 2002), known as Carl McIntire, was a founder and minister in the Bible Presbyterian Church, founder and long-time president of the International Council of Christian Churches and the American Council of Christian Churches, and a popular religious radio broadcaster, who proudly identified himself as a fundamentalist.

== Youth and education ==
Born in Ypsilanti, Michigan, Carl McIntire was the oldest of four children born to Charles Curtis McIntire, a Presbyterian minister and M.A. graduate of Princeton University, and Hettie Hotchkin McIntire. McIntire's father pastored in Salt Lake City, but by 1912 he had suffered a mental breakdown and was hospitalized. He and his wife were divorced, and she raised the children alone in Durant, Oklahoma, where she served as Dean of Women at Southeastern State Teachers College. Carl McIntire completed high school in Durant and attended Southeastern State, where he became an award-winning intercollegiate debater and president of the student body during his final year. For his senior year, he transferred to Park College, Parkville, Missouri, where he received his B.A. degree before entering Princeton Theological Seminary, New Jersey, in 1928 to prepare for the Presbyterian ministry. Meanwhile, he worked as a janitor and sold maps to farmers door-to-door in Caddo County, Oklahoma.

During the late 1920s, Princeton Seminary was embroiled in the Fundamentalist-Modernist Controversy that had disquieted the Presbyterian Church in the United States of America as well as other Protestant denominations. McIntire became a strong supporter of J. Gresham Machen, a conservative professor of New Testament. With Machen, McIntire opposed a reorganization of the seminary in 1929 that appeared to strengthen liberal elements in the church. He followed his mentor and three other professors from Princeton to the newly founded Westminster Theological Seminary, where he completed his Th.B. degree in 1931.

In May 1931, he married Fairy Eunice Davis of Paris, Texas, whom he had met when they were both students at Southeastern, and who became a high school English teacher while he completed seminary. They had three children. After the death of Fairy Davis McIntire in 1992, McIntire married Alice Goff, a church office administrator with whom he had worked for many years.

== Founding of the Bible Presbyterian Church ==
In 1931, McIntire was ordained into the ministry of the Presbyterian Church USA, serving for two years at Chelsea Presbyterian Church, Atlantic City, New Jersey. In 1933, he was called to the Presbyterian Church of Collingswood, New Jersey, near Philadelphia, the largest church in the West Jersey Presbytery. McIntire remained a resident of Collingswood for the rest of his life. The Women's Missionary Society of the Collingswood church called his attention to what they perceived as a modernist perspective in the missions study book, which had been promoted by the denomination's Board of Foreign Missions. McIntire joined the conservative side in the ongoing Fundamentalist-Modernist debate, and in 1934, at Machen's invitation, he became a founding member of the Independent Board for Presbyterian Foreign Missions, an agency organized as an alternative to the denominational mission board that supported theologically liberal missionaries. Deeming the new board a challenge to its authority, the General Assembly demanded that the clergymen resign. After they refused, Machen, McIntire, and seven other clergymen were tried by an ecclesiastical court in 1935–36. The board members lost, and they renounced the jurisdiction of the Presbyterian Church, as did the Collingswood Presbyterian Church, only a tiny minority of whose members refused to support their young pastor.

In 1936 McIntire joined Machen and others to found the Presbyterian Church of America, later renamed the Orthodox Presbyterian Church. The new church attracted supporters from other Reformed traditions, complicating the church's effort to define itself. A debate soon emerged in the young denomination over eschatology, Presbyterian traditions, the use of alcohol and tobacco, and the place of political activity in the church. McIntire and others left in 1937 to form the Bible Presbyterian Church, which emphasized Fundamentalist distinctives in contrast to continental Reformed positions, supporting political involvement, the Scofield Reference Bible, a premillennialist view of eschatology, and abstinence from the use of tobacco and alcohol.

In April 1938, after the Collingswood church lost a civil suit over control of its church property, the congregation walked out en masse from their impressive Gothic building and followed McIntire to a huge tent erected several blocks east on the main street at Haddon Avenue and Cuthbert Boulevard. In May 1938, the congregation moved into a wooden "Tabernacle," and in November 1957, into a neo-colonial church building with a tall, Wren steeple. The church seated more than a thousand. A Sunday School was constructed on the location of the previous tent, and the revamped Tabernacle became an activity center.

== Expanding ministry ==
=== Christian Beacon ===
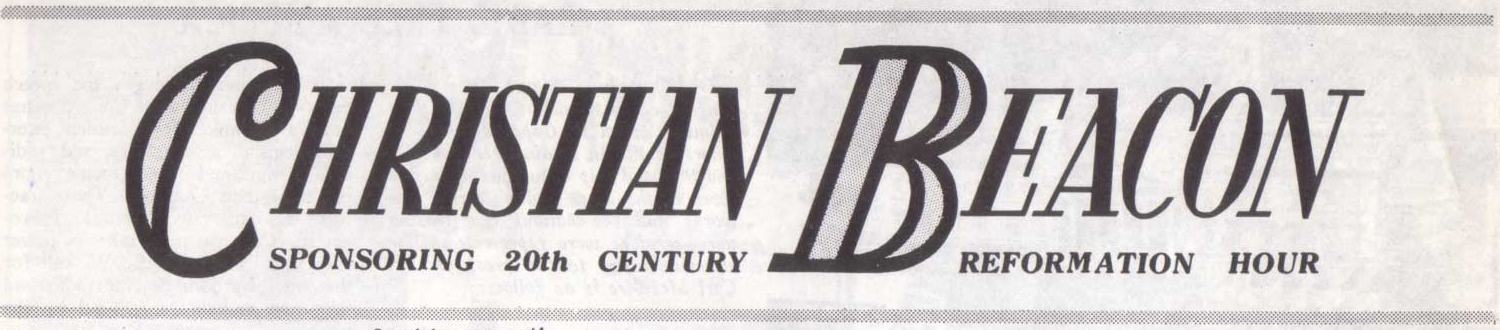
Logo of the Christian Beacon.

In February 1936, during the series of ecclesiastical trials, McIntire launched a weekly newspaper, The Christian Beacon to give greater voice to his message. The Collingswood church had already printed many of his sermons, and its church services had been broadcast over the radio in the Philadelphia region. Over the next four decades, McIntire published twelve books, and hundreds of pamphlets, booklets, sermons, speeches, and documentary portfolios. As Joel Carpenter has written, McIntire was "a gifted publicist," and his Christian Beacon was a "widely read organ of separatist opinion in which McIntire practiced his talent for sensational and aggressive religious journalism."

=== Twentieth-Century Reformation Hour ===
In March 1955, McIntire initiated a daily thirty-minute radio program, The Twentieth Century Reformation Hour, which featured McIntire's commentary on religious and political affairs. The radio program generally began with a homily from the Bible, followed by a monologue by McIntire on a wide range of subjects, including apostasy in mainline churches, liberalism in government, opposition to coexistence with communism, and cultural issues of the moment, including gambling, sex education, socialized medicine, and fluoridation of drinking water. An associate pastor of the Collingswood church, Charles Richter, known to listeners as "Amen Charlie," regularly "amened" his support of McIntire's statements. During the 1960s, the program may have been heard on as many as 600 radio stations—although McIntire's inaccuracy with numbers became legendary. In 1965, McIntire effectively purchased radio station, WXUR, Media, Pennsylvania, although it was formally owned by Faith Theological Seminary.

=== Bible conference centers ===
McIntire's outreach included an interest in promoting summer Bible conferences, a common method of evangelization and Bible teaching among American Protestants during the early twentieth century. In 1941, McIntire took a leading role in acquiring and operating Harvey Cedars Bible Conference on the Jersey shore at Harvey Cedars, New Jersey (1941–56). After the Bible Presbyterian denomination underwent its first split in the latter year, McIntire's organization purchased the historic Admiral Hotel in Cape May, New Jersey in 1962, and founded the Christian Admiral Bible Conference and Freedom Center. McIntire added a number of distressed properties to his holdings, becoming an unwitting preservationist as he prevented outmoded structures—the most notable being the nineteenth-century Windsor and Congress Hall hotels—from being destroyed to make room for motels. The conference itself contributed to the revival of Cape May as a summer resort. In 1971, McIntire also developed a Bible conference in Cape Canaveral, Florida.

=== Church councils ===
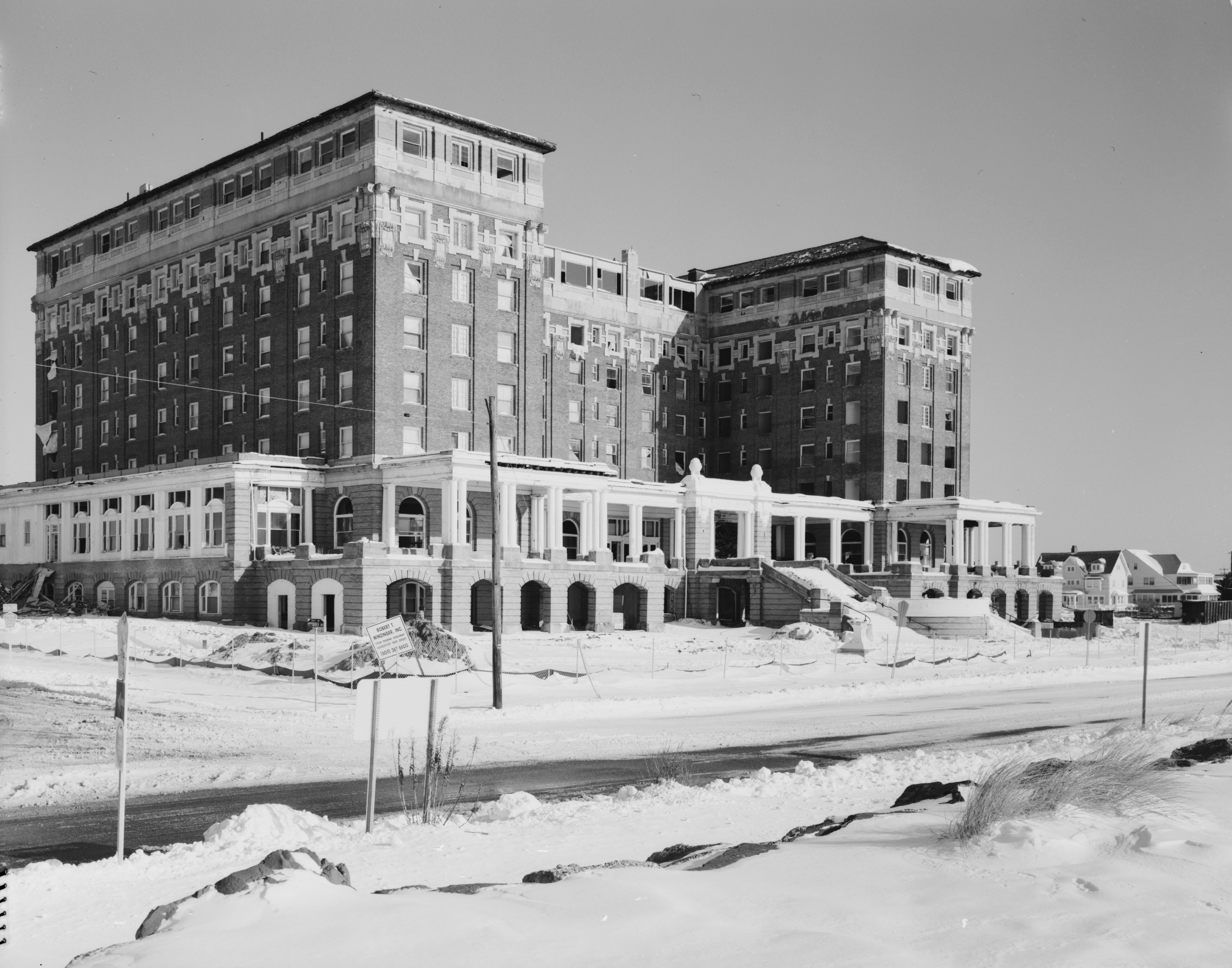
Christian Admiral hotel, home to many Bible conferences, as well as ACCC and ICCC congresses.

During the 1940s, McIntire's influence expanded throughout the United States and overseas. In 1941, he helped create the American Council of Christian Churches (ACCC) as a conservative alternative to the liberal Federal (later, National) Council of Churches (NCC). In 1948, he likewise helped to found the International Council of Christian Churches (ICCC) to challenge the World Council of Churches (WCC). McIntire was elected first President of the ICCC and was reelected at each World Congress until he died. He and his wife, Fairy, traveled around the world scores of times both to encourage evangelical Christians abroad and to demonstrate his opposition to the World Council of Churches. (During McIntire's long presidency, the headquarters of the ICCC were located in Amsterdam, and J. C. Maris served as General Secretary.)

During the late 1960s, McIntire's relationship with the ACCC leadership became strained, and he secretly transferred an ACCC relief agency (along with $62,000) to the ICCC, which remained firmly under his control. McIntire "was perennially late to ACCC meetings, and then he would demand that any decisions made in advance of his arrival be undone." When ACCC leaders refused to accommodate him, he attacked them in the Christian Beacon, claiming that there was a "Baptist plot against him." After being outmaneuvered, McIntire attempted a parliamentary takeover in October 1970, which eventually led to a court order against him in 1971, and a final severing of his relationship with the ACCC.

=== Educational institutions ===
McIntire promoted several educational ministries. The Sunday School and the Summer Bible School of the Collingswood church were large and active. (The Summer Bible School of the Collingswood church—McIntire disliked the term "Vacation Bible School"—ran for four weeks rather than the typical one week of most churches during the period.) McIntire also gained control of the National Bible Institute in New York City and transformed the school into a liberal arts college, Shelton College, which moved to the "Skylands" estate in Ringwood, New Jersey, in 1953. In 1964, the college moved to Cape May, later to Cape Canaveral, Florida, and then back to Cape May before closing in the 1980s after the New Jersey Supreme Court in New Jersey Board of Higher Education v. Shelton College prohibited Shelton from granting academic degrees without a state license. Faith Theological Seminary, organized in 1937 as an independent school associated with the Bible Presbyterian denomination, later occupied Lynnewood Hall, the Gilded Age estate of P.A.B. Widener in Elkins Park, Pennsylvania. McIntire and west coast supporters of the Bible Presbyterian Church founded Highland College in Pasadena, California, a small Christian liberal arts college, and remained associated with the college until 1956.

== Christian emphases ==
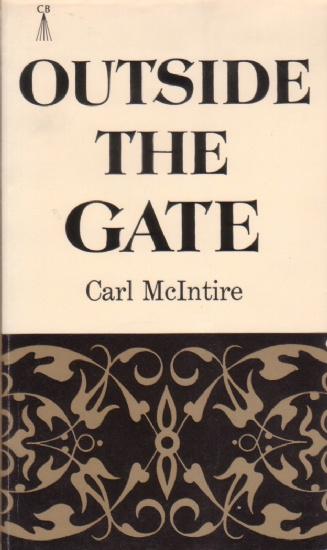
McIntire's Outside the Gate, where he lays out his separatist doctrine.

McIntire considered himself to be first of all a pastor and preacher. His sermons were frequently exegetical, and he often proceeded systematically through particular books of the Bible. He urged his congregation to read the Bible through every year. For McIntire the term Fundamentalist included attachment to the fundamentals of the historic Christian religion as defined by the Westminster Confession of Faith, the doctrinal standard of the Presbyterian Church and by the Apostles Creed and Nicene Creed. He was a Calvinist who believed that John Calvin's Institutes of the Christian Religion, the Westminster Confession, and the Shorter and Larger Westminster catechisms were the finest articulations of the Christian faith.

McIntire emphasized the doctrine of separation, which he based on 2 Corinthians 6:17: "Wherefore come out from among them, and be ye separate, saith the Lord, and touch not the unclean thing; and I will receive you." To McIntire, separation emphasized the purity of the church in opposition to apostasy, the falling away from the historic Christian faith in which he believed theological liberals to be engaged. Like other fundamentalists of the period, McIntire also separated from evangelical groups, such as the National Association of Evangelicals (NAE), which he believed had compromised with the liberalism of the National Council of Churches. He early rejected the Neo-evangelicalism of Billy Graham even before Graham's New York City Evangelistic Crusade of 1957, because Graham's organization had accepted the support of those McIntire regarded as liberals.

== In the public eye ==
Although his Oklahoma family had voted Democratic, McIntire eventually became a conservative Republican. Before and during World War II, McIntire opposed Nazism and anti-Semitism. After the war, he became a champion of anti-Communism and especially one who attacked Communist control of religion in the Soviet Union. McIntire argued that although America had once honored God and freedom, it was in danger of losing its heritage. On his radio program, McIntire often repeated the slogan, "Freedom is everybody's business, your business, my business, the church's business, and a man who will not use his freedom to defend his freedom, does not deserve his freedom."

McIntire attracted considerable public attention through his public demonstrations, early gaining a feel for gestures that attracted popular notice. For instance, in 1947, he unsuccessfully opposed a revised New Jersey state constitution in a radio address entitled, "The Governor's Kittens," while he (more-or-less) held a cat and kittens before the microphone. McIntire attended virtually every important meeting of the World Council of Churches wherever its meetings were held and usually mounted demonstrations with placards outside the meeting hall, calling attention to what he regarded as the WCC's religious apostasy or its collaboration with Russian clergy whom he believed were KGB operatives.

Beginning in 1967, McIntire engaged in a running battle with the Federal Communications Commission over the then-applicable "Fairness Doctrine," by which radio stations had to provide varied political views to retain their licenses. WXUR was "incompetently run and flagrantly disrespectful of FCC requirements," but there was also "no doubt that the station was targeted because many members of the local Philadelphia community found speech expressed on WXUR offensive and therefore wanted it censored." When the FCC refused to renew the WXUR license (rejecting the recommendation of its own examiner) and the station was forced off the air in 1973, McIntire demonstrated his theatrical flair by holding a "funeral" for the station (complete with coffin) while dressed as John Witherspoon, a Presbyterian pastor and signer of the Declaration of Independence.

After a supporter purchased for McIntire a World War II vintage wooden-hulled Navy minesweeper named Oceanic (which McIntire renamed Columbus), he tried to broadcast outside the three-mile limit near Cape May, calling the floating station "Radio Free America." The station began broadcasting at 12:22 PM Eastern Time on September 19, 1973, but was only on the air for ten hours—the ship began to smoke from the heat of the antenna feeder line, and the signal interfered with that of radio station WHLW in Lakewood, New Jersey which broadcast on a neighboring frequency of 1170 kHz. Nevertheless, the notion of a Christian pirate radio station off the United States caught the attention of the media. "I became a very famous man out of that," McIntire later recalled, "People stood along the coast to see me. It was a crazy thing to do, but it was dramatic." Heather Hendershot called McIntire (along with Billy James Hargis, Dan Smoot, and H.L. Hunt) one of "the era’s most prominent extremist broadcasters," a radio personality who helped "pave the way" for conservative talk radio in subsequent decades.

McIntire also gained the public eye in the early 1970s when he organized a half dozen pro-Vietnam War "Victory Marches" in Washington, D.C. The march of October 3, 1970 was supposed to have featured South Vietnamese vice-president Nguyen Cao Ky, but the Nixon administration ensured that Ky would not be present. McIntire attributed the prosecution and conviction of Lt. William Calley on 22 charges related to war crimes at My Lai to "a no-win policy" of the U.S. government in Vietnam.

More than once McIntire's sense of the dramatic passed over into the risible, as for instance, when he urged in 1971 that a full-scale version of the Temple of Jerusalem be constructed in Florida or two decades later when he suggested that Noah's Ark be rebuilt and perhaps refloated off his conference center in Cape May. "It would be a tourist attraction," said McIntire of the latter, "and it would forever down these liberals." In 1975 he proposed the building of a Vietnam War amusement park called New Vietnam. In 1970, when gay activists proposed "Stonewall Nation", the takeover of sparsely populated Alpine County, California, McIntire announced that he would counteract the plan by having his followers move to the area in trailers. Neither the activists nor McIntire did anything of the sort.

== Later life ==
McIntire could combine gravitas with a populist appeal to what he called "the grass roots." A gifted preacher when he chose to be, he seemed to prefer dabbling in politics to Bible exposition. A man who inspired listeners and easily raised money for his various ministries, McIntire had few trustworthy associates to manage the day-to-day activities of his ramshackle empire. Nor could he brook sharing power. In the 1960s his long-time friend and fellow fundamentalist, Robert T. Ketcham, pleaded with McIntire to "be more gracious in his dealings with other Christians," but McIntire instead used the Christian Beacon to attack members of the General Association of Regular Baptist Churches of which Ketcham was an influential leader. In 1971, all but two of the professors of Faith Seminary, including President Allan A. MacRae, left over McIntire's alleged suppression of academic freedom and "oppressive leadership style." McIntire refused to participate in fundamentalist organizations which he could not dominate, even those led by other separatist fundamentalists of the period such as Bob Jones Jr., and Ian Paisley. Nevertheless, McIntire often inspired good-natured respect from some of the religious liberals whom he regularly picketed through the years; and his rhetoric, although sometimes bombastic, was rarely personal.

By the early 1970s, McIntire's ministries were debt-ridden and began to collapse one by one. In 1970, he owed the town of Cape May more than a half million dollars in back taxes. The buildings he had accumulated were sold or destroyed. By the time he died, at age 95, without a successor, virtually everything was gone. Even the shadow that remained of the Bible Presbyterian Church of Collingswood finally forced his resignation in 1999, after he had served the congregation for sixty years. In the words of Joel Belz, McIntire was "a classic example of a brilliant and winsome man who chose his battles badly. Unyielding on petty issues, he divided where division was both unnecessary and costly to the very causes he championed. Too often, he seemed to love the fight more than the very valid issues over which the fights raged." McIntire had repeatedly criticized Princeton Theological Seminary, an institution he had left in 1929, as a bastion of theological liberalism. Yet when Princeton honored him almost affectionately as a distinguished alumnus, McIntire responded to its overtures and donated his papers to the Seminary.

== Works ==
- A Cloud of Witnesses or Heroes of the Faith (Philadelphia: Pinebrook Press, 1938; second edition, Collingswood: Christian Beacon Press, 1965), sermons on Hebrews 11:1-12:2
- Twentieth Century Reformation (Collingswood: Christian Beacon Press, 1944)
- The Rise of the Tyrant: Controlled Economy vs Private Enterprise (Collingswood: Christian Beacon Press, 1945)
- Author of Liberty (Collingswood: Christian Beacon Press, 1946; second edition, 1963)
- For Such a Time as This: The Book of Esther (Collingswood: Christian Beacon Press, 1946) – sermons
- Modern Tower of Babel (Collingswood: Christian Beacon Press, 1949
- Better Than Seven Sons (Collingswood: Christian Beacon Press, 1954) – sermons on the Book of Ruth
- The Wall of Jerusalem Also Is Broken Down (Collingswood: Christian Beacon Press, 1954) – sermons on the Book of Nehemiah
- Servants of Apostasy (Collingswood: Christian Beacon Press, 1955)
- The Epistle of Apostasy: the Book of Jude (Collingswood: Christian Beacon Press, 1958) – sermons
- The Death of a Church (Collingswood: Christian Beacon Press, 1967)
- Outside the Gate (Collingswood: Christian Beacon Press, 1967)

Conciliar offices
Preceded by New Office	President of the International Council of Christian Churches; 1948 – 2002	Succeeded by Choi Kwang Jae

Academic offices
Preceded by Arthur E. Steele	President of Shelton College; 1965–1972	Succeeded by Hyland W. Shepherd
Preceded by Allan MacRae	President of Faith Theological Seminary; 1972–2002	Succeeded by Norman J. Manohar
