= International Council of Christian Churches =

Organization

- Abbreviation: ICCC
- Formation: 12 August 1948
- Founder: Carl McIntire
- Founded at: English Reformed Church, Amsterdam
- Website: iccc-churches.org

The International Council of Christian Churches (abbreviation: ICCC) was founded on 12 August 1948 at the English Reformed Church, Amsterdam, as a fundamentalist Christian group of constituent national churches with opposition to the more liberal-leaning World Council of Churches.

One of the main leaders of the movement was Carl McIntire, a Presbyterian minister, who also founded a number of Bible colleges and the American Council of Christian Churches.

== World Congresses ==
No	Year	Date	Venue	Theme	Member Denominations
1st	1948	11–19 August	Amsterdam, The Netherlands; English Reformed Church	"The Christ of the Scriptures"	150 delegates, 29 countries, 39 denominations
2nd	1950	16–23 August	Geneva, Switzerland	"Twentieth Century Reformation"	450 delegates, 43 countries, 42 denominations
3rd	1954	3–12 August	Philadelphia, PA, USA; Faith Theological Seminary	"The Historic Christian Faith"	1500 delegates, 45 countries, 54 denominations
4th	1958	12–21 August	Rio-Petropolis, Brazil	"The Christ of the Scriptures"	500 delegates, 45 countries, 62 denominations
5th	1962	14–20 August	Amsterdam, The Netherlands	"Jesus Christ, the Same Yesterday, Today, and Forever"	700 delegates, 62 countries, 83 denominations
6th	1965	5–11 August	Geneva, Switzerland	"Jesus Christ, the Way, the Truth, and the Life"	1000 delegates, 53 countries, 111 denominations
7th	1968	12–25 August	Cape May, NJ, USA	"Forever, O Lord, Thy Word is Settled in Heaven"	3000 delegates, 85 countries, 140 denominations
8th	1973	12–24 June	Cape May, NJ, USA	"Worthy is the Lamb"	
9th	1975	16–27 July	Nairobi, Kenya	"The First and the Last"	5000 delegates, 85 countries, 230 denominations
10th	1979	15–28 June	Cape May, NJ, USA	"Christ in the Midst of the Churches"	
11th	1983	16–30 June	Cape May, NJ, USA	"Victory by Faith in Jesus Christ"	
12th	1988	6–16 June	Cape Canaveral, FL, USA	"That They All May be One"	
13th	1990	8–17 August	Vancouver, BC, Canada	"The Churches of Christ, Faithful, Militant, Triumphant"	
14th	1993	9–19 June	Elkins Park, PA, USA; Faith Theological Seminary	"The Spirit and the Bride Say, Come!"	
15th	1997	12–20 February	Santiago, Chile; Internado Nacional Barros Arana	"Finally, My Brethren, Rejoice In The Lord" — Phil. 3:1	
16th	2000	8–14 November	Jerusalem, Israel; Yad Hashmona (Emmaus) Holiday Village	"21st Century Reformation: Even So, Come, Lord Jesus" — Rev. 22:20-21	
17th	2005	8–14 June	Gangwon, South Korea; 21st Century Youth Training Centre	"Stand Fast and Strive Together for the Faith of the Gospel" — Phil. 1:27	240 delegates, 32 countries
18th	2010	11–15 October	The Philippines; Greenhills Christian Fellowship, Manila; Bacolod Pavilion Hotel, Bacolod	“Be Thou Faithful Unto Death” — Rev. 2:10 (Stage One)	
18th	2012		Serra Negra, São Paulo, Brazil	“Be Thou Faithful Unto Death” — Rev. 2:10 (Stage Two)	
19th	2017	8–11 February	Coatzacoalcos, Veracruz, Mexico	“I Am Set for the Defense of the Gospel” — Phil. 1:17	
20th	2020	22–29 January	Puerto Montt, Chile	"God Is Love" — 1 John 4:10	
21st	2023	21–28 June	Collingswood, NJ, USA	"Declare God's Glory Among the nations" — Psalm 96:1-3	

== Leadership ==
President	General Secretary
Rev Dr Carl McIntire (12 Aug 1948 – 2002); Rev Dr Choi Kwang Jae; Rev Dr Nadir Carreño Maufrás; Rev Brad K. Gsell (present)	Rev Dr JC Maris; Rev Dr Quek Kiok Chiang; Rev Dr Quek Swee Hwa; Rev Kenneth Olson (present)

== See also ==
- Thomas Todhunter Shields
