= Harvey Cedars Hotel =

Coordinates: 39.6962°N 74.1442°W

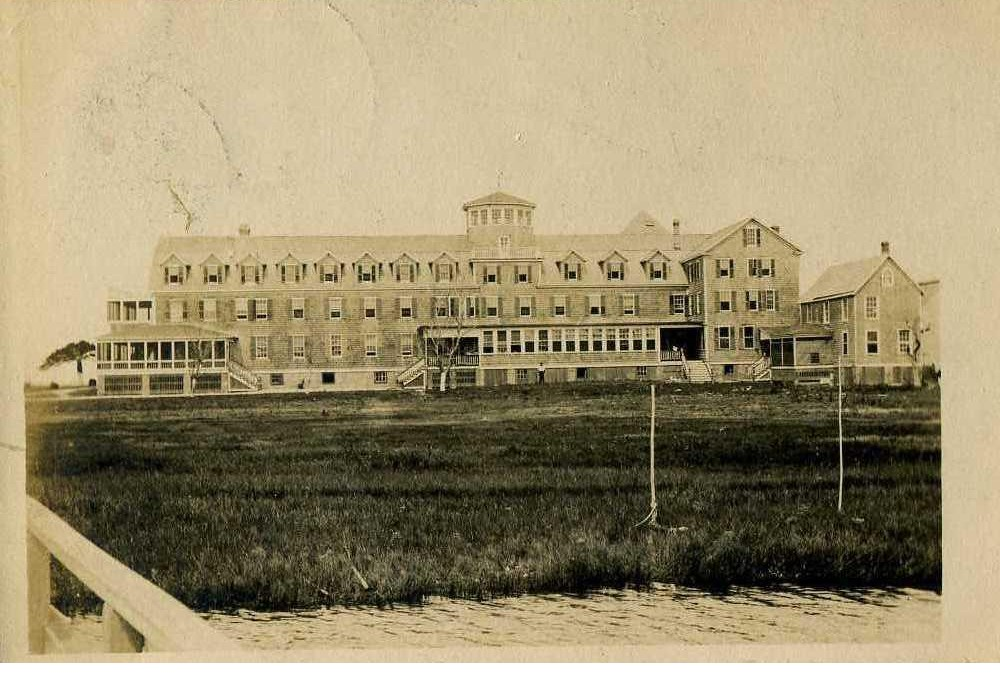
- Harvey Cedars Hotel, 1930s
- Interactive map of the Harvey Cedars Hotel area

General information
- Architectural style: Victorian
- Location: 12 Cedars Ave. Harvey Cedars, New Jersey, United States 08008
- Construction started: 1812-1837
- Opening: 1841
- Renovated: 1887-1903; 1995-2004
- Owner: Harvey Cedars Bible Conference

Technical details
- Floor count: 3

Design and construction
- Architects: Sylvanus Cox, Samuel Perrine, William Thompson

Other information
- Number of rooms: 44

The Harvey Cedars Hotel is the last remaining historic hotel of its size located on Long Beach Island, in the town of Harvey Cedars, New Jersey, United States. It began as a one-story house constructed by Sylvanus Cox between "soon after the War of 1812" and 1837. In 1841, Captain Samuel Perrine purchased and expanded the house into the two-story "Connahassett House at Harvest Cedars," which served as a boarding house for fishermen and duck hunters. Its biggest attraction was its public dance hall on the south side of the building. Sailing parties from other hotels came for lively square dances and reels on summer evenings.

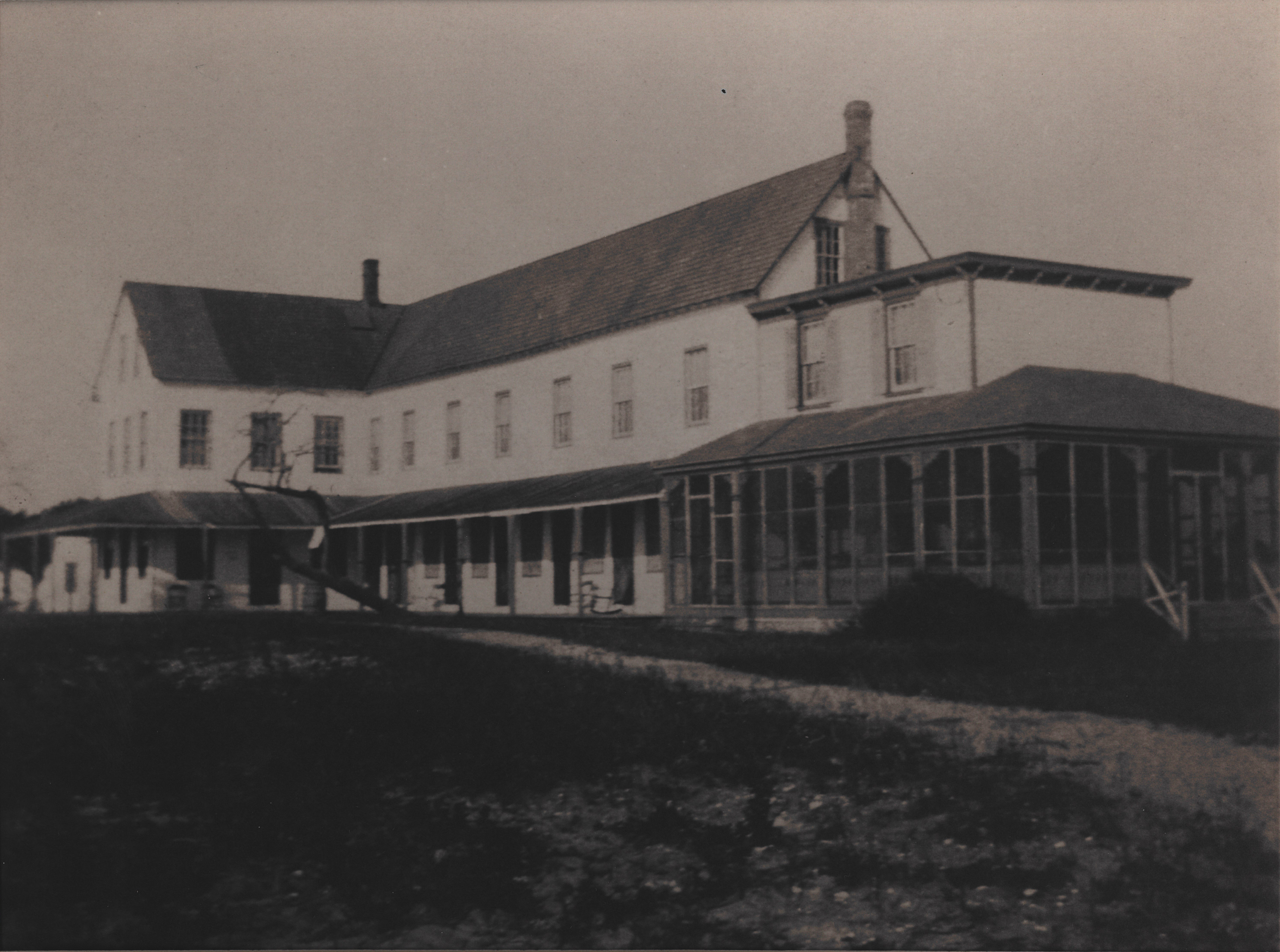
View from south of Harvey Cedars Hotel when it was a 2-story, before 1887-1903 renovation

Sometime between 1865 and 1870, John Warner Kinsey began to run the hotel, and it became known as "Kinsey's." He continued as the hotel keeper until the end of June 1880. Captain Isaac and Mary Jennings were in charge of the Harvey Cedars Hotel by 1881. It was nearly self-sufficient as the property had fruit trees, gardens, animals, and an abundance of seafood from local waters. During this time, additional rooms and a porch on the south end of the hotel were built. Mary made the kitchen [2] equal to the standards of other hotels on the island, featuring a long bar.

From 1886 to at least 1907, William Thompson managed the hotel, including a massive expansion of the building. The hotel was raised off the ground, creating a crawl space, and had the third floor, gambrel roof, dormers, central tower, large porches, water tower (now public bathrooms and an office), and additional rooms added to the bay side. In addition, cedar shingles replaced the white siding. Gas lamps lit the various types of rooms. As a fire precaution, Thompson covered the walls and ceilings of the main dining room (now the lobby and bookstore) with decorative tin, most of which remains today. The hotel went out of business around 1910, and Harvey Cedars Beach Company sold it by 1912. It suffered a succession of owners until sold to the YWCA of Philadelphia, which turned the property into a Christian summer camp for young women named Camp Whelen from 1923 to 1935.

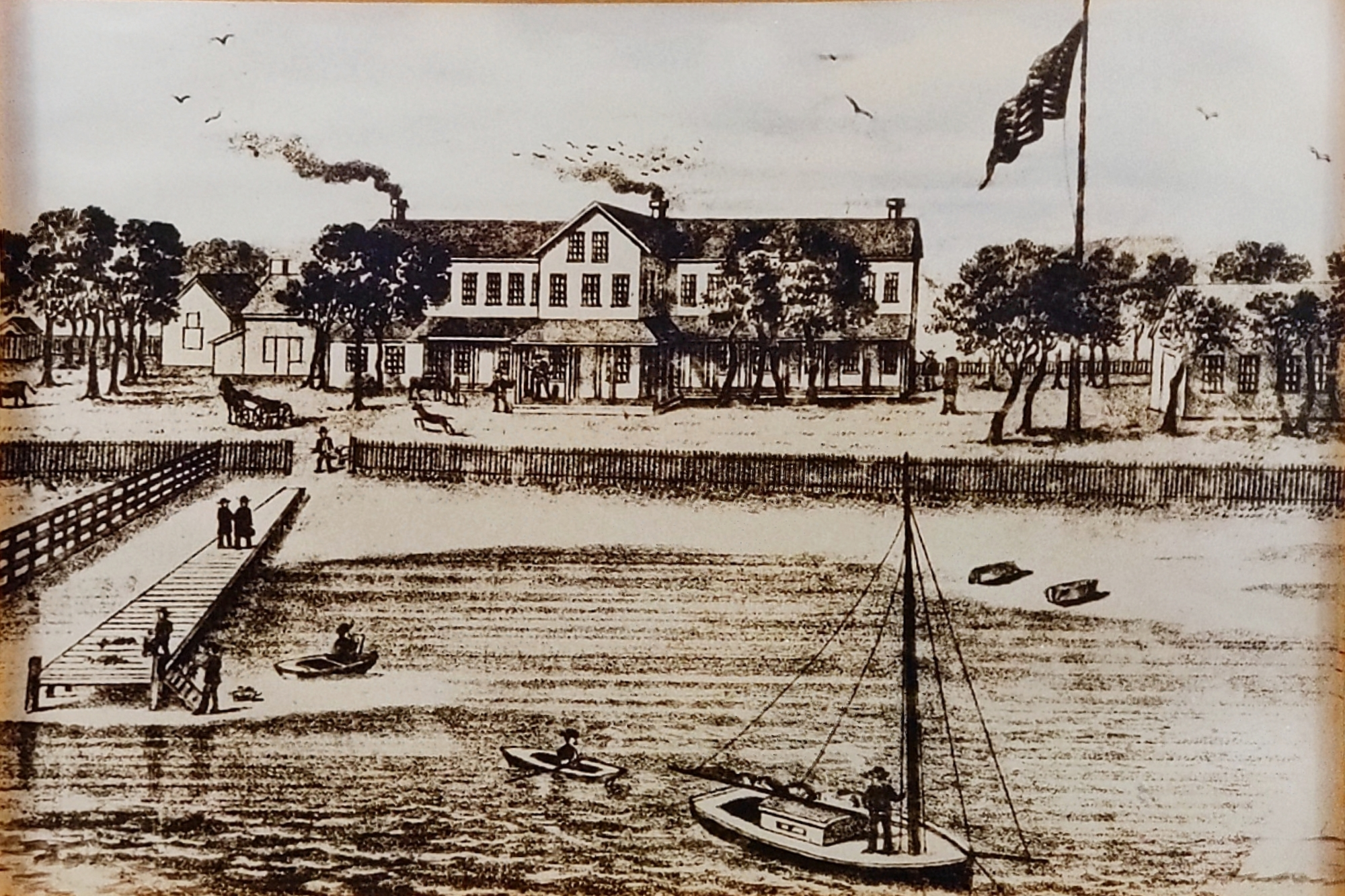
Drawing of Harvey Cedars Hotel in the mid-1800s

Camp Whelen survived until the Depression. After shutting down due to a lack of funds, the hotel was abandoned for about six years. In 1941, Presbyterian minister Jack Murray purchased the hotel and converted it into Harvey Cedars Bible Presbyterian Conference. In 1951, Jack left the operations to Al Oldham. The name was changed to Harvey Cedars Bible Conference and was run by Al until 1995 when he passed on the director position to his son, Jon Oldham.

Years of neglect of the building led to Harvey Cedars Bible Conference's decisions to renovate it over the years. The former dining room (which now serves as the main lounge dedicated in memory of Jack Murray) has been kept mostly original. Two previously-exterior windows from the hotel's earliest form remain on the inside wall in this room, although boarded up and covered with curtains. All exterior windows have been replaced, but the decorative embossed steel walls and ceiling are still present, although painted over, in the inner half of the room. The gas light fixtures were replaced with electric Victorian-style chandeliers. The pocket doors on the south side were covered but are still inside the walls. The former kitchen was expanded and now serves as an ice cream and snack shop. A Springfield Gas Machine, a water-driven air pump used to provide gas lighting, dated August 17, 1868, was found in the hotel's basement and is on display in the main entrance today.

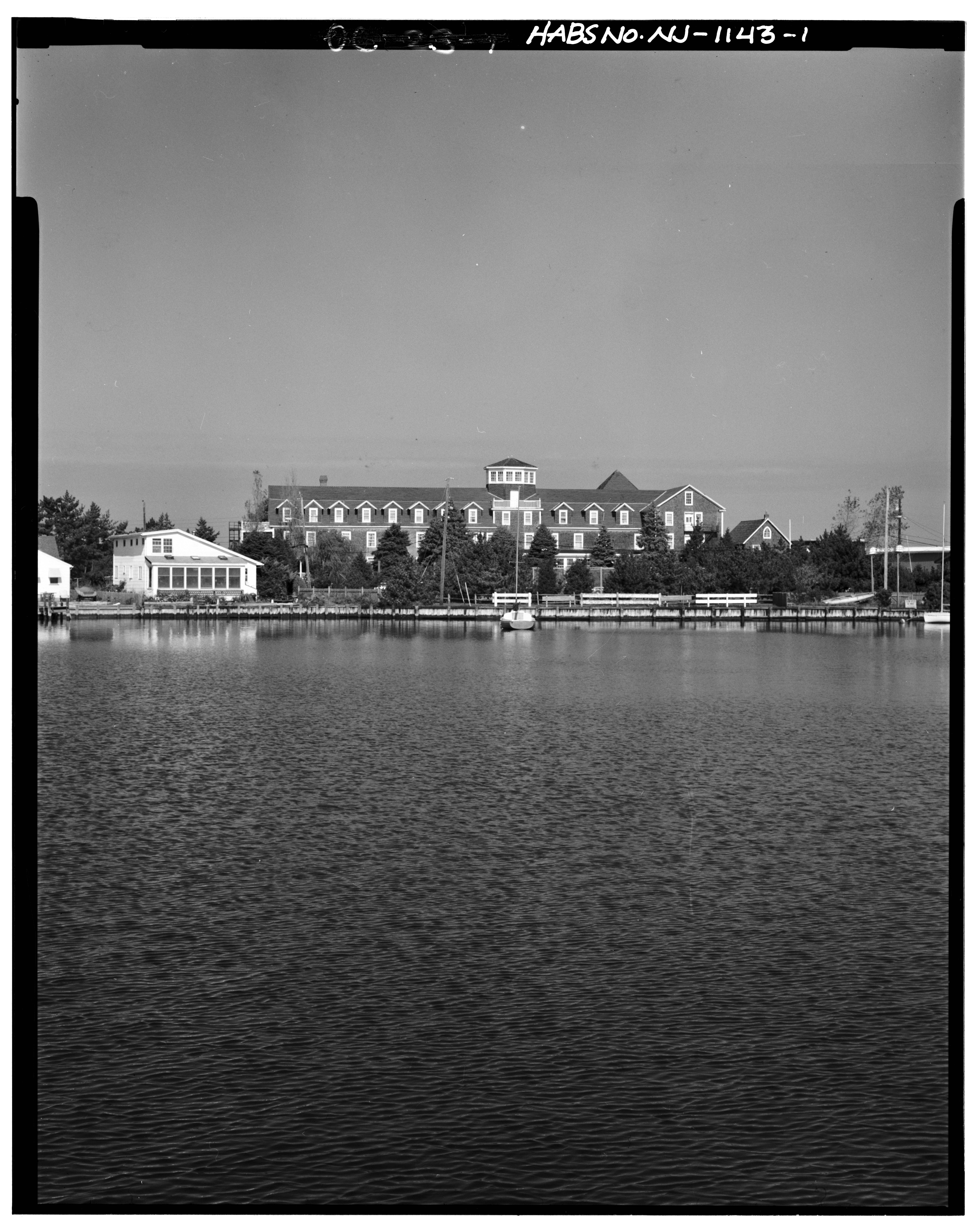
The Harvey Cedars Hotel in 2014

Further renovations between 1995 and 2004 replaced the former bar (more recently a lounge room) with office spaces. Remains of the room's fireplace are inside the walls. Additional offices were built, replacing parts of the west wrap-around porch. The embossed steel ceiling is still present under the new drop ceiling. The former south lounge, which served as the chapel in the 1940s, was extended and converted into conference rooms, and its two matching fireplaces dated 1903 were removed. The south balconies were replaced with one of two fire-resistant stairwells added to each end of the building. The original stairs which extended from the former kitchen to the attic were mostly removed, but some sections remain in the walls. Many rooms were gutted and rebuilt out-of-style with the original Victorian architecture, some being repurposed as public restrooms.

In 2021, the former 1860s house, which was connected to the hotel in the 1903 expansion and served as a staff dormitory for HCBC, was entirely gutted and renovated into an apartment space. The bricks of the original chimney were preserved and sold.

Today, the hotel is named the Victorian Hotel and serves as the main building for Harvey Cedars Bible Conference.
