= Independent Board for Presbyterian Foreign Missions =

Presbyterian mission organization

The Independent Board for Presbyterian Foreign Missions (IBPFM) is a small Presbyterian mission organization, which early in its history became an approved agency of the Bible Presbyterian Church. Founded in 1933 by J. Gresham Machen, the IBPFM played a significant role in the Fundamentalist–Modernist Controversy within the Presbyterian Church in the U.S.A. The Independent Board continues under its founding charter, maintaining its original purpose of "promoting truly Biblical missions" consistent with Presbyterian doctrine and polity.

The Board has approximately 30 missionaries in Central and South America, Kenya, Cambodia, and India. There are four full-time headquarters staff members in Plymouth Meeting, Pennsylvania.

== History ==
In 1932, the Presbyterian Board of Foreign Missions took an ambiguous position in regard to a theologically liberal report on missions, a decision that provided conservatives in the denomination further ammunition when one of the denomination's most prominent missionaries, the author Pearl S. Buck, endorsed the document as "masterly statement" and labeled traditional notions of salvation "superstitious." The following year, conservative theologian J. Gresham Machen was instrumental in creating the Independent Board for Presbyterian Foreign Missions. Interpreting the existence of the new board as a direct challenge to its denominational authority, the Presbyterian Church brought the members of its board to trial—although Machen was never given the opportunity to defend his actions. In March 1935, the members of the Independent Board were found guilty and suspended from the ministry. In 1936, fundamentalists less concerned than Machen with the board's Presbyterian identity, ousted Machen as president and installed "a minister of a nondenominational church." After Machen's untimely death in 1937, the IBPFM came under the control of Carl McIntire, the founder of the Bible Presbyterian Church. Although Board members and missionaries from various Presbyterian denominations have served the Independent Board, it has remained closely aligned with the Bible Presbyterian Church. In the first 20 years of its existence the Board commissioned almost 150 missionaries.

== Leadership ==
The Board has had seven presidents:

- John Gresham Machen, founder
- Harold S. Laird
- James Gordon Holdcroft
- Lynn Gray Gordon
- Earle R. White
- William R. LeRoy
- Brad K. Gsell (current President)
- Keith Coleman (current Executive Director)
