= Shelton College =

Private religious college in New Jersey

- Former name: National Bible Institute
- Active: 1907–1991
- Principal: J. Oliver Buswell
- Location: New Jersey, United States

Shelton College was a private, Christian, liberal arts college that was located in Cape May, New Jersey. It was involved in a landmark case requiring religious schools to acquire a state license to grant academic degrees.

The college motto was "Training Christian Warriors."

== History ==
Shelton College was founded by Don Odell Shelton in 1907 as the National Bible Institute of New York City, and it was incorporated in 1908. The Union Missionary Training Institute of Brooklyn, founded by Lucy D. Osborn in 1885, merged with the National Bible Institute in 1916. From 1925 to 1952 the National Bible Institute's headquarters were located at 340 West 55th Street in New York City and was known as the National Bible Institute School and Dormitory.

Carl McIntire was instrumental in the leadership of the college from the early 1940s until it closed in 1991.

The National Bible Institute was renamed as Shelton College in 1950. The college moved to a campus in Ringwood, New Jersey, in 1953, then to Cape May, New Jersey in 1963.

In 1971 the college moved to Cape Canaveral, Florida, and then back to Cape May in 1979.

In September 1973, McIntire became Chancellor.

In New Jersey Board of Higher Education v. Shelton College, the Supreme Court of New Jersey forbade Shelton from granting degrees without a state license. The school became a certificate granting institution until it closed in 1992.

In 2014, the roof collapsed and the building was demolished.

== Academic programs ==
- Bachelor of Arts (BA)
- Bachelor of Sacred Theology (STB)
- Bachelor of Theology (BTh)
- Bachelor of Divinity (BD)
- Bachelor of Religious Education (BRE)
- Master of Religious Education (MRE)

== Notable alumni ==
- Edwin M. Yamauchi, historian
- Spiros Zodhiates, author and Biblical scholar
- Ronald E. Manahan, president of Grace College and Theological Seminary
- Timothy Tow, principal of Far Eastern Bible College

== Notable faculty ==
- Jack Murray, President
- Arthur E. Steele, President
- Francis Nigel Lee, Theology
- Virginia Ramey Mollenkott, English
- Gary G Cohen, Physics

== Publications ==
Shelton College publishes a theological journal, The Bible Today.

== Leadership ==
President
- Don Odel Shelton (1907 - 29 Jan 1941)
- J. Oliver Buswell (15 May 1941 - 1955)
- John W. Murray (1955 - 1960)
- Clyde J. Kennedy (1960 - 1962)
- Arthur E. Steele (1962 - 1965)
- Carl McIntire (1965 - 1972)
- Hyland W. Shepherd (1972 - 1977)
- Irwin W. Steele (Acting) (1977 - 1978)
- Glenn Rogers (1978 - 1982)
- Dennis J. M. Brown (1982 - )
