= Bible Presbyterian Church =

Confessional Presbyterian denomination located primarily in the United States

- Classification: Evangelical Protestant
- Orientation: Orthodox
- Theology: Reformed
- Polity: Presbyterian
- Origin: 1937; Collingswood, New Jersey
- Separated from: Orthodox Presbyterian Church
- Separations: Evangelical Presbyterian Church, American Presbyterian Church, Faith Presbytery, Bible Presbyterian Church
- Congregations: 28
- Members: 3,500
- Official website: https://bpc.org/

The Bible Presbyterian Church is an American Protestant denomination in the Reformed tradition. It was founded by members of the Orthodox Presbyterian Church over differences on eschatology and abstinence, after having left the Presbyterian Church in the United States of America over the rise of modernism.

The denomination comprises 31 churches, 30 in the United States and 1 church in Alberta, Canada divided between the Great Western Presbytery, the Eastern Presbytery, the Great Lakes Presbytery, and the Florida Presbytery. The highest governing body is the Synod.

== History ==
=== Origin ===
The Bible Presbyterian Church (BPC) was formed in 1937, predominantly through the efforts of such conservative Presbyterian clergymen as Carl McIntire, J. Oliver Buswell and Allan MacRae. Francis Schaeffer was the first minister to be ordained in the new denomination (1938). The First General Synod of the Bible Presbyterian Church was held in 1938 in Collingswood, New Jersey.

The Bible Presbyterian Church (BPC) and the Orthodox Presbyterian Church (OPC) split in 1937. The two groups were previously (in 1936) known as the Presbyterian Church of America (not to be confused with the similar but later Presbyterian Church in America). The name had to be abandoned because of a successful lawsuit in civil court by the mainline denomination regarding name infringement – a trademark-violation issue. After leaving the mainline Presbyterian Church in the United States of America (PCUSA), considerable dissension became apparent among the conservative separatists themselves, and it became evident that two separate denominations were forming. The OPC became identified by Reformed Orthodoxy, and a predominance of amillennial eschatology and leadership of professors at Westminster Seminary. The OPC held to a fundamentalism in doctrine but did not identify with the cultural fundamentalism that characterized the BPC and much of the evangelical world at that time. Machen tried to mediate between the two groups, but he fell ill and died in 1937.

The BPC espoused a conservatism that showed a keen interest in cultural and political matters, Communism in particular. The BPC saw the missions of the PCUSA as largely bankrupt due to the influence of Communism on the missionaries in China. Pearl S Buck, a Pulitzer Prize winner, was a Presbyterian missionary and member of the mainline mission board. She had to resign from the mainline missions agency for comments in favor accommodating communism in China. She denigrated what Machen's conservatives stood for. The foreign missions leaders and J Gresham Machen hated what the mainline missions had become, seeing them as nothing more than liberal humanitarianism. Since the BPC men were in charge of Machen's Mission Board, they saw the mission of Independent Board for Presbyterian Foreign Missions (IBPFM) as more integral to the reformed witness than did the OPC. The BPC maintained a strong commitment to foreign missions as part of their commitment to the Great Commission. McIntire was defrocked alongside J Gresham Machen for his refusal to resign from the IBPFM. For decades afterward McIntire voiced his opposition to Communism and promoted conservative politics in conjunction with his BPC church planting efforts. The IBPFM is still an agency of the BPC.

Two main issues made the existence of these factions within the OPC evident. One issue had to do with a conflict over the use of alcoholic beverages. The OPC condemned drunkenness, but nevertheless did not agree that Scripture required Christians to totally abstain from drinking alcoholic beverages, while the BPC (according to the prevailing conservative cultural view of Prohibition) asserted that the Bible prohibited the consumption of alcohol entirely (see also Christianity and alcohol). The BPC of the 21st Century holds to the same biblical view as the OPC that alcohol is permitted in moderation.

The second issue was over eschatological liberty. The Bible Presbyterians were concerned about a growing movement to scrutinize ministers with a premillennial eschatology. Premillennialism stems from a literal reading of Matthew 24, Daniel 7, and Revelation 20. The amillennialism of the OPC is a less-literal reading which often takes eschatological passages figuratively. On one side the BPC ministers thought liberalism came from a loose reading of Scripture. And on the other the OPC sensed a theological error that could lead to liberalism. Both sides sensed a growing disunity. Though the IBPFM, the mission agency that caused the original split with the PCUSA, was chaired and run by premillenarists, missions was not the main concern of the theologians at Westminster Seminary.

Another aspect of this eschatology conflict is the commitment to reformed covenant theology versus the toleration of dispensationalism. Those on the BPC side had come to tolerate, and some used, the popular Scofield Reference Bible, whose notes taught a theological system called dispensationalism. Covenant theology is the main view held by most Reformed churches. Scofield's notes were under considerable criticism by faculty members of Westminster Theological Seminary, who led the OPC. The OPC considered the dispensational form of premillennialism a serious error. Many in the BPC saw the criticisms against Scofield's notes as a swipe against historic premillennialism itself. Many more churches joined the BPC in 1938. One contributing factor of the exodus was the failure of Milo F. Jamison, a dispensationalist, to be elected Moderator of the General Assembly. The Bible Presbyterian Church has always maintained the unity of the covenant of grace (a decidedly non-dispensational position), and, in later years, passed resolutions against dispensationalism in its annual Synod meetings. The BPC is now in formal fraternal relations with the OPC, and many of these theological differences have been resolved.

=== First split ===
From 1955 to 1956, a fairly acrimonious split occurred in the Bible Presbyterian Church, resulting in the Bible Presbyterian Church Collingswood Synod and the Bible Presbyterian Church Columbus Synod.

While the Bible Presbyterian Church Collingswood Synod remained under the influence of McIntire, the BPC Columbus Synod, which included such men as Francis Schaeffer and Jay E. Adams would eventually move beyond its Bible Presbyterian Church heritage and eventually would take the name the Evangelical Presbyterian Church in 1961 (which is not to be confused with the current denomination of the same name, founded in 1981). In 1965, the Evangelical Presbyterian Church merged with the Reformed Presbyterian Church, General Synod, a denomination of "new light" Covenanter descent, to form the Reformed Presbyterian Church, Evangelical Synod (RPCES). The RPCES would eventually merge with the Presbyterian Church in America in 1982.

Shortly before the split, the Bible Presbyterian Church had established Covenant College and Covenant Theological Seminary, both of which would be supported by the BPC Columbus Synod/Evangelical Presbyterian Church and both would follow the Evangelical Presbyterian Church into first the RPCES and then the PCA.

=== Second split ===
The remaining synod retained the name "Bible Presbyterian Church." In the 1970s, a group of churches split from the denomination, espousing a premillennial eschatology. In addition, the separate churches split for advocating exclusive psalmody and abstinence from alcohol. This denomination, known as the American Presbyterian Church, has remained small since its formation. In 2022, it was composed of 2 churches, which together had 60 members.

=== Third split ===
On March 28, 2008, the South Atlantic Presbytery voted by a wide margin to disassociate from the Bible Presbyterian Synod, in opposition to formal relations recently established between the Synod and the Orthodox Presbyterian Church. The presbytery took the name Faith Presbytery, Bible Presbyterian Church.

=== Recent history ===
Today the North American body has 33 congregations. Bible Presbyterians do not have synod-controlled boards for missions and education, but annually approve independent agencies for mission work, as well as colleges and seminaries.

=== Resources ===
The BPC publishes and maintains for public use the Westminster Shorter Catechism website.

== Doctrine ==
The Westminster Confession of Faith, Larger Catechism, and Shorter Catechism was adopted in the first Bible Presbyterian Synod in 1938. The Synod adheres to the 1788 American Revision of the Westminster Confession.

The denomination describes itself as an evangelistic and confessional church which believes in historic Calvinism. It holds to the five fundamentals and describes itself as being opposed to modernism, compromise, indifferentism, and worldliness.

== General Synod ==
No.	Year	Date	City	Venue	Moderator	Stated Clerk	Assistant Stated Clerk
1st	1938	Sep 6-8	Collingswood, NJ		Rev J U Selwyn Toms	Rev Dr H McAllister Griffiths	
2nd	1939	Nov 14-16	Collingswood, NJ		Rev Dr Harold S Laird	Rev G Douglas Young	
3rd	1940	Oct 22-24	Chester, PA		Rev Dr Allan A MacRae	Rev G Douglas Young	
4th	1941	Oct 14-16	Charlotte, NC		Rev Edgar A Dillard	Rev G Douglas Young	
5th	1942	Nov 5-10	St. Louis, MO		Rev J Gordon Holdcroft	Rev Stanley P Allen	
6th	1943	Oct 14-19	Wilmington, DE		Eld Roland K Armes	Rev Stanley P Allen	
7th	1944	Oct 12-17	Greenville, SC		Rev Dr J Oliver Buswell, Jr	Rev Stanley P Allen	
8th	1945	May 24–29	Harvey Cedars, NJ	Harvey Cedars Bible Presbyterian Conference	Rev Flournoy Shepperson, Sr	Rev Stanley P Allen	
9th	1946	May 23–28	Collingswood, NJ	Bible Presbyterian Church of Collingswood	Rev Dr Carl McIntire	Rev Robert Hastings	
10th	1947	Jul 17-22	Tacoma, WA	Tacoma Bible Presbyterian Church	Rev Dr Roy T Brumbaugh	Rev Robert Hastings	
11th	1948	May 13–19	Nashville, TN	Bible Presbyterian Church of Nashville	Rev Francis A Schaeffer	Rev Robert Hastings	
12th	1949	May 16–31	Baltimore, MD	Bible Presbyterian Church of Baltimore	Eld Dr Peter Stam, Jr	Rev Robert Hastings	
13th	1950	Jun 1-6	St Louis, MO	First Bible Presbyterian Church of St Louis	Rev G Douglas Young	Rev Robert Hastings	
14th	1951	May 31 - Jun 5	New York, NY	Shelton College	Rev John W Sanderson, Jr	Rev Robert Hastings	
15th	1952	Aug 21-26	Pasadena, CA	Highland College	Rev Dr Robert G Rayburn	Rev Robert Hastings	
16th	1953	Jun 4-9	Elkins Park, PA	Faith Theological Seminary	Rev William A Mahlow	Rev Robert Hastings	
17th	1954	Jun 3-9	Greenville, SC	Bible Presbyterian Church of Greenville	Rev Dr Linwood G Gebb	Rev Robert Hastings	
18th	1955	Jun 2-8	St Louis, MO		Rev Dr J Oliver Buswell, Jr	Rev Robert Hastings	
19th	1956	Apr 5-11	St Louis, MO		Rev Dr R Laird Harris	Rev W Harold Mare	
20th	1956	Nov 23-27	Collingswood, NJ		Rev Dr Carl McIntire	Rev A Franklin Faucette	Rev Emanuel Peters
21st	1957	Nov 2-6	Collingswood, NJ		Rev Dr Clyde J Kennedy	Rev A Franklin Faucette	Rev John E Janbaz
22nd	1958	Oct 22-27	Collingswood, NJ		Rev Dr Charles E Richter	Rev A Franklin Faucette	Rev John E Janbaz
23rd	1959	Oct 21-26	Collingswood, NJ		Rev Dr Arthur G Slaght	Rev A Franklin Faucette	Rev Robert B Vandermey
24th	1960	Oct 19-24	Collingswood, NJ		Rev John E Janbaz	Rev A Franklin Faucette	Rev Robert B Vandermey
25th	1961	Oct 19-24	Collingswood, NJ		Rev Dr J Philip Clark	Rev A Franklin Faucette	Rev Robert B Vandermey
26th	1962	Oct 17-22	Collingswood, NJ		Rev Dr Albert B Dodd	Rev A Franklin Faucette	Rev Robert B Vandermey
27th	1963	Oct 16-22	Cape May, NJ	Christian Admiral	Rev Dr George W Fincke, Jr	Rev A Franklin Faucette	Rev James Blizzard
28th	1964	Oct 14-20	Cape May, NJ	Christian Admiral	Rev Dr Lynn Gray Gordon	Rev A Franklin Faucette	Rev James Blizzard
29th	1965	Oct 19-25	Cape May, NJ	Christian Admiral	Rev Dr Carl McIntire	Rev A Franklin Faucette	Rev James Blizzard
30th	1966	May 18–23	Boston, MA	Statler Hilton Hotel			
