= Harvey Cedars Bible Conference =

Church-owned complex in New Jersey, United States

Coordinates: 39.69625°N 74.14425°W

- Formerly: Harvey Cedars Presbyterian Bible Conference
- Industry: Christian retreats
- Founded: August 1, 1941; 84 years ago
- Founder: John W. Murray
- Headquarters: Harvey Cedars, New Jersey
- Key people: Jonathan Oldham (Executive Director)
- Website: hcbible.org

Harvey Cedars Bible Conference is a Christian retreat center in Harvey Cedars, New Jersey, providing conferences, retreats, and other events. The Bible Conference has a long history of biblically oriented ministries and vacations for families and people of all ages and ethnicities.

Summers feature week-long family and teen conferences. The rest of the year is filled with retreats for different organizations, including at least one retreat which brings in hundreds from other countries.

Lodging facilities include a Victorian hotel, a modern hotel, a motel, and other dormitory-style housing units. Other facilities include a dining hall, a dock and gazebo, a tennis court, an indoor heated swimming pool, an indoor hot tub, a gymnasium, volleyball courts, and a soccer field.

== History ==
Harvey Cedars Bible Conference (called Harvey Cedars Bible Presbyterian Conference until 1949) has occupied the former, historic Harvey Cedars Hotel since August 3, 1941.

Presbyterian minister Jack Murray purchased and restored the old hotel, which was abandoned for six years, and converted it into Harvey Cedars Bible Presbyterian Conference. After ten years of directing the conference, Jack left the operations to Albert Oldham. It was run by the senior Oldham until 1995 when the director position was passed on to his son, Jon Oldham.

In 1949, the chapel was built on the property using stained glass windows purchased from the Engleside Hotel in Beach Haven. These windows were completely removed around 2003 after years of damage from the high winds. Many other additions and renovations took place in the following decades.

For more information on the building's history, see Harvey Cedars Hotel and Camp Whelen as they occupied the same hotel during different eras.

== Namesake ==
A significant signpost in the history of the Bible Presbyterian Church was the publication and approval of what came to be known as the Harvey Cedars Resolutions. In 1945 the Eighth General Synod of the BPC convened at the denomination's conference center in Harvey Cedars, New Jersey. Thus the name applied to the resolutions. With its approval, the Bible Presbyterian Church codified much of what had already characterized the denomination, namely its stance on the twin issues of personal and ecclesial separation.
