= New Jersey Board of Higher Education v. Shelton College =

1982 New Jersey Supreme Court case

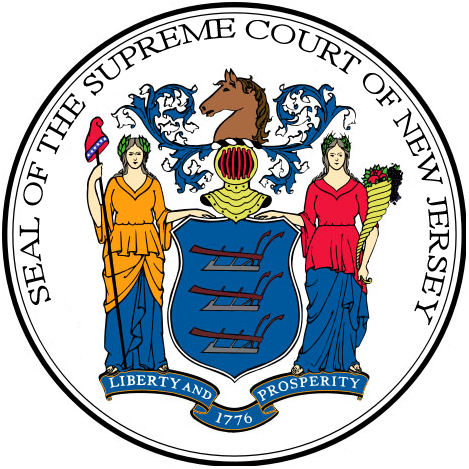
- Court: Supreme Court of New Jersey
- Full case name: The New Jersey State Board of Higher Education and T. Edward Hollander, Chancellor of the New Jersey Department of Higher Education, Plaintiffs-Respondents, v. The Board of Directors at Shelton College, Glenn Rogers and Carl McIntire, Defendants-Appellants.
- Argued: March 8, 1982
- Decided: August 9, 1982
- Citation: 448 A.2d 988, 90 N.J. 470

Holding
- Neither the Free Exercise nor the Establishment Clauses of the First Amendment prohibit the state from requiring religious institutions of higher education to be licensed.

Court membership
- Chief Justice: Robert N. Wilentz
- Associate Justices: Morris Pashman, Robert L. Clifford, Sidney M. Schreiber, Alan B. Handler, Stewart G. Pollock, Daniel J. O'Hern

Case opinions
- Majority: O'Hern, joined by unanimous

Laws applied
- U.S. Const. amend. I

New Jersey Board of Higher Education v. Shelton College, 90 N.J. 470 (1982), 448 A.2d 988, is a New Jersey Supreme Court case regarding state regulation of religious schools which grant academic degrees. The Court held that religious schools are prohibited from granting degrees without a state license.
