= Faith Theological Seminary, Baltimore =

Christian seminary in Baltimore, Maryland, USA

Coordinates: 39°22′19″N 76°36′22″W

Faith Theological Seminary
- Type: Private unaccredited seminary
- Established: 1937; 89 years ago
- Religious affiliation: Evangelicalism
- Location: Baltimore, Maryland, United States
- Website: ftscatonsville.org/

Faith Theological Seminary is an evangelical Christian seminary in Baltimore, Maryland. It was founded in 1937 in Wilmington, Delaware, relocated to Philadelphia in 1952, and then moved to Maryland in 2004. As of October 2026, FTS received full accreditation by the Association of Reformed Theological Seminaries (ARTS) Since ARTS is officially recognized by the Council for Higher Education Accreditation (CHEA), FTS will appear on CHEA website as an accredited institution

by ARTS. Please read full accreditation announcement on the official website of FTS (https://www.ftscatonsville.org/faith-fully-accredited)

== History ==
In response to the Presbyterian controversies of the early twentieth century, in 1929, under the leadership of J. Gresham Machen, a group of scholars was organized to start a new institution. They found quarters for the new seminary (Westminster Theological Seminary) in two townhouses in Philadelphia, housing students in the Drake Hotel.

Allan A. MacRae served as the first president of FTS from 1937 until 1971.

Subsequent to McIntire's death, Norman J. Manohar assumed the presidency, moving the seminary to Maryland, until September 14, 2020 when he was terminated by the board of directors for "gross financial mismanagement, misappropriation, and negligence" and for having fraudulently represented his degrees to accreditors (Maryland Higher Education Commission [MHEC] Investigative Report of Sept 9, 2019, states that claiming unearned credentials is "incongruent with the 'demonstrated history of ethical practice required by COMAR 13B.02.02.13B'"). A private attorney's Investigative Report of January 14, 2019, identified the misrepresentation of several academic credentials and financial malfeasance. Further, an investigative report conducted by the institution's accrediting body, the Transnational Association of Christian Schools and Colleges (TRACS) led to termination of accreditation on May 21, 2020 (TRACS correspondence, May 29, 2020). Pursuant to the regulations of COMAR I 3B.02.02.08L(6), MHEC subsequently removed its Authorization as of May 21, 2020 (MHEC correspondence, Secretary of Academic Affairs, June 15, 2020).

== Academics ==
Faith Theological Seminary previously offered a Bachelor of Arts (BA) in Religion, a Master of Divinity (M.Div.), a Doctor of Ministry (D.Min.), and a Doctor of Theology (Th.D.) degree. The institution was accredited by the Transnational Association of Christian Colleges and Schools (TRACS) but lost accreditation in May 2020. When Faith Theological Seminary lost its accreditation from TRACS in May 2020, the state of Maryland also subsequently suspended its degree-granting privileges. It was closed with a teach-out plan implemented with Lancaster Bible College and Capital Seminary. In 2021, Faith Theological Seminary of Catonsville reincorporated and received a religious exemption approval to operate in the state of Maryland and grant undergraduate and graduate degrees.

== Notable alumni ==
- Arthur Glasser, 1942
- Vernon Grounds, 1940
- Kenneth Kantzer, 1942
- Francis Schaeffer, 1938
- Arthur E. Steele, 1959
- Timothy Tow
