= Lookout Mountain Hotel =

- U.S. National Register of Historic Places
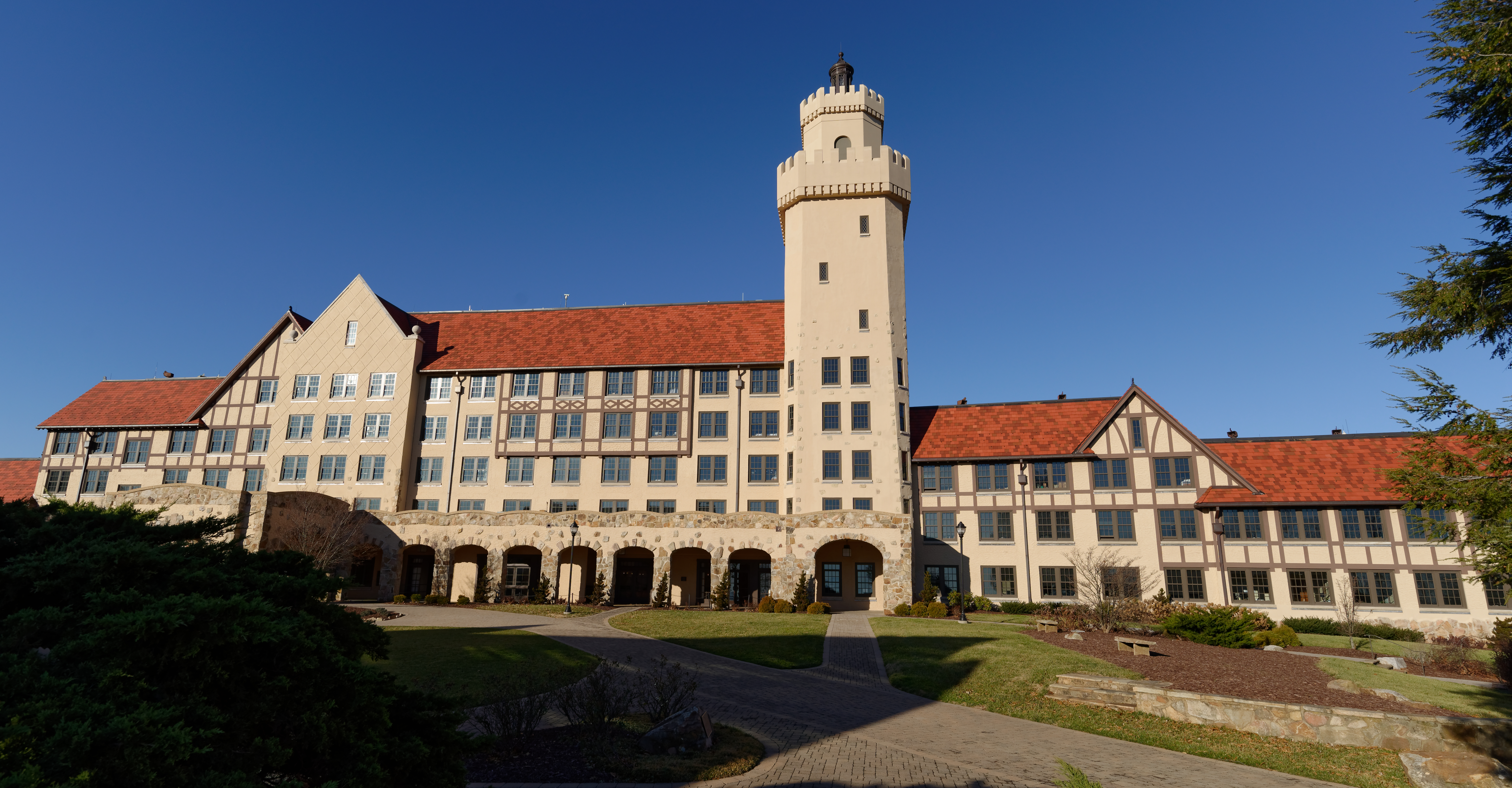

- Location within Georgia
- Location: 14049 Scenic Hwy., Lookout Mountain, Georgia
- Coordinates: 34.965536°N 85.374909°W
- NRHP reference No.: 100003423
- Added to NRHP: February 27, 2019

The Lookout Mountain Hotel is a grand resort hotel that was built on Lookout Mountain in Dade County, Georgia in 1928. The building is now part of the Covenant College campus, where it is named Carter Hall. It is nicknamed "The Castle in the Clouds".

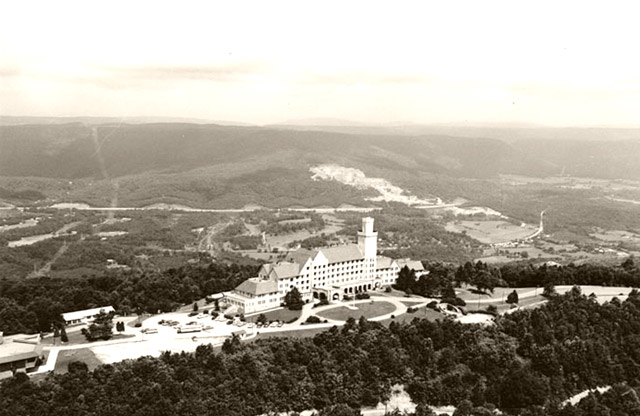
Historic photo

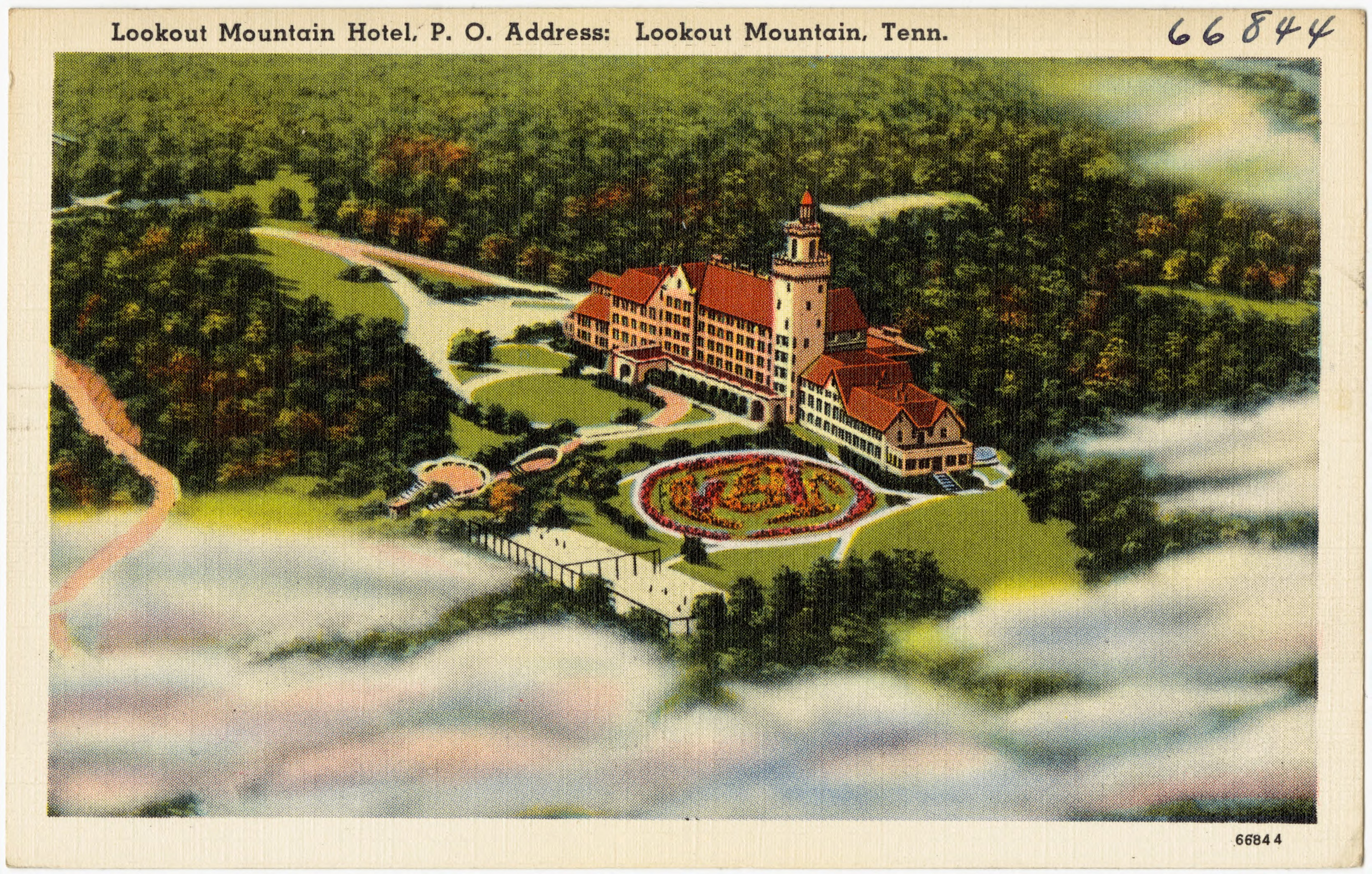
Postcard, from 1930-45 era

It is a five-story building designed by architect Reuben Harrison (R.H.) Hunt, and opened as a hotel on June 23, 1928. It was built as part of a tourism surge in the area. Nearby attractions similarly built in the Dixie Highway area there, and were supported by the 1927 paving of roads there, are Fairyland Inn (1925), Rock City Gardens (1932), and Ruby Falls (1930).

It was extensively renovated in the late 1970s but was restored to be more like the original over a period of a decade, ending in 2017. It was listed on the National Register of Historic Places in 2019.
