= Paul Carter (entrepreneur) =

American businessman (1888–1979)

Paul Carter (1888–1979) was an American businessman, entrepreneur, and philanthropist in Chattanooga, Tennessee and nearby Lookout Mountain who, along with his father James Inman Carter and brother Garnet Carter (who also created Rock City and invented miniature golf), developed most of Lookout Mountain, Tennessee and Lookout Mountain, Georgia. Through marriage to his second wife, Ann Lupton Carter, Paul became the President over a large Coca-Cola Bottling Company territory. The Dinkler Hotel Corporation of Atlanta built the original Lookout Mountain Hotel in 1927; Paul Carter was chosen to run it; the building is now owned by Covenant College and named "Carter Hall" in Carter's honor.
