= Clark Byers =

American artist

Clark Byers (25 January 1915 – 17 February 2004) was an American sign maker. He is famous for painting over 900 barns in 19 states with the slogan "See Rock City" from 1935 to 1969.

A native of Trenton, Georgia, Byers started painting advertising on barns in the American South and Midwest for the Rock City attraction atop Lookout Mountain, Tennessee. Rock City's owners offered barn owners a free paint job and Rock City souvenirs in exchange for allowing Byers to placing a marketing message on their barns.

Because the barns came in various shapes and sizes, each sign was different, but all featured white lettering on a black background, executed in freehand. The number of words and their arrangement varied, based on the size and shape of the barn. On larger barns, Byers might have painted "See 7 States from ROCK CITY atop Lookout Mt. near Chattanooga, Tenn." and on smaller barns, just "See Beautiful ROCK CITY today."

Byers' efforts led to Rock City, Lookout Mountain, and Chattanooga becoming a national tourist destination.
