= Barn advertisement =

Form of outdoor advertisement

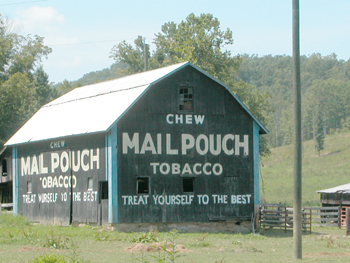
A Mail Pouch Barn in southern Ohio

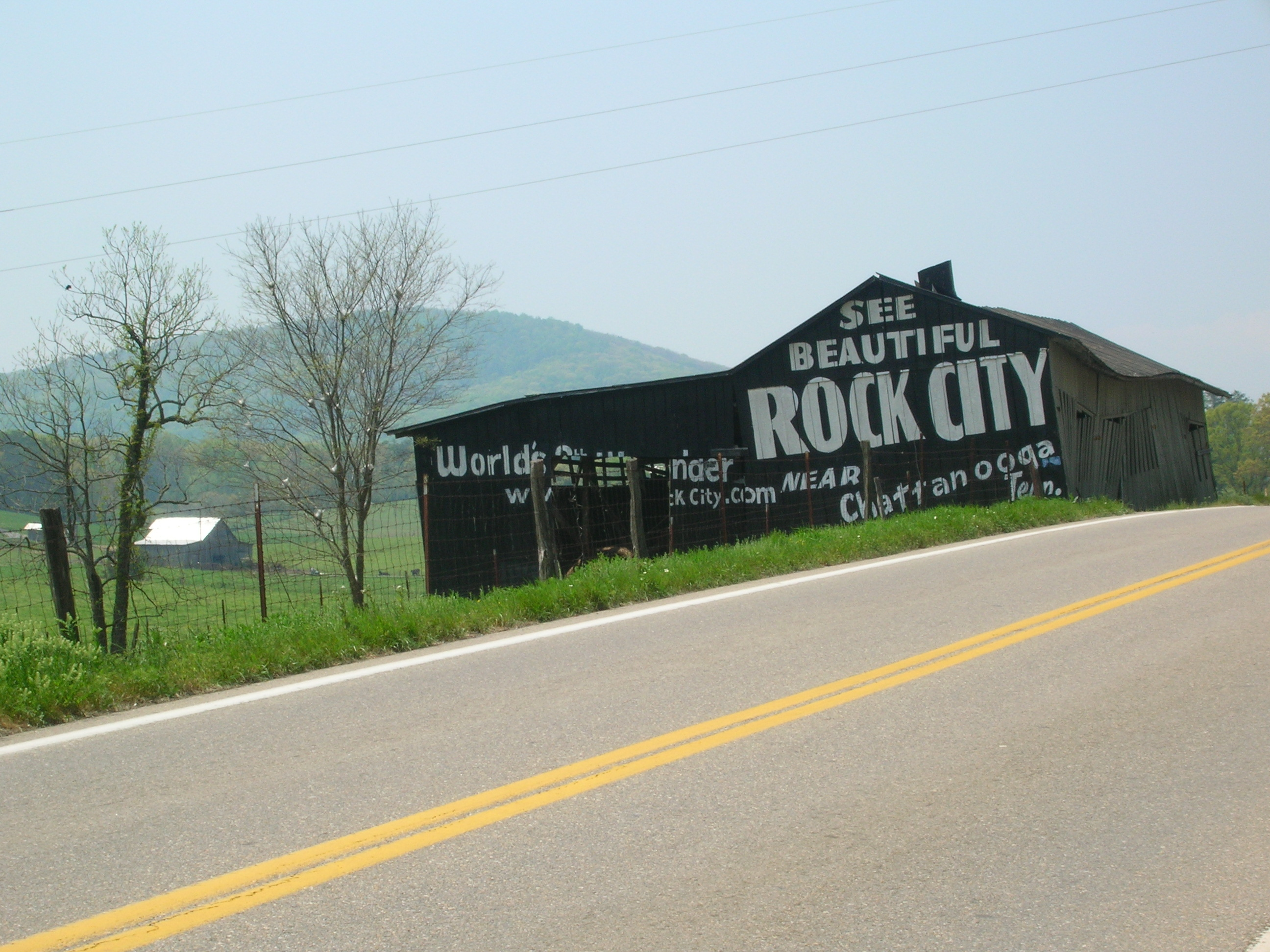
A Rock City barn in Sevier County, Tennessee

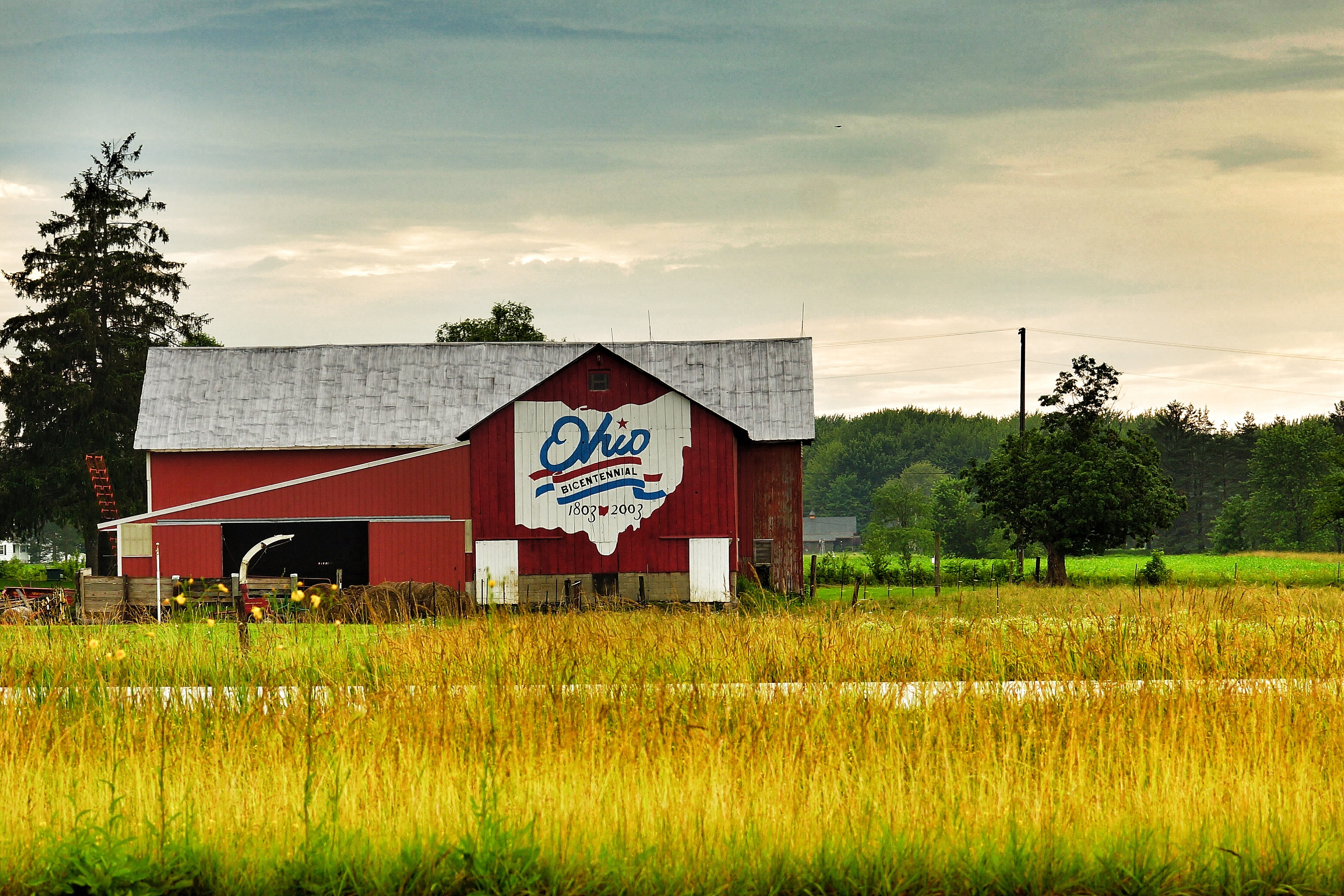
An Ohio Bicentennial barn in Ashtabula County

A barn advertisement is an outdoor advertisement painted onto the exterior of a roadside barn. Advertisers take advantage of the barns' prominence in rural landscapes, paying their owners for the right to paint and maintain logos and slogans on them. Painters of barn advertisements and other murals are known as "wall dogs". Once a common form of billboard advertising in the Midwestern and Southeastern United States during the early– to mid–20th century, barn advertisements have faded into obscurity, as many of these rural ghost signs fall into disrepair, along with the structures that bear them.

== Advertisers ==
Common barn advertisers include local roadside attractions, restaurants, and chewing tobacco manufacturers.

The Bloch Brothers Tobacco Company is credited with popularizing the medium. The company began advertising their products on the sides of buildings in 1890. By 1925, they had moved to advertising on Mail Pouch Barns. At the program's height in the early 1960s, some 20,000 barns in 22 states displayed Mail Pouch advertising, with the greatest number in Ohio. Most of the barns were painted by Harley Warrick. Competitors such as Red Man and Hillside Tobacco also painted barns in smaller numbers.

In the early 1940s, Clark Byers painted barns and their roofs for Rock City near Chattanooga, Tennessee, often with messages promising travelers the chance to see seven states from atop Lookout Mountain. Byers painted advertisements for the attraction on over 900 barn roofs in 19 states.

More recently, Bob Evans Restaurants painted barns in Indiana and Illinois in a style identical to their billboards, until 2001. The restaurant chain later painted some barns with the Italian tricolor to advertise their pasta dishes. Frisch's Big Boy also advertised on barns at one point.

From 1997 to 2002, the Ohio Bicentennial Committee commissioned Scott Hagan to paint 101 barns, including one in each county, with the committee's logo and colors. One was destroyed by a tornado shortly after its painting and was replaced. A few have since been torn down or repainted. The painted barns celebrated the state's 200th anniversary in 2003. Each barn took about 18 hours of labor and 7 US gallons (26 L; 5.8 imp gal) of paint. Enthusiasts traveled from across the state to watch Hagan paint the barns. An estimated one million people saw at least one of the barns.

Since 2009, Hagan has also been commissioned to paint barns with anti-tobacco and breast cancer awareness messages in West Virginia.

== Regulation ==
In 1965, Congress passed the Highway Beautification Act, which regulated and in some cases removed billboards from the sides of federally funded highways. Barn advertisements were also affected by this legislation, leading owners to paint over them, until public outcry led to a 1974 amendment that specifically exempted them as "folk heritage barns". The National Historic Barn Preservation Act of 2001 protects barns 50 years or older from demolition and funds education programs about these structures.

== Method ==
The advertisements are sketched then painted freehand, with the painter standing on a scaffolding platform.

== See also ==
- Out-of-home advertising
- Quilt trail
