= Highway beautification =

Highway beautification is landscaping intended to enhance the attractiveness of roads, preserve scenic beauty, and control of the usage of the land near highways. This may include vegetation, irrigation, street furniture, decorative pavings, fences, and lighting. Benefits from highway beautification include reduction in driving stress, improved visual quality, and improved roadway safety, with cities citing decreases in total number of crashes after beautification projects. However, in some places, objects that may become hazards to erratic vehicles may be banned in projects, such as trees, large shrubs, boulders, dirt mounds, or concrete sections as improper landscaping can reduce visibility or increase roadway debris. Highway beautification may occur in urban, semi-urban, or rural areas.

In the United States, highway beautification is subject to the Highway Beautification Act, Section 131 of Title 23, United States Code (1965), commonly referred to as "Title I of the Highway Beautification Act of 1965, as Amended". The act placed restrictions on billboard advertising along highways and the removal or screening of junkyards.

Ongoing maintenance of adjacent landscaping usually falls to local governments. However, organizations can be registered to ensure long-term maintenance as well. Adopt a Highway or Sponsor-a-Highway programs or campaigns are often used by municipalities to carry out many highway beautification projects by offering volunteers from organizations or individual groups to do activities such as, carrying out litter pick-ups, invasive plant spotting, reporting, or landscape maintenance.
