= Covenant College =

Christian liberal arts college in Lookout Mountain, Georgia, US

Coordinates: 34°57′57.6″N 85°22′26.4″W

- Motto: "In All Things Christ Preeminent"
- Type: Private liberal arts college
- Established: 1955; 71 years ago
- Religious affiliation: Presbyterian Church in America
- Academic affiliations: Council for Christian Colleges and Universities, Covenant Theological Seminary, Southern Association of Colleges and Schools, IAPCHE
- Endowment: $64.4 million (2024)
- President: Brad Voyles
- Undergraduates: 1,030
- Postgraduates: 64
- Location: Lookout Mountain, Georgia, United States
- Campus: Rural, 400-acre (160 ha) mountaintop
- Colors: Blue, white, and sky blue
- Nickname: Scots
- Sporting affiliations: NCAA Division III – CCS
- Website: covenant.edu

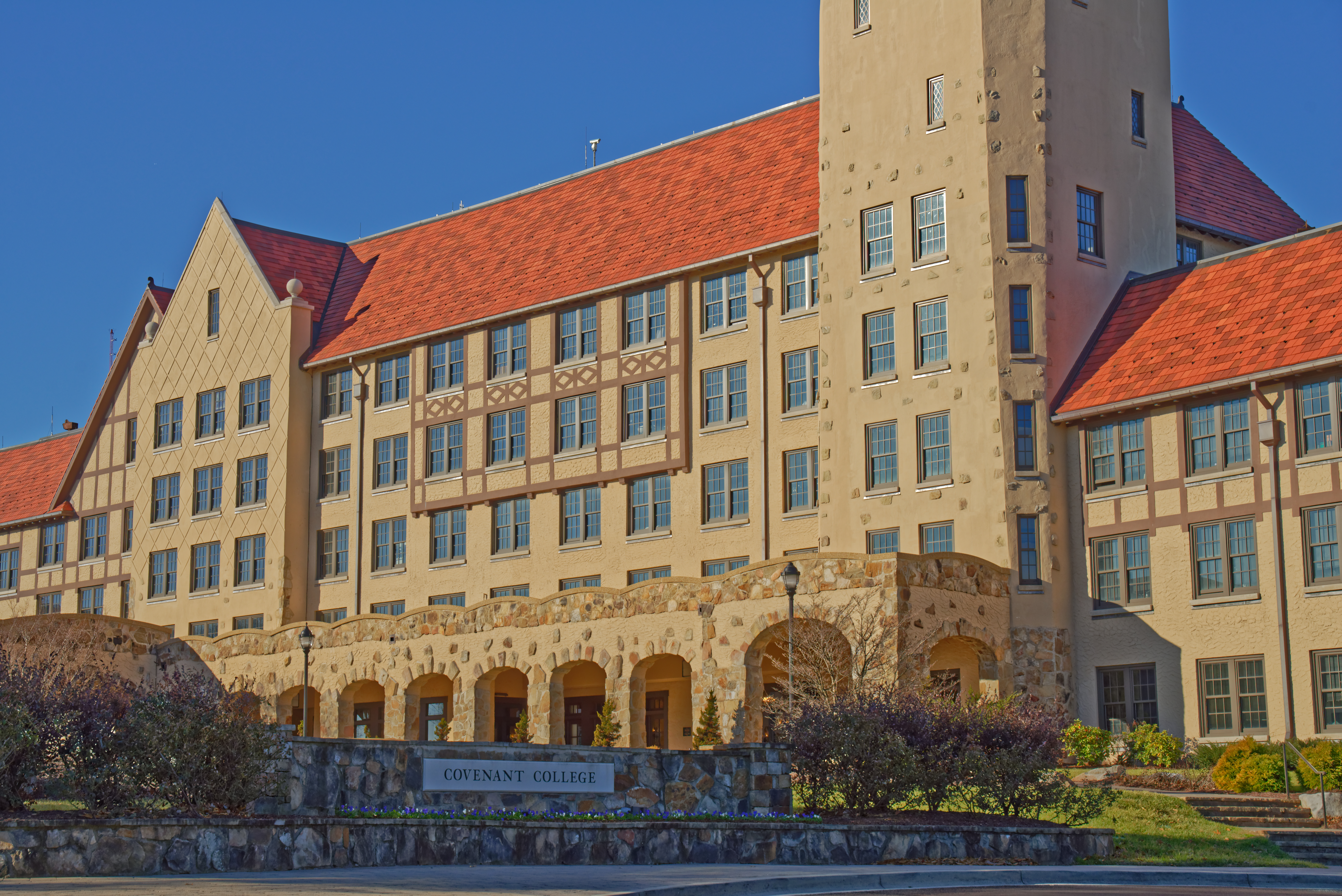
Carter Hall in 2019, formerly Lookout Mountain Hotel

Covenant College is a private, liberal arts, Christian college in Lookout Mountain, Georgia, United States, located near Chattanooga, Tennessee. As the college of the Presbyterian Church in America, Covenant teaches subjects from a Reformed theological worldview. Approximately 1,000 students attend Covenant each year.

== History ==
Founded in 1955 in Pasadena, California, as an agency of the Bible Presbyterian Church, Covenant College and Covenant Theological Seminary moved its campus to St. Louis, Missouri, the following year. Following a split among the Bible Presbyterians, it became affiliated with the Bible Presbyterian Church-Columbus Synod (renamed the Evangelical Presbyterian Church in 1961). In 1964, it separated from the seminary, moving to Lookout Mountain, in Georgia. In 1965, it was the site of the merger between the Evangelical Presbyterian Church and the Reformed Presbyterian Church, General Synod to form the Reformed Presbyterian Church, Evangelical Synod. It became and remains an agency of the Presbyterian Church in America after the 1982 merger between the RPCES and the PCA. As such, Covenant stands in the Reformed and Presbyterian traditions.

=== Presidents ===
- Robert G. Rayburn (1955–1965)
- Marion Barnes (1965–1978)
- Martin Essenburg (1978–1987)
- Frank A. Brock (1987–2002)
- Niel Nielson (2002–2012)
- J. Derek Halvorson (2012–2023)
- Brad Voyles (2023–present)

== Academics ==
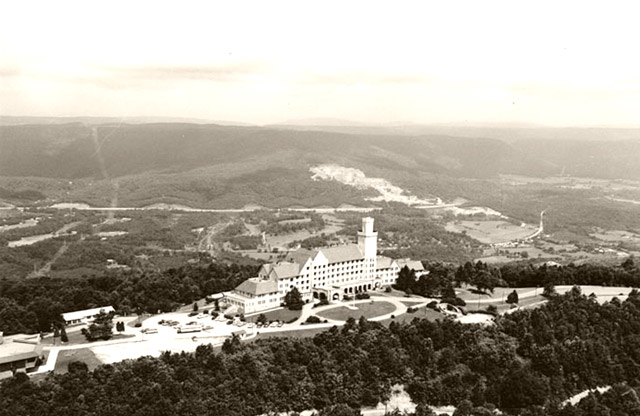
The Lookout Mountain Hotel, now home to Covenant College

Covenant College offers liberal arts education from a Reformed Christian perspective. The focus of the college is found in its motto, "In All Things Christ Preeminent." The purpose of this focus is to ground excellence in academic inquiry in a biblically grounded frame of reference.

The college offers Bachelor of Arts, Master of Arts in Teaching, and Master of Education degrees, and academic certificates in Arts Administration, Entrepreneurship, Environmental Stewardship and Sustainability, Journalism and Society, Medical Ethics Consultation, Neuroscience, and Teaching English to Speakers of Other Languages (TESOL).

The college has been accredited since 1971 by the Southern Association of Colleges and Schools (SACS).

=== Research institutions ===
The Chalmers Center for Economic and Community Development (established 1999), which is a 501(c)3 non-profit, was founded at Covenant to offer courses and programs in community and economic development in the urban United States and throughout the majority world.

The Brock Barnes Center for Leadership is a new addition to the college, headed by former college President Derek Halvorson. Brock-Barnes "draws on biblical insights, interdisciplinary liberal arts thinking, and the experience of seasoned practitioners to inspire and equip the next generation to lead with excellence."

== Student publications and clubs ==
Students at Covenant publish a bi-weekly newspaper called The Bagpipe, which includes reporting on campus news, events, and local issues as well as art and media reviews, opinions, and more. A satirical version is published annually on April 1 called The Windbag with takes on campus life and culture.

Covenant's literary magazine is The Thorn and has been published annually since 1970. The magazine features creative work from the students, including poetry, short stories, and personal essays.

Covenant also has over forty clubs, including a debate club, fishing club, ultimate frisbee club, paintball club, pre-law club, spikeball club, swing-dancing club, tri-beta club, a pickleball club, and a standup comedy club called "Laugh Track."

== Faculty ==
Covenant has 65 full-time faculty, 89% of whom have doctorates or other terminal degrees. The student-faculty ratio is 12:1. This ratio allows "personal, small class size," with an average of 17 students per class.

Faculty are required to state their agreement with the Westminster Confession of Faith.

== Athletics ==
The Covenant athletic teams are called the Scots. The college is a member of the NCAA Division III, primarily competing in the newly created Collegiate Conference of the South (CCS) since the 2022–2023 academic year. The Scots previously competed in the D-III USA South Athletic Conference (USA South) from 2013–2014 to 2021–2022; the defunct D-III Great South Athletic Conference (GSAC) from 2010–2011 to 2011–2012 (although its women's sports continued until 2012–2013); as an NCAA D-III Independent during the 2009–2010 and 2012–2013 school years; and in the Appalachian Athletic Conference (AAC) of the National Association of Intercollegiate Athletics (NAIA) from 2001–2002 to 2008–2009.

Covenant competes in 14 intercollegiate varsity sports: Men's sports include baseball, basketball, cross country, golf, soccer, tennis and track & field; while women's sports include basketball, cross country, soccer, softball, tennis, track & field and volleyball. Former sports included women's golf.

Recently, the women's volleyball finished the 2023 season with a 35–3 record, a top 25 national ranking, and a trip to the NCAA Division III tournament, where they defeated No. 15 ranked Mount St. Joseph University before losing to No. 7 ranked Emory University in the second round.

The men's tennis team has also found much success recently, winning two straight conference titles. In 2023, they finished with an 18–7 record and advanced to the NCAA tournament for the first time in school history.

== Campus ==
The campus is located at the top of Lookout Mountain in Dade County, Georgia, near the city of Lookout Mountain, Georgia and approximately fifteen minutes from the city of Chattanooga, Tennessee.

=== Carter Hall ===
Carter Hall is the signature building on campus. It was originally named The Lookout Mountain Hotel and was built in 1928 by the Dinkler Hotel Corporation and run by Paul Carter, for whom the building is now named. It has been rumored, although not confirmed, that Elizabeth Taylor and Eddie Fisher spent their honeymoon there. It was popularly known as the "Castle in the Clouds." However, since it was completed less than a year before the Great Depression, the hotel soon went bankrupt. It opened and closed several times prior to 1960, when it shut down for the last time. Bill Brock, the grandfather of the college's fourth president, Frank Brock, served on the original board of the hotel.

Both the exterior and interior of Carter Hall are Austro-Bavarian Gothic revival in style. The building has had two towers in its history. The first tower was similar in design to the Frauenkirche (Cathedral of Our Lady) in Munich. Poor maintenance before acquisition by the college required it to be rebuilt. The new tower, though considerably simpler in style, maintains the architectural style of the original tower. Every year, the incoming freshman class will sign their name and graduation year on the walls of the tower.

Covenant College bought the building in 1964, upon relocating to Lookout Mountain. During the first few years of Covenant's operation on the mountain, all the functions of the college were contained within Carter Hall. At that time, it housed the chapel, the library, the classrooms, the professors' offices, dorm rooms, the dining hall, and administrative offices. Today, it has all of these except the library and chapel, as well as a cafe called "The Blink", the campus bookstore, and the mailroom.

From 2015 to 2017, Carter underwent significant renovations. They included improving the stucco, fixing insulation and moisture issues, and renovating the tower.

=== Dora Maclellan Brown Chapel ===
The Dora Maclellan Brown Chapel on campus houses the music and theater department. Chapel occurs on campus three times a week, with various Christian speakers from all around the country.

== Notable alumni ==
- Rifqa Bary (2018), religious convert
- Aaron Belz (1993), poet
- Joel Belz (1962), founder, God's World Publications, former publisher, WORLD Magazine
- Mark Gornik (1983), pastor, theologian, and author
- Wes King (1981), recording artist
- Kathryn Kimball Mizelle (2009), United States District Judge of the United States District Court for the Middle District of Florida
- Paul Moser (1979), analytical philosopher
- Isaac Wardell (2005), musician and music producer
