= Niel Nielson =

American academic administrator (born 1954)

Niel B. Nielson (born 1954 in Dallas, Texas) is former president of Covenant College in Lookout Mountain, Georgia, United States.

== Education ==
He holds a B.A. in philosophy from Wheaton College in Wheaton, Illinois, and an M.A. and Ph.D. in philosophy from Vanderbilt University.

== Professional life ==
He began his career as an assistant professor of philosophy at Bethel College in Arden Hills, Minnesota, but soon departed for the world of business.

Between 1984 and 1997, he served as an executive officer in various Chicago based companies, including for two years as Senior Vice President of Chicago Research and Trading Group, Ltd. From 1996 to 1997, he worked as partner and trader for Ritchie Capital Markets Group, LLC. He holds several investment company directorships, including 13 directorships of closed-end funds associated with the First Trust group of funds, 39 directorships of exchange-traded funds associated with the First Trust group of funds, and one directorship of the First Defined Portfolio Fund LLC.

In 1997, he left the business sector to become Associate Pastor of Outreach for College Church in Wheaton, Illinois, where he remained until 2002, when he became the fifth president of Covenant College. He resigned as president in July 2012. He was succeeded by J. Derek Halvorson.

During his Covenant presidency, he served on the boards of directors for Good News Publishers/Crossway Books, Allied Arts of Chattanooga, the Chattanooga Symphony and Opera, and Covenant Transportation Group, Inc., where he functioned as chairman of its compensation committee.

In November 2009, Nielson signed an ecumenical statement known as the Manhattan Declaration calling on Evangelicals, Catholics and Orthodox not to comply with rules and laws permitting abortion, same-sex marriage and other ideals that go against their religious doctrines.

== Personal life ==
Nielson is married to Kathleen (née Buswell), and, together, they have three grown sons. Kathleen is the granddaughter of former Wheaton College president, J. Oliver Buswell. A Wheaton alum, Kathleen also holds M.A. and Ph.D. degrees in English literature from Vanderbilt University, and has written many popular Bible studies.
