= Highway Beautification Act =

1965 United States federal legislation

Highway Beautification Act of 1965
- Long title: An Act to provide for scenic development and road beautification of the Federal-aid highway systems
- Enacted by: the 89th United States Congress

Citations
- Public law: Pub. L. 89–285
- Statutes at Large: 23 U.S.C. § 131

Legislative history
- Introduced in the Senate as S. 2084; Passed the House on October 8, 1965 (245-138); Passed the Senate on September 16, 1965; Signed into law by President Lyndon B. Johnson on October 22, 1965

In the United States, highway beautification is the subject of the Highway Beautification Act (HBA), passed in the Senate on September 16, 1965 and in the U.S. House of Representatives on October 8, 1965, and signed by the President Lyndon B. Johnson on October 22, 1965. This created "23 USC 131" or Section 131 of Title 23, United States Code (1965), commonly referred to as "Title I of the Highway Beautification Act of 1965, as Amended", and nicknamed "Lady Bird's Bill." It was the pet project of the First Lady, Lady Bird Johnson, who believed that beauty, and generally clean streets, would make the U.S. a better place to live.

The act called for control of outdoor advertising, including removal of certain types of signs, along the nation's growing Interstate Highway System and the existing federal-aid primary highway system. It also required certain junkyards along Interstate or primary highways to be removed or screened and encouraged scenic enhancement and roadside development.

== Background ==
In 1958, Congress passed the first outdoor advertising control legislation commonly known as the "Bonus Act", PL 85-381. However, since it was repealed and replaced by the Highway Beautification Act of 1965, it is now found in the United States Code at 23 U.S.C. 131 (j). Its provisions still exist by reason of agreements with the states.

The Bonus Act provided an incentive to states to control outdoor advertising within 660 feet (200 m) of the Interstate highway system. States which volunteered for the program would receive a bonus of one-half of one percent of the Federal highway construction costs on segments of Interstate highways controlling outdoor advertising.

=== Bonus Act amendments ===
Two amendments were adopted which allowed outdoor advertising along portions of Interstate highways. The first amendment was known as the "Cotton Amendment", which exempted any areas adjacent to part of a right-of-way, to July 1, 1956. This allowed billboards in areas adjacent to interchanges, overpasses, and along roads that ran parallel to the interstate

The second, known as the "Kerr Amendment", allowed outdoor advertising in commercial and industrial zones. Incorporated municipal boundaries were frozen as of September 21, 1959 (the date of the amendment). Another feature of the Kerr Amendment was that outside city limits, signs were permitted only in commercial or industrial zones as of September 21, 1959. (In effect, the zones were frozen. Inside city boundaries, zoning was not frozen for purposes of outdoor advertising control.)

=== Bonus Act sign compensation ===
The Bonus Act provided that states could either remove existing signs under the police power or under the power of eminent domain by paying just compensation. If the state chose to pay compensation the Federal government provided 90 percent as the federal match for Interstates.

=== States enacting Bonus Act provisions ===
The following 25 states enacted laws to implement the "Bonus" program:

California, Maine, Pennsylvania, Colorado, Maryland, Rhode Island, Connecticut, Nebraska, Vermont, Delaware, New Hampshire, Virginia, Georgia, New Jersey, Washington, Hawaii, New York, West Virginia, Illinois, North Dakota, Wisconsin, Iowa, Ohio, Kentucky, and Oregon.

Two states, Georgia and North Dakota, dropped the bonus program; Georgia by court decision and North Dakota by legislation.

=== Signs allowed under the Bonus Act ===
Under the Bonus Act, four classes of signs were permitted without regard to zoning.

- Class One Signs included directional or other official signs or notices required or authorized by law.
- Class Two Signs included signs advertising the sale or lease of the property upon which they are located. On premises signs were not permitted by the Bonus Act itself. This was apparently a drafting or typographical error. The national standards later included them in Class Two Signs.
- Class Three Signs included those erected or maintained pursuant to authorization or permitted under state law and not inconsistent with the national policy and standards of the law, and advertising activities conducted at a location within 12 miles (19 km) of the point at which such signs were located.
- Class Four Signs included signs erected or maintained pursuant to authorization in state law and not inconsistent with the national policy and standards, and designed to give information in the specific interest of the traveling public.

Bonus Act standards are set out at Title 23, Code of Federal Regulations, Part 750, Subpart A.

== The Highway Beautification Act of 1965 ==
The Highway Beautification Act of 1965 had its genesis in President Lyndon B. Johnson's State of the Union message in January 1965, when he mentioned a program to beautify the nation's highways. On February 8, 1965, the President announced his intention to call a White House Conference on Natural Beauty in mid-May 1965. In the message, the President noted that the existing program of voluntary outdoor advertising control (i.e., the bonus program) would expire on June 30, 1965 and that he intended to "recommend legislation to insure effective control of billboards along our highways."

The White House conference met in Washington, D.C., on May 24 and 25, 1965, chaired by Laurance Rockefeller. There were 800 delegates and an additional number of observers. The Roadside Control panel recommended to:

Amend 23 U.S.C. 131 (the highway statute) to provide that the grant of primary and Interstate funds be conditioned with the requirement that the erection and maintenance of all outdoor advertising signs, displays, and devices in all areas within 1,000 feet (300 m) of the outer edge of pavement of the primary system and Interstate system of highway be controlled.

A majority of the panelists believed that no off-premises advertising should be permitted in any areas adjacent to the primary system or Interstate system. One panelist, Phil Tocker, was of the view that off-premises advertising should be permitted in commercial, industrial, and business areas without regard to their being zoned as such. A second panelist, Lowell K. Bridwell, then Under Secretary for Transportation, US Department of Commerce, later joined Tocker in voting for outdoor advertising in commercial and industrial areas.

On May 26, 1965, the President transmitted four draft bills to provide for highway beautification. Three had to do with the eventual three titles of the Highway Beautification Act, namely, outdoor advertising control, junkyard control, and highway landscaping. The fourth was a scenic road bill.

=== Outdoor Advertising Control Bill - S.2084 ===
The outdoor advertising control bill was introduced by Senator Jennings Randolph of West Virginia on June 3, 1965, as S.2084. Features were:

- Roads controlled: Interstate and primary
- Control zone: 1,000 feet (300 m)
- Penalty: 100% of state's highway funds

=== Exemptions ===
- Direction and other official signs, no standards.
- On-premises and sale-or-lease signs under national standards.
- Signs in commercial and industrial zones and areas, but no standards.
- Compensation - Not required. If a state proved they couldn't use police power, federal funds were available.

The bill was assigned to the Senate Public Works Committee which quickly reported it back to the floor for a vote. The Senate passed the bill by a vote of 63 to 14 on September 16, 1965. In the House of Representatives, the bill was assigned to the House Public Works Committee and reported back to the floor on September 22, 1965. However, due to pressure on members from special interest groups, the bill languished on the floor while its sponsors tried to garner support. At the urging of President Lyndon Johnson, the bill was passed by a vote of 245 to 138 at 1:00 am on October 8. The House version was subsequently passed by the Senate on October 13.

=== Major amendments prior to passage, and the author ===
Amendment	Author of Amendment
Reduced control zone of 1,000 feet (300 m) to 660 feet (200 m)	Senate Committee
Reduced penalty from 100% to 10%	Senator Randolph
Size, lighting and spacing to be set by agreement	Senator Randolph
"Consistent with customary use" criteria	Representative Tuten
Just compensation required	Senate and House Committees

In its finalized form, the Highway Beautification Act placed restrictions on the size, spacing, and lighting of roadside billboards, allowed the masking of junkyards or garbage dumps to preserve roadside beauty, and the authorization of use of the Highway Trust Fund for landscaping and recreation services within the right-of-way. The Highway Beautification Act was signed into law by President Johnson October 22, 1965.

== Highway Beautification Act Implementation History and Amendments ==
=== Agency hearings – 1966 ===
The Bureau of Public Roads, (Federal Highway Administration's predecessor agency), held public hearings on the Act and its implementation in each state during March–May, 1966. The Federal Register for January 29, 1966, which announced the schedule for these hearings, also contained draft standards, allegedly for discussion purposes at the hearings. The draft standards were very restrictive, including size limits of 300 or 400 square feet (37 m^{2}), 500-foot (150 m) spacing between signs, 250 or 500-foot (150 m) spacing from at-grade intersections, and an unzoned area requirement that a sign on unzoned land must be within 300 feet (91 m) of two commercial or industrial activities. Both Congress and the outdoor advertising industry pointed out that there was no legislative authority for national standards, and that the suggested draft standards would be prohibitive.

During the remainder of 1966, the Bureau of Public Roads studied the results of the public hearings, conferred with interested parties, and on January 10, 1967 reported proposed standards to the Congress as required by Section 303(b) of the Act.

The proposed standards were almost as restrictive as the draft standards of January 29, 1966. Size was increased to 650 square feet (60 m^{2}) and spacing based on the average city block was increased to two signs per block. The unzoned commercial and industrial area definition still two signs per block. The unzoned commercial and industrial area definition still required two commercial or industrial activities within 300 feet.

=== Congressional hearings – 1967 ===
The hue and cry was resounding in opposition to the proposed standards. On March 3, 1967, Chairman John C. Kluczynski (Illinois) of the House Subcommittee on Roads wrote to the state Governors assuring them that there would be no penalty for failure to comply by the January 1, 1968, deadline set in the Act. On March 20, 1967 Chairman Kluczynski and ranking minority member William C. Cramer announced that the Committee would hold hearings which commenced on April 5, 1967. Close to 200 people testified or offered written statements resulting in a transcript of nearly 1,100 pages.

The Senate Subcommittee on Roads also held hearings during June and July, 1967. Although not as extensive as the House hearings, testimony and exhibits covered 462 pages.

Perhaps the only concrete result of the two hearings was contained in a letter from Secretary Alan S. Boyd, of Transportation, to Chairman Kluczynski, dated May 25, 1967, which contained this statement:

With regard to the determination of what constituted 'customary use' in the zoned commercial and industrial areas, we shall be glad to look to the States for certification that either the State authority or a bona fide local zoning authority has made such a determination.

This statement led to the 1968 amendment which permits certification of local zoning controls.

=== 1968 amendments ===
The Federal-Aid Highway Act of 1968 made one important amendment to the Highway Beautification Act. The following was added to Section 131(d):

"Whenever a bona fide State, county or local zoning authority has made a determination of customary use, such determination will be accepted in lieu of controls by agreement in the zoned commercial and industrial areas within the geographical jurisdiction of such authority."

This amendment put into law the essence of a letter dated May 24, 1967, from Secretary of Transportation Alan Boyd to Chairman John Kluczynski of the House Subcommittee on Roads:

With regard to the determination of what constitutes customary use in the zoned commercial and industrial areas, we shall be glad to look to the States for certification that either the State authority or a bona fide local zoning authority has made such a determination."

This letter led to the FHWA procedure relating to certification of local zoning controls, by which a state could certify that a zoning authority had size, spacing and lighting criteria for signs in commercial and industrial areas, and enforced these criteria. In such situations, the local controls would govern, rather than those in the state agreement. The local controls could be stricter, less strict, or similar to the state controls.

One other amendment of note was contained in the 1968 Act, a provision that no sign could be required to be removed if the Federal share for compensation was not available.

=== Nonconforming signs issue ===
The magnitude of illegal and nonconforming sign removals under the HBA of 1965 was first identified in the 1966 nationwide inventory conducted by the Bureau of Public Roads. From the list of the 1.1 million outdoor advertising signs on state inventories, nearly 840,000 were found to be illegal or nonconforming and 260,000 were located in commercial and industrial areas (conforming signs).

Under the original HBA, there were two categories of nonconforming signs, nonconforming "compensable" and nonconforming "grandfathered."

A nonconforming "compensable" sign was lawfully erected but did not comply with the provisions of state law or regulations passed at a later date. These signs violated zoning or land use provisions and generally were located in rural areas (i.e. agricultural and residential land uses). The removal of such signs require just (cash) compensation.

A nonconforming "grandfathered" sign was a sign located in an otherwise legal location (i.e. commercial and industrial area), that was nonconforming due to size, space or lighting restrictions. Such signs could remain, and did not have to be removed. A grandfathered sign was allowed at its particular location for the duration of its normal life subject to customary maintenance. If removed by a state or locality, the sign required just compensation.

=== Federal/state sign agreements ===
On April 1, 1967, the United States Department of Transportation was formed out of elements taken from the Department of Commerce, and the Bureau of Public Roads became the Federal Highway Administration (FHWA). Alan Boyd was named Secretary of Transportation and Lowell Bridwell became the new Federal Highway Administrator.

In June 1967, FHWA began negotiating with the various states to execute the size, lighting, and spacing agreements pursuant to section 131(d) of the Act. The first two agreements, executed on June 28, 1967, were with Vermont and Rhode Island. Both were more restrictive than later agreements; Vermont forewarned of its later posture by prohibiting all signs on the Interstate.

The Virginia agreement became the model for later agreements. Size was set at 1,200 square feet (110 m^{2}), the 500, 300, and 100-foot (30 m) spacing criteria were established, and the unzoned area definition required one activity within 500 feet (150 m) and located on the same side of the highway.

Negotiations with the various states continued through 1971; the last agreement signed through these negotiations was with Texas, on May 2, 1972.

=== FHWA's restudy, 1969–1970 ===
In January 1969, Former Governor John A. Volpe of Massachusetts replaced Alan Boyd as US Secretary of Transportation. On June 24, 1969, Secretary Volpe, in testimony before the Senate Subcommittee on Roads, announced that the Department would restudy the highway beautification program.

Controversies over the program, primarily relating to outdoor advertising control, had led to a decline of interest by all parties. Funds to carry out the three phases of the program had not been authorized or appropriated for two years. The uncertainty at the Federal level had caused the individual states to question the sincerity of the Federal Government in mandating protection of the highway environment.

The FHWA Restudy Report was submitted to the Congress in September 1970. Its major recommendations were:

- Continuation of the program at its present scope, with adequate funding.
- Elimination of the 660-foot (200 m) control zone in rural areas
- Change in penalty to 1 percent per year, cumulative, to 10 percent maximum
- Continue mandatory compensation
- Allow tourist-oriented signs under national standards.

The only change in Federal law recommended by the FHWA Restudy Report and later adopted by the Congress was the elimination of the 660-foot (200 m) control zone in rural areas.

=== The Volpe rejuvenation, 1969–1970 ===
When he took office in January 1969, Secretary of Transportation John Volpe had reservations about the future of the highway beautification program. Later he was convinced, primarily by Doug Snarr, an outdoor operator in Utah, that the program had merit and should be enforced. On July 1, 1970, the Administration's highway bill was introduced in the Senate, calling for the amendments recommended in the FHWA Report and Restudy, which demonstrated substantial finding for outdoor advertising control.

On February 4, 1971, Secretary Volpe wrote to the Governors of the states not yet in compliance with the Act and warned them that the 10 percent penalty would be forthcoming if the states failed to comply. The year 1971 experienced a frenzy of activity; 11 states resisted Volpe's edict to the point of demanding hearings, which were held between August and October. By March 1972, all states except South Dakota had complied with the outdoor advertising provisions of the HBA.

=== 1970 funding amendments ===
The Federal-Aid Highway Act of 1970 did not approve any substantive amendments to the HBA but created the Highway Beautification Commission and, for the first time, authorized substantial funding for the program:

- Fiscal year 1971 $27.0 million
- Fiscal year 1972 $20.5 million
- Fiscal year 1973 $50.0 million

=== The Highway Beautification Commission, 1971–1973 ===
The commission was created by the Federal-Aid Highway Act of 1970 (P.L. 91-605) and began operating late in 1971. There were 11 members; four from the Senate, four from the House of Representatives, and three public members appointed by the President.

Members were:

- Rep. Jim Wright
- Chairman Mr. Alfred Bloomingdale
- Mrs. Marion Fuller Brown
- Sen. James L. Buckley
- Rep. Don H. Clausen
- Sen. Mike Gravel
- Rep. Kenneth J. Gray
- Rep. Wilmer D. Mizell
- Sen. Jennings Randolph
- Mr. Michael Rapuano
- Sen. Robert T. Stafford

Rep. Ed Edmondson, Rep. Fred Schwengel, Sen. Birch Bayh and Sen. Lowell P. Weicker, Jr., were members when the Commission was originally formed; they were replaced when not reelected, or when they resigned from the commission.

The Commission held seven public hearings: in Atlanta; Los Angeles; St. Louis; Meriden, Connecticut; Syracuse, New York; Iowa City, Iowa; and Washington, D.C.

These hearings were attended by more than 1,000 people and more than 200 witnesses gave verbal or written testimony. Recommendations were received from a wide spectrum of the public, 35 state highway departments, 15 other state agencies, and seven Federal agencies.

The Commission also sponsored several symposiums dealing with such subjects as the aesthetic considerations in the design of new and existing highways, landscaping and planning aspects of highway beautification, and the possible need for regulation of on-premises signs. Individuals representing a wide range of expertise and opinion were invited to participate.

Two public opinion surveys were sponsored by the Commission. They were undertaken by deKadt Marketing and Research, Inc., Greenwich, Connecticut; and by Sindlinger and Company, Swarthmore, Pennsylvania. The purpose of these surveys was to determine the general public attitude regarding highway beautification, priorities which the public felt should be placed on expenditures of funds for beautification, and informational needs of motorists while traveling.

In August 1972, the Commission issued an interim report and recommendations:

- Eliminate the 660-foot (200 m) control zone in rural areas
- Improve motorist information systems
- Eliminate the hiatus period, 1965 to 1968, where compensation was not required, by requiring compensation for any sign "lawfully erected under state law"
- Steady funding
- State and local governments were urged to study on-premises controls

On December 31, 1973, the Commission issued its final report. The report, in addition to the above recommendations, made several suggestions on motorist services information, and recommended that the Secretary have the option of assessing less than a 10 percent penalty.

The only two recommendations of the Commission that resulted in substantial changes in the Federal law were the elimination of the 660-foot (200 m) control zone in rural areas and making compensation mandatory for all lawfully erected signs, thereby eliminating the hiatus period from 1965 to 1968.

=== 1974 amendments ===
The Administration's proposal to incorporate the 1973 Commission's recommendations was submitted to Congress as the Highway Beautification Act of 1974, S. 3161. The bill was later incorporated into the Federal-Aid Highway Act of 1974 (P.L. 93-643), signed on January 4, 1975.

The 1974 Act extended outdoor advertising controls beyond 660 feet (200 m) outside of urban areas. This extension of control was limited to those signs visible from the main traveled way of the controlled highway and erected with the purpose of their message being read from such main traveled way.

The Act also eliminated the "hiatus period" by requiring compensation for any sign lawfully erected under state law.

Also, so-called "landmark signs" (artistic or historic significance), or signs painted on barns were allowed, containing messages such as "Chew Mail Pouch Tobacco."

The Act authorized $50 million for fiscal year 1975.

=== The 1976 amendments ===
The Federal -Aid Highway Act of 1976 (P.L. 94 - 280) contained a number of minor amendments:

- Subsection 131 (o) was added, permitting retention of certain nonconforming directional-message signs in specific areas where sign removal would create a substantial economic hardship. FHWA was required to approve the retention.
- Logo signs (specific service signs) were permitted on federal-aid primary highway rights-of-way, limited to four categories of gas, food, lodging and camping. The original HBA of 1965 allowed logos on interstates only.
- Federal financing was provided for signs moved to beyond 660 feet (200 m) and made nonconforming by the 1974 Act.

The act authorized $25 million per year for fiscal years 1977 and 1978.

=== The 1978 amendments ===
The 1978 Amendments were the culmination of several years of sign ordinance battles and legal opinions between the FHWA, the outdoor advertising industry and states over the issue of removing signs without payment of just compensation.

The history of the amendments can be traced to February 26, 1974, when the Mayor of Madison, WI, approved an ordinance prohibiting outdoor advertising in the city and amortizing all existing signs over a term of years and not paying just compensation for the signs upon removal.

On September 20, 1974, the Wisconsin Department of Transportation requested an opinion from the FHWA as to whether the state was obligated to pay just compensation for any or all of the signs to be removed under the Madison ordinance.

On December 21, 1974, FHWA Regional Counsel Roger Brady issued an opinion to the effect that the state was not required to pay for signs rendered nonconforming under state or local law. Thus Wisconsin would not be penalized if Madison removed signs along HBA-controlled highways without compensation.

The outdoor advertising industry expressed to FHWA its dismay with the Brady opinion on various occasions. On May 12, 1975, a lengthy legal opinion prepared by OAAA's counsel, Pierson, Ball & Dowd, was delivered to FHWA, pointing out the fallacy of the Brady opinion.

On July 15, 1975, FHWA Chief Counsel, David E. Wells, withdrew the Brady opinion as "inappropriately issued." He stated that the matter was best left to state courts to resolve, since it involved the relationship of municipal law to state law.

On December 8, 1976, FHWA issued an opinion which said that "a state is only subject to the penalties in 23 U.S.C. 131 when compensation is not paid for the removal of lawful signs under laws passed to comply with the Act." This opinion meant that signs removed under local zoning ordinances could be removed without compensation.

The year 1977 saw many attempts to rectify the inequity of the December 8, 1976, FHWA position. Finally, the issue resulted in a meeting on September 13, 1977, with US Transportation Secretary Brock Adams. Although key Congressional leaders who had been active in the passage of the 1965 Act agreed that the December 8, 1976, FHWA legal opinion did not reflect Congressional intent, no change to the FHWA position was made.

In the early days of the 95th Congress, second session (1978), compensation amendments were drafted and included in both the Senate and House bills. On the House side, amendments were approved by the Public Works Committee and were in the bill reported to the full House. In the Senate, however, the amendments were opposed by Vermont Sen. Robert T. Stafford, who offered a substitute amendment during full committee mark up, which was accepted by the full committee and by the Senate. Under Stafford's amendment, compensation was not guaranteed for any sign which at one time conformed to the 1965 Act. That would have meant no compensation for most signs in commercial or industrial areas.

On September 22, 1978, the most significant threat to the compensation amendments surfaced during the House floor debate. Rep. Peter H. Kostmayer (PA) offered an amendment which would have deleted proposed amendments to the HBA, including those on compensation. After extensive debate, the Kostmayer amendment was defeated, 199 to 76.

Although a number of key Congressmen spoke on behalf of the industry position, the following statement of subcommittee chairman Jim Howard sums up the issue most eloquently:

"Madam Chairman, I believe the crux of the issue is equity. This House, and the Congress as a whole, have repeatedly said that individual owners must be compensated for the taken of their property. The provision in the committee bill merely reaffirms what has always been the congressional intent."

The just compensation issue was debated by the Conference Committee and resolved in favor of the House position to require just compensation for any lawfully erected sign removed by a state or locality on a controlled highway.

Previously, there were two categories of signs considered nonconforming: nonconforming "compensable" and nonconforming "grandfathered". Due to the 1978 Amendments, the status of some billboards changed due to a locality enacting more restrictive sign ordinance than the state criteria. These are labeled as 1978 Amendment signs. Generally, signs in this category are not placed in the legal, conforming categories under federal or state requirements. As with other nonconforming signs, the removal of such signs require the payment of just compensation.

The just compensation amendment was part of the Surface Transportation Assistance Act of 1978 (P.L. 95 - 599). In addition to the requirement that just (cash) compensation be paid for the removal of lawfully erected signs the Act was also amended: 1) to allow electronic variable message on-premises signs in bonus states; and 2) created a new category of exempt signs that advertise "free coffee" by nonprofit organizations.

=== Federal Highway Administration hearings ===
On November 27, 1978, Deputy Federal Highway Administrator John S. Hassell announced that FHWA intended to reassess the Highway Beautification Program. The reassessment included holding a series of hearings throughout the country, along with the appointment of a National Commission to review the program and provide recommendations for its future direction.

The formal announcement appeared in the Federal Register on April 30, 1979, and the first hearings were held simultaneously by FHWA staff on June 5, 1979, in Boston, Chicago, and Portland, Oregon. Hearings were held during subsequent weeks in Baltimore, Kansas City, San Francisco, Atlanta, Dallas, Denver and New York City. The final hearing took place in Washington, D.C., on July 10 and 11, 1979.

Testimony may be summarized as follows:

- At the 11 hearings, 435 people testified.
- The general public did not respond to the hearings.
- Approximately 90 percent of those testifying favored continuation of the Highway Beautification Act and were supportive of outdoor advertising in general.
- FHWA maintained a docket for the reassessment program. There were over 1,100 submissions to the docket. Thirty-one of these were by State Highway Departments or, in two cases, the Governor, on behalf of the highway department.

FHWA reviewed these submissions to determine the consensus of the states in three areas: the Stafford bill (S.344), just compensation, and vegetation clearance.

=== The Stafford Bill (3.344) ===
==== State views ====
Seventeen states supported the Stafford bill or its concept of eliminating mandatory just compensation and having an optional Federal program. Six opposed the Stafford Bill. Eight had no position or no comment.

==== Just compensation - state views ====
Five states indicated the 1978 compensation amendments offered them no problem. Four had no comment. The remaining 22 states had critical comments ranging from indicating that the 1978 amendments could cause problems to outright opposition. Two states questioned the constitutionality of the 1978 amendments.

==== Vegetation clearance – state views ====
Fourteen states favored allowing some clearing, minor trimming or purchase of blocked signs, or approved of present Federal Highway Administration policy leaving the decision up to the states. Eight opposed the idea of clearing vegetation in front of signs and the existing Federal Highway Administration policy. Nine states had no comment or no position, or stated they had no problem.

==== The Stafford Bill, 344 – 1979 ====
S.344 was introduced by Sen. Robert T. Stafford of Vermont of February 6, 1979. It was referred to the Senate Committee on Environment and Public Works. After introduction, Sens. Howard Baker of Tennessee and Pete Dominici of New Mexico joined as co-sponsors.

Briefly, the bill would have had the following effect:

- Control of outdoor advertising would be optional.
- Payment of just compensation would be optional.
- No mandatory 10 percent penalty.
- Would provide for further application of the right-of way logo signs along the primary system.
- Continuation of bonus payments by FHWA.

Hearings were held by the Senate Subcommittee on Transportation on July 17 and 18, 1979. Witnesses in favor of S.344 included a number of environmental and garden club representatives. Witnesses in opposition included former Federal Highway Administrator Bill Cox, and former US Secretary of Transportation John Volpe, who made a statement in favor of continuing the program and requiring the payment of just compensation.

==== The Stafford Bill, S.1641-1980 ====
Sen. Stafford did not end his efforts with this setback. On June 2, 1980, he offered an amendment to S. 1641, a hydroelectric power bill, which in essence copied S. 344. It failed.

==== National Advisory Committee on Outdoor Advertising and Motorist Information, 1979–1981 ====
During the same time frame that Sen. Stafford was introducing outdoor advertising control legislation, the Federal Highway Administration announced the formation of the National Advisory Committee on Outdoor Advertising and Motorist Information in the Federal Register on July 12, 1979.

The committee reviewed all information received through the 1979 FHWA public hearings as well as information received into the public docket. In addition, during the Committee's deliberations, 144 statements were made by the general public to the docket and 81 reports were filed by the FHWA staff.

The committee met six times between May 1980, and June 1981. The meetings, marked by intense debate and discussion, lasted two days each. Two of the six meetings were held by outside Washington, D.C., in Atlanta and Chicago.

During the Chicago meeting, the committee toured the Foster & Kleiser plant in Chicago, IL to see first hand the production and construction of billboards.

===== Committee debate and recommendations =====
Early in the deliberations it became apparent that the membership of the full committee was generally divided into two strongly committed but divergent groups. One industry-oriented group favored retention of the present Highway Beautification Act based on its results; supported mandatory compensation for sign removal; and agreed that roadside and tourist oriented businesses were entitled to relief from unfairly severe sign restrictions.

The environmental-oriented group was critical of the Highway Beautification Act; felt that the Act tried to cover too much territory; wanted to return major responsibility for billboard control to state and local governments with greatly relaxed compensation requirements such as amortization; and strongly supported alternative information systems in place of traditional outdoor advertising signs.

In order to organize the options into coherent packages, the Committee formed two subcommittees: Administrative and Legislative, and directed the subcommittees to develop reports and recommendations to the full Committee. The Administrative Subcommittee was composed of industry and tourist-oriented members; the Legislative Subcommittee was composed primarily of environmental-oriented members.

During the final meeting of the full Committee, the members discussed the subcommittee reports, weighed the alternatives available for improving the Highway Beautification Program, and then voted on the recommendations. The balanced nature of the Committee was reflected in the closeness of the votes between utilizing administrative procedures to change to the program or proposing changes to the law. The voting revealed the split opinions of the group and provided sometimes contradictory results. In many instances the votes did not give any clear direction for the future of the program.

The final report of the National Advisory Committee, at best, can be described as confusing; at worst, conflicting. For example, on the first day of its final meeting, the committee, by a vote of 11 to 8, recommended that further sign removals be made optional with the individual states and later rejected a similar recommendation that would have made the payment of just compensation also optional. The following day, the Committee recommended, by a vote of 12 to 10, deregulation of municipalities over 25,000 and urban cities. This would have allowed the use of amortization in these jurisdictions. A short while later, by a vote 12 to t 1, the committee rejected a recommendation which would permit amortization and levy a Federal user tax on nonconforming signs.

The National Advisory Committee Report was submitted to the FHWA in late 1981 at the same time as a new Administration. FHWA took no official action to follow up on the report and it died.

==== The Stafford Bill, S.1548–1981 ====
On July 30, 1981, Stafford introduced S. 1548, the Billboard Deregulation Act of 1981, which would have repealed the Highway Beautification Act of 1965. In August 1981, he announced that this bill would be offered as an amendment to S. 1024, the highway bill.

However, mark up of the highway bill took place on September 30, 1981, without the Stafford amendment being offered.

==== Deregulation amendment, H.R. 6211-1982 ====
In order to counter any possible reintroduction of Sen. Stafford's deregulation bill, S.1548, OAAA drafted a deregulation bill, which was inserted into the proposed House highway bill, HR 6211.

HR 6211 proposed that:

- Signs would be limited to commercial and industrial areas or to unzoned commercial and industrial areas as the state deemed appropriate. The existing exempt categories found in current subsection 131(c) were retained. The states would no longer spell out details of control in zoned and unzoned commercial and industrial areas, as required by the Federal/State agreement.
- Signs could not be erected in areas where funds had been expended to cause their removal.
- The compensation provisions of the current law would protect sign owners from the impairment of the customary use of signs by allowing maintenance of signs. States would be required to pay compensation to cover these situations.
- The states were encouraged to provide for scenic areas where signs were not permitted.
- The Governor of each state would certify the state's program to the Secretary of Transportation. The Secretary's oversight would be limited to assuring that the state made a proper certification and controlled signs in accord with the certification. The penalty provision of the current law was retained to permit the Secretary to enforce the law.

The section made no changes to the 1958 bonus program, the specific information signing (logo) program, or the information center program.

The amendment encountered considerable opposition from environmentalists and in the press. Although it passed the House, it was opposed strenuously in the Senate, primarily by Sen. Stafford, and it was withdrawn during the House - Senate conference in December 1982.

==== Funding amendments, 1983 and 1984 ====
In 1983 and 1984 there were attempts to provide a new funding source for the program, from the Highway Trust Fund instead of the General Fund. All such attempts failed.

==== The Gorton Bill, S. 1494 - 1985 ====
On July 25, 1985, Sen. Slade Gorton of Washington introduced a bill which would have radically amended the Highway Beautification Act. The bill, S.1494, was cosponsored by Sens. Chafee (RI), Evans (WA), Hatfield (OR), lnouye (HI), Matsunaga (HI), Moynihan (NY), and Wilson (CA).

The bill proposed that:

- Compensation would be at the state option and amortization would be allowed. No federal funds would be expended if compensation was paid-100 percent by state funds.
- Nonconforming signs and conforming signs erected after July 1985, in commercial and industrial zones would be removed by the end of the next state legislative session. Signs in unzoned commercial and industrial areas would be removed by 1990.
- Elimination of federal-state agreements for signs in commercial and industrial areas. No new billboards would be permitted.
- Mandatory penalty for permitting vegetation cutting on state-owned right of way.
- Mandatory 10 percent penalty. No Secretarial discretion.
- Retention of bonus controls and payments. However, no funds were appropriated for bonus payments.

Senator Gorton testified on behalf of his bill before the Senate Committee on Environment and Public Works on May 20, 1986.

A number of states responded that the legislation would be very costly. As an example, CALTRANS provided an analysis that the bill could cost the state $45 million by the close of the next state legislature.

After the state views were made known, the Gorton bill was never given serious consideration.

==== Administration Bill, 1986 ====
The Administration's proposed highway bill was submitted to the Congress on February 5, 1986. It contained extensive amendments to the Highway Beautification Act. These included:

- The Act would apply to rural areas only.
- Signs in commercial and industrial areas would be allowed only in areas actually used for commercial and industrial purposes. Size, lighting and spacing standards were not required.
- Tourist-oriented directional signs (TODS) would be allowed under state standards on highway rights of way. If a TODS applicant for a permit also owned nonconforming signs, one billboard was to be removed without compensation before receiving a permit for one TODS.
- Nonconforming signs on the Interstate system were to be removed in five years.
- The DOT Secretary could withhold highway approvals for failure to comply.
- The payment of just compensation was optional by the state. Federal funds would come from the state's highway apportionment.
- Bonus payments would be discontinued. Bonus states would be required to continue controls or pay back bonus payments already received.

The Administration Bill was never accorded serious consideration in Congress but did precipitate extensive action on the outdoor advertising issue in 1986.

==== The Stafford Bill, S.2405–1986 ====
The Senate highway bill, S.2405, was introduced by Sen. Symms and five cosponsors on May 6, 1986. At the time of its introduction, it contained no highway beautification amendments.

On July 22, 1986, the Senate Committee on Environment and Public Works met to mark up the highway bill. At that time, Sen. Stafford, joined by Sens. Bentsen (TX) and Moynihan (NY), offered amendments to the Highway Beautification Act which included:

- Elimination of the mandatory requirement for the payment of just compensation. State and local governments could use their police power to remove lawfully erected signs.
- Prohibition of new signs to be erected after July 1, 1986, or the effective date of the state's compliance law.
- Prohibition of all vegetation control on the right of way for the purpose of sign visibility
- Requirement of an updated inventory of existing signs.
- Requirement for the prompt removal of illegal signs and those billboards which had been paid for.
- Prohibition of sign maintenance which would improve the visibility or useful life.
- Prohibition of the use of materials from a purchased sign in building a new sign.
- Requirement of warning labels, if required on other ads.
- Making the penalty discretionary, up to 5 percent of the state's highway funding apportionment.

During mark up, there was considerable discussion on the need for signs in rural areas for directional purposes. It was apparent that a consensus would not be reached, and the committee recessed.

On the following day, July 23, 1986, a new section was added by Sen. Stafford which provided that the Secretary shall not require any further removals of nonconforming signs. After virtually no discussion, a vote was taken, and the Stafford amendment was approved, nine to four. Those voting against the amendment were Sens. Symms (ID), Abdnor (SD), Burdick (ND), and Simpson (WY).

==== The Shaw Bill, HR 3129 – 1986 ====
On August 6, 1986, during the floor debate on the House highway bill, HR3129, Rep. Clay Shaw (R-FL) offered an amendment to the Highway Beautification Act. Rep. Shaw had offered a similar amendment earlier, which had been rejected by the House Committee on Public Works and Transportation. The Shaw amendment, which was very similar to the Administration bill, provided:

The Act would apply to rural areas only.

- Signs in commercial and industrial areas would be allowed only in areas actually used primarily for commercial and industrial purposes with DOT definition for "actual use." Size, lighting and spacing standards were not required.
- Tourist-oriented directional signs (TODS) would be allowed under state standards on highway rights of way. The Secretary would define TODS and approve areas for placement. If an applicant for a TODS permit also owns nonconforming signs, one such sign was to be removed with compensation before receiving a permit for a TODS.
- Vegetation control would be prohibited.
- Nonconforming signs would be removed by the end of 1991.
- Illegal signs would be removed within 90 days.
- The DOT Secretary could withhold approvals for failure to comply.
- Just compensation would be optional for states. Federal funds were made available from a state's highway funds apportionment.
- Bonus payments would be discontinued. Bonus states would be required to continue controls or payback bonus payments already received.

On August 7, 1986, Rep. Bud Shuster (R-PA) offered a substitute to the Shaw amendment. After considerable debate, the Shuster substitute was accepted by a vote of 251 to 159.

==== Shuster substitute, HR 3129 – 1986 ====
The approved Shuster substitute provided for:

- A change in the compliance penalty to a sliding scale of five to 10 percent. The DOT'S authority to suspend a penalty was removed.
- Requirement of an annual state inventory or permit system to identify unlawful signs.
- Requirement that "illegal signs" be removed within 90 days.
- Prohibition of vegetation control, except under standards set by Secretary; a sign became unlawful if an owner was proven to illegally cut for a sign's visibility. Prohibition on sign modification to improve visibility or useful life; routine maintenance permitted.
- Except for new replacement signs, no new signs could be erected in commercial and industrial areas after January 1, 1987. The number of signs in commercial and industrial areas in the state was frozen as of January 1, 1987. Subject to state law, existing lawful signs could be moved to new locations in commercial and industrial areas. For this purpose, unzoned commercial or industrial areas would only be recognized if established prior to 1/1/87. Just compensation was not required for signs erected after 1/1/87 and before a state complied with Federal Law.
- The Secretary would be precluded from requiring a state to remove lawfully erected nonconforming signs, but the states would not be precluded from such action.
- Mandatory compensation would be retained with funding from the state's construction or 4R funds. The federal share was 75 percent or less, as agreed.
- Prohibition on the use of sign materials acquired by a state from being reused for new signs.
- Clarification of control on public lands but exempted certain lands held in trust for Indian nations.
- Elimination of the provision that Federal funds must be available before signs could be required to be removed.

Following passage, the highway bill and Shuster Substitute went to a House-Senate conference. Although the Conferees met a number of times, they could not agree on a final highway bill by the time Congress adjourned. The highway beautification amendments were not part of the controversy preventing agreement by the Conferees.

==== 1987 amendments, HR 2 & Stafford, S.185/387-1987 ====
===== H.R. 2 =====
Failure by the 99th Congress to pass a highway bill put tremendous pressure on the 100th Congress to do so because of the need for funding the nation's highways. The House responded by passing of HR 2 on January 21, 1987, which was virtually identical to the 1986 bill, HR 3129. There were no committee hearings, and little or no debate. The Highway Beautification Act amendments were the same as those in HR3129; only the dates were changed.

===== Stafford, S.185/387-1987 =====
The Senate Highway Bill, S.185, contained no Highway Beautification amendments when introduced.

Mark up of S.185 in the Senate Committee took place on January 21, 1987, at which time Sen. Stafford offered an amendment to the Highway Beautification Act. The amendment was virtually identical to that contained in the 1986 Senate bill. After approximately one hour of debate, the amendment was voted on, with an eight-to-eight result. The tie prevented reporting the amendment to the Senate floor.

On February 3, 1987, during floor debate of the Senate bill, now S.387, Sen. Stafford offered another amendment, co-sponsored by Sens. Bentsen (TX), Chafee (RI), Evans (WA), Moynihan (NY) and Wilson (CA). The amendment was similar to the 1986 Senate bill, with several major changes. These were:

- Moratorium on new signs in rural areas
- New boards up to 75 square feet (7.0 m^{2}) would be allowed only in urban areas.
- A ban on new boards within 2,500 feet (760 m) of National Parks, etc.
- Compensation required for removals required under Highway Beautification Act provisions; not required for other removals by localities.

After one hour of debate, Sen. Wendell Ford (KY) moved to table the amendment, and the Senate agreed, 57 to 40. This resulted in no Highway Beautification Act amendments in the Senate bill.

The House - Senate Conferees met on March 10, 1987, and decided not to amend the Highway Beautification Act, and all such amendments passed by the House of Representatives were dropped from the highway bill.

==== Lewis/Shaw amendments, HR 3389 – 1989 ====
On October 24, 1989, Reps. John Lewis (D-GA) and Clay Shaw (R-FL) introduced the most sweeping anti-billboard legislation ever proposed. The proposal, HR3389, the Billboard Control Act of 1989, would:

- Place a moratorium on the construction of new billboards beginning in 1995.
- Allow states and localities to remove signs without paying "cash" compensation.
- Prohibit the cutting or trimming of vegetation and trees to improve the visibility of billboards.
- Require annual sign inventories by the states and a report by the US Department of Transportation.
- Provide for the removal of all nonconforming billboards in existence after September 1, 1995.

No votes were taken on the proposal.

==== Chafee amendment, S.2500–1990 ====
The outdoor advertising program sustained continued scrutiny during the 2nd session of the 101st Congress. Sen. Chafee (R-RI), along with seven co-sponsors, introduced the "Visual Pollution Control Act of 1990," S.2500. The proposal included provisions to:

- Eliminate the mandatory 10 percent penalty and replace it with a discretionary penalty.
- Require an annual inventory by the states.
- Mandate the removal of illegal and nonconforming signs with 90 days of enactment.
- Prohibit vegetation control in front of billboards by states.
- Ban modifications of nonconforming signs.
- Ban new signs after Oct. 1, 1990.
- Make payment for sign removal discretionary by the states.
- Provide funding from the Highway Trust Fund for sign removal.

In November, 1990, the Senate Environment and Public Works Committee voted 11-4 in favor of the Chafee amendment. However, Congress adjourned before any other action was taken.

==== Administration amendments – 1991 ====
On February 13, 1991, Secretary of Transportation Samuel Skinner submitted to Congress the Administration's highway and transportation bill.

Within Title 1 of the proposed Federal-Aid Highway Act of 1991, section 116, Outdoor Advertising, and Section 109, General Provisions, amended outdoor advertising control provisions. Significant changes included:

- Elimination of the just compensation provision of the Highway Beautification Act. States could be reimbursed for sign acquisition costs on controlled, rural highways only. Cash compensation would come from the Highway Trust Fund.
- Requirement for a sign inventory in rural areas of effective control. New highways for billboard controls to be added.
- Ban on new signs (i.e. a permanent freeze) on rural, controlled highways. No exception made for signs in commercial and industrial areas. Nonconforming signs were not required to be removed in rural areas. No sign control within urbanized areas.
- The mandatory 10 percent penalty was changed to a discretionary penalty on a project basis.
- Nonconforming signs could not be changed to improve visibility or prolong useful life. Modification of nonconforming signs must adhere to new Federal requirements.
- Illegal or acquired signs must be removed within 90 days.

==== House and Senate amendments – 1991 ====
The Visual Pollution Control Act of 1991 was identical to the 1990 Senate proposal, S. 2500. On March 7, 1991, Reps. Clay Shaw (R-FL) and John Lewis (D - GA) reintroduced HR 1344 to conform to the Senate version. A companion bill (S.593 subsequently changed to S.965) was introduced in the Senate by Sen. John Chafee (R - RI). The bills had 28 co-sponsors in the House and 10 Senate co-sponsors when introduced, along with 40 organizations supporting the anti-billboard amendments.

The Shaw/Lewis and Chafee proposal would:

- Place a moratorium on new billboard construction along Federal-Aid Primary and Interstate highways.
- Prohibit any vegetation control in front of billboards.
- Eliminate mandatory just compensation for a lawfully erected sign when removed by a state or locality.

At the Senate Committee mark up of the Surface Transportation Efficiency Act of 1991 (S.965) on May 22, 1991, the billboard amendment by Sen. Chafee was approved by a vote of 11-4. On June 3, 1991, Chairman Burdick (D-ND), reported the Surface Transportation Efficiency Act of 1991 out of committee. The bill number was changed to S.1204 and Section 137, Visual Pollution Control, was the amended Chafee proposal.

==== Reid amendment to S.1204 ====
On June 12, 1991, the Senate voted on a floor amendment offered by Sen. Harry Reid (D-NV) to strike section 137 (the Chafee language) in its entirety. The vote was over the merits of just compensation for billboards. The Senate's favorable vote by a margin of 60 - 39 supported Sen. Reid and the outdoor advertising industry.

The Senate passed its entire bill (S. 1204) on June 19. However, the House version of the Surface Transportation Act was pulled from a vote on August 1, after becoming entangled over a 5 cent per gallon gasoline increase.

==== Andrews amendment, HR 2950 ====
Rep. Andrews (D-TX) drafted an amendment to HR 2950 which would have required:

- An "actual use" requirement to allow billboards in all zoned commercial and industrial areas as well as eliminating the unzoned area designations.
- No new sign within 2,500 feet (760 m) of a National Park or historic property
- No tree or vegetation removal in front of billboards.
- Removing the mandatory penalty and substituting a discretionary penalty of up to 10 percent

The amendment was never brought before the House Public Works Committee, nor the entire House. Instead, the House brought a bill to the Conference Committee without any change to outdoor advertising controls.

==== Intermodal Surface Transportation Efficiency Act of 1991 ====
The Conference Committee debated the highway and transportation issues and reached an agreement on November 27, 1991, on major changes to the transportation program in the Intermodal Surface Transportation Efficiency Act of 1991 (ISTEA). The billboard issue was debated by the House-Senate conferees and punitive billboard measures were kept out of the bill. HBA amendments agreed to were:

- Funding: If a state elects to do so, it may use its Highway Trust Funds as compensation for the removal of nonconforming signs. The Federal share is 80 percent. These funds will come from the same money source that funds highway maintenance and bridge repairs or from a new category of funding called Surface Transportation Funds. Billboard control is an eligible item under the Transportation Enhancements program.
- Illegal Signs: Owners of an illegal sign (unlawfully erected) must remove the sign 90 days after enactment of the bill or the State shall remove it and assess all costs to the owner.
- Control Routes: The Highway Beautification Act compliance applies to all signs on highways designated as the "Federal-aid primary" system as of June 1, 1991, and on any highway which is designated as part of the new National Highway System (NHS). Therefore, HBA controls will apply to the current 306,000 miles (492,000 km) or Interstate and Federal-aid primary highways and additional miles or newly designated NHS highways.
- State Compliance: Amendments made by the Amendment shall not affect the status or the validity of any existing state compliance law or regulation. States will not have to automatically submit their HBA laws for federal revisions.
- Scenic Byways: Prohibits the erection of new billboards on state designated scenic byways which are part of the interstate or primary system. Control of signs on such highways shall be in accordance with HBA control provisions.

==== Scenic Byways Advisory Committee ====
A 17-member Advisory Committee was established to assist the Secretary of Transportation in the establishment of a National Scenic Byways Program and All American Roads program. The Advisory Committee was required to submit a report to the Secretary no later than 18 months after ISTEA's enactment. The outdoor advertising industry was made a member of the Scenic Byways Advisory Committee. Other scenic byways and alternative sign issues included:

- An Interim Scenic Byways Program was also established and FHWA given authority to make grants to the states. Ten percent of these grants (up to $1 million in 1992, 1993, and 1994) were for sign removal under HBA controls. The Federal share for payment was to be 80 percent.
- Tourist Oriented Directional Signs: Directed the Secretary of Transportation to encourage the states to provide for equitable participation in the use of TODS and logos and included a one-year study.

==== Nonconforming sign amendment in the Dire Emergency Supplemental Appropriations Act of 1992 ====
The ink had hardly been dry on the December 18, 1991 ISTEA legislation before a DOT/FHWA interpretation of the new statute required an amendment to the Highway Beautification Act.

In January 1992, FHWA issued guidance to its field offices and the states concerning the new billboard control requirements. On February 20, 1992, the FHWA notified all state Governors that since ISTEA of 1991 made removal of nonconforming signs eligible for federal-aid highway funds, the states must use highway trust funds to remove all remaining nonconforming signs.

On March 6, 1992, the FHWA published a Federal Register Notice calling for the required removal of nonconforming signs within two years or risk losing 10 percent of their federal highway money. The estimated cost to remove 92,000 was $428 million. Each state was to provide an action plan to implement removals by June 18, 1992. In addition, illegal sign removal action and the billboard ban on scenic byways was included for comments.

Letters from key congressional leadership, Governors and other state officials, and billboard users protested this unilateral action by FHWA.

On May 8, 1992, the FHWA issued in the Federal Register a Notice of Proposed Rulemaking (NPRM) asking for comment on four sign removal options, but recommended proposed regulations that states remove all nonconforming signs by March 1994. The comment period was to expire on July 8, 1992.

On May 20, 1992, Sen. Steve Symms (R-ID) offered amendment No. 1849 to an emergency urban aid package. The Symms proposal was approved by voice vote in the Senate that same evening. The technical amendment to section 131(n) of the HBA provided that Federal funds for the removal of legal, nonconforming signs was at the states' discretion.

The amendment was uncontested. During the debate on the amendment, the American Road & Transportation Builders Association (ARBTA) provided a detailed analysis of the economic impact on jobs if billboards had to be removed and the resulting number of highway miles that would not be rehabilitated due to funds being used to remove billboards. Also, the travel and tourism industry voiced concern about the loss of advertising opportunities for their members, many dependent upon billboards. Rep, Bud Shuster (R-PA) offered a floor colloquy on June 18, which spelled out the House-Senate conferees intent.

On June 22, 1992, the President signed the Dire Emergency Supplemental Appropriations Act of 1992 (PL 102-302). The outdoor advertising amendment unequivocally negated the FHWA rulemaking notice of May 8, 1992, which made mandatory the removal of nonconforming signs.

FHWA then advised their field offices that there was no risk of penalty if a state chose not to acquire nonconforming signs. On July 16, 1992, the FHWA published in the Federal Register a deletion of all references to nonconforming sign removals. The illegal sign removal matter and the billboard ban on scenic byways rulemaking were not affected.

Throughout the entire rulemaking process, over 3,200 letters were submitted to the FHWA Docket. Nearly 90 percent were in support of the outdoor advertising industry position.

==== Scenic Byways National Advisory Committee of 1993 and 1995 Scenic Byways amendment ====
Similar to the nonconforming sign removal issue, one of the first actions taken by the Federal Highway Administration after enactment of ISTEA (December 18, 1991) was the issuance of a March 1992, advisory that construed the provisions of subsection (s) to prohibit the construction of all new billboards on any state-designated scenic byways. The FHWA prohibition included new billboards on any state-designated scenic byways. The FHWA prohibition included new billboards within commercial and industrial areas along scenic byway routes.

The billboard ban issue became a contentious issue during the 1993 National Scenic Byways Commission deliberations, primarily due to efforts by anti-billboard factions to insert the FHWA's rulemaking policy language into the Commission's Final Report that a mandatory ban on new billboards was required. Votes on the billboard ban issue reflected the divided nature of the Commission membership between government officials, business and tourism interests, and conservationists/preservationists.

The Committee's charge was to recommend to the Secretary of Transportation those minimum criteria by which state and federal agencies would designate and operate certain outstanding scenic byways as National Scenic Byways and All American Roads. The Commission's report focused on the identification and development of scenic byways that offer scenic, historic, natural, cultural, recreational, or archaeological values yet are a part of a voluntary, "Bottoms-up" grassroots effort, not a federal mandate.

The Committee's Final Report, issued in 1993, provided a program structure, designation process and criteria, funding recommendations, de-designation procedures, signing options, design standards, safety, and outdoor advertising control recommendations.

The outdoor advertising issue was the most difficult and contentious for the Committee to resolve. There was extensive debate over the interpretation of the existing laws as well as recommendations for a future national program. Formal votes were taken on several issues (with very close results) because consensus could not be reached.

A majority of the committee did not support a recommendation that the Secretary of Transportation require a demonstrated commitment not to add new billboards, but accepting those which were in place. The Committee then agreed that its vote should not be construed as meaning it favored new billboards. This motion referred to a prohibition of billboard construction on routes other than Interstate and federal-aid primary roads designed as national scenic byways.

A majority of the Committee did recommend that the Secretary of Transportation encourage the states to extend billboard controls to limit new billboard construction on the national designated routes, regardless of road system. This latter point was added by FHWA staff because of disagreement over the interpretation of ISTEA language.

A majority of the Committee recommended that corridor management plans for All-American Roads require states to effectively ban new billboards except in communities with over 25,000 population and to encourage the use of alternative business identification signs such as TODS and logos.

ISTEA and HBA controls would apply to a scenic byway designated in accordance with the nomination process as a national scenic byway or All-American Road on the Interstate or federal-aid primary highway even it was not designated pursuant to state law as a state scenic byway.

On June 14, 1993, FHWA reversed it earlier policy by issuing a "segmentation" policy that recognized state discretion to permit new billboards within commercial and industrial segments of state scenic byways. However, the FHWA policy was implemented in a sporadic and vague manner, resulting in broad confusion among the states concerning the scope of FHWA's authority in this area.

In late 1993, an amendment to clarify the scenic byways "segmentation" issue was included in the House Committee version of the HAZMAT bill. However, all amendments considered non-germane to the bill were dropped prior to the Floor vote.

===== 1995 amendment to Scenic Byways Controls =====
In 1995, the National Highway System Designation was under consideration by both the House and Senate. This legislation was required by ISTEA. The House of Representatives approved an amendment to subsection (s) of the HBA to clarify that the federal ban on new billboards on scenic byways did not restrict the authority of a state with respect to commercial and industrial areas along a scenic byway or roads designated pursuant to the original ISTEA language on the national scenic byways program.

The Senate bill contained no comparable provision and, after much debate by the Conference Committee, a substitute was agreed to which codified the FHWA'S June 14, 1993, policy implementation. The Conference Substitute language stated:

In designating a scenic byway for purposes of section 131(s) and section 1047 of the Intermodal Surface Transportation Efficiency Act of 1991, a state may exclude from such designation any segment of a highway that is inconsistent with the state's criteria for designating scenic byways. The exclusion of a highway segment must have a reasonable basis. The secretary of Transportation has the authority to prevent actions that evade Federal Requirements.

In effect, the final language codifies current FHWA policy to allow segmentation of non-scenic areas along a state designated or federally approved scenic byway so long as the state's determination is reasonable. Trail blazer signs and mapping of excluded segments is not prohibited.

Managerial language to accompany the Conference Substitute was printed in the Congressional Record, pages H 13324-25 on November 18, 1995, by Rep. Bud Shuster. The National Highway System Designation Act of 1995 (P.L. 104-59) was enacted into law on November 28, 1995.

==== Senator Jeffords amendment to S. 1173 (ISTEA Reauthorization of 1997) ====
On October 23, 1997, Sen. Jeffords filed seven amendments to S. 1173 the reauthorization of the highway and transportation program. The amendments did not come to a vote on the Senate Floor due to other pressing business. The amendments were:

===== Amendment 1403 =====
Placed a cap on the total number of billboards

===== Amendment 1405 =====
Prohibited state vegetation control programs

===== Amendment 1406 =====
Allowed a locality to remove legal signs with just compensation for signs erected after enactment

===== Amendment 1407 =====
Required each state to conduct an annual inventory that catalogs every illegal, nonconforming and conforming signs along federal-aid controlled highways and scenic byways.

===== Amendment 1408 =====
- Prohibited new billboards in unzoned commercial and industrial areas
- Allowed a locality to remove signs on federal-aid highways without payment of just compensation
- Placed a cap on the total number of signs
- Required an annual inventory
- Prohibited state vegetation control programs

===== Amendment 1404 =====
Prohibited new billboards in unzoned commercial and industrial areas

===== Amendment 1409 =====
- Allowed a locality to remove signs on federal-aid highways without just compensation
- Required an annual inventory
- Prohibited state vegetation control programs

===== TEA 21-1998 =====
No amendments to the outdoor advertisement control program were offered during debate on the Transportation Equity Act for the 21st (TEA 21), a six-year reauthorization of the highway, safety and transit program.

Billboard control remains an eligible item under the Transportation Enhancements Program as established under ISTEA of 1991 and continued by TEA 21 in 1998. The federal share is 80 percent.

== Recent activity ==
On August 10, 2005, President George W. Bush signed SAFE-TEA-LU (Safe, Accountable, Flexible, Efficient Transportation Equity Act): A Legacy for Users at a ceremony in Illinois; it was scheduled to expire on September 30, 2009. No amendments to the outdoor advertising control program were offered. This legislation lifted the cap on calculating transit advertising and concession revenue as "local match" funds to qualify for federal funding.

In 2008, Congress approved a technical corrections bill to fix errors in the Highway Bill signed in 2005. Conferees on the corrections bill considered but dropped a non-industry proposal to allow corporate floral logos in the right of way.

In 2006 and 2007, Congress considered amendments on appropriations bills to affirm state authority to allow rebuilding of damaged billboards after Hurricane Katrina. In 2006, a House-Senate conference on an Energy and Water Development appropriations bill deleted a storm-damage amendment. In 2007, a similar measure was stripped from an emergency appropriations bill on the Senate floor under a point of order.

In early 2006, FHWA announced a formal "conflict assessment" process on the Highway Beautification Act of 1965. A contract was signed with the U.S. Institute for Environmental Conflict Resolution (ECR), Tucson, AZ, to conduct a nationwide assessment in order for the agency to better understand the nature and complexity of the conflicts that have developed in the wake of the HBA and to determine what paths toward resolution are available.

Seven cities were selected as hosts for stakeholder interviews, focus groups and mini-public "drop-in" meetings. These cities were Sacramento, California: Cleveland, Ohio; Austin, Texas: Atlanta, Georgia; Salt Lake City, Utah; Kansas City, Missouri; and Philadelphia, Pennsylvania. The meetings were scheduled from mid-August to mid-November, 2006.

Through over 100 personal interviews, seven focus groups and public meetings in the seven cities along with over 1,800 comments to the Federal Register, the Assessors gathered unique perspectives about the outdoor advertising control program. The Assessors reached several fundamental conclusions: Conflict about outdoor advertising controls is substantive, organizational and attitudinal. Key issues perceived as both important to the stakeholders and having reasonable potential for agreement were:

- The use of new technology
- Abuses of signage in commercial and industrial areas
- Future of nonconforming signs
- Control of vegetation in the right of way around billboards
- Inconsistent regulation and enforcement
- FHWA's outdoor advertising control organization warrants attention – and changes, if any, should be addressed through a forum that includes state regulators
- A well-structured collaborative process holds promise to address substantive issues. However conditions for policy dialogue must be supported by FHWA leadership and endorsement along with good faith participation by stakeholders. The Assessors recommended selecting a limited number of issues to work on and organize a time period to resolve such issues.
- The final assessment report was published in the Federal Register in February, 2007.
- One of the first outcomes from the assessment was a policy memorandum released by FHWA about new technology. On September 25, 2007, the agency issued a policy memorandum titled: "Information: Guidance on Off-Premises Changeable Message Signs." This memorandum provided clarification to an earlier 1996 FHWA memorandum concerning changeable message signs and set policy guidance and standards for states to allow off-premises changeable message signs (i.e., digital billboards).

== Criticisms ==
=== Bypassed and decommissioned highways ===
The 1965 Highway Beautification Act coincided with an era in which key US Highways were being bypassed by new Interstate highways at a rapid pace. The first portion of U.S. Route 66 in California was removed from the US highway system in 1964 as the first step toward turning the entire length of U.S. Route 66 into decommissioned highway by 1985. A similar situation existed on countless other US Highways through small towns in which roadside businesses, formerly located directly on the main road and with unrestricted ability to rent space for signage from any landowner on the route, would soon find that not only had traffic been bypassed away from them by limited access freeways (often running approximately in parallel to the old road with no offramp to exit from one road to the other), but that federally imposed highway beautification initiatives prohibited them from placing any new signs on the new freeway to attempt to regain their former clientele.

This placed established independent business (typically on US Highways and small-town mainstreets) at a disadvantage to national chains increasingly entering the market by building new locations at the newly constructed freeway off-ramps. States were forced to follow the federal highway beautification agenda or risk losing federal highway funds. In many cases, the removal of signage would be simply one last contributing factor in putting established independent businesses on newly bypassed US Highways out of business.

=== Commercial/industrial regulations ===
The HBA allows billboards to be erected in any commercial or industrial area adjacent to interstate and federal-aid primary highways, with strict guidelines as to what constitutes commercial/industrial activity.

== See also ==
- Induced demand
