= Lookout Mountain Fairyland Club =

Historic building in the US state of Georgia

- U.S. National Register of Historic Places
- U.S. Historic district
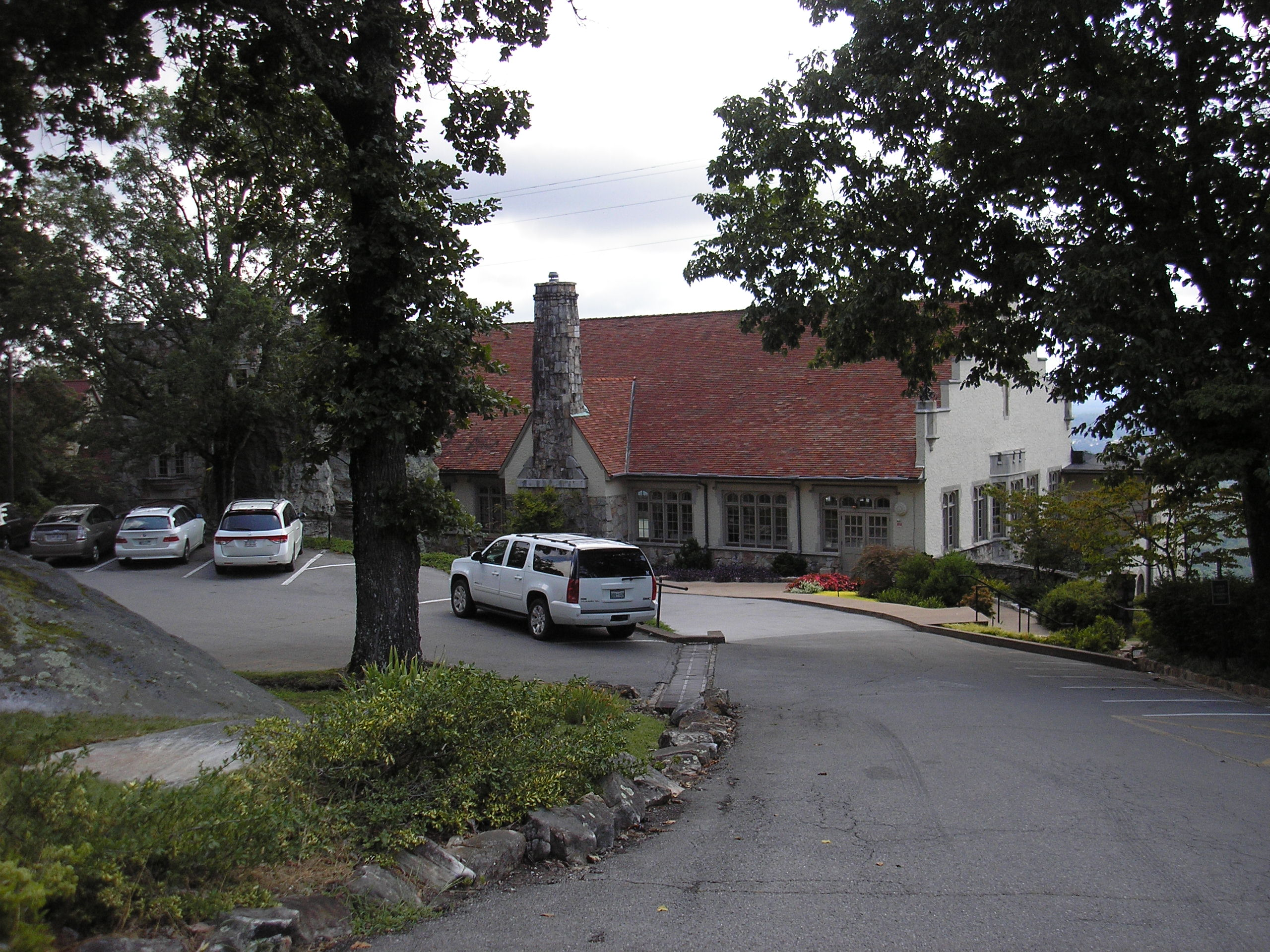

- Location within Georgia
- Location: 1201 Fleetwood Dr., Lookout Mountain, Georgia
- Coordinates: 34°58′31″N 85°20′55″W
- Area: 9.2 acres (3.7 ha)
- Built: 1928
- Architect: William Hatfield Sears, Warren Henry Manning
- Architectural style: Tudor Revival
- NRHP reference No.: 90000991
- Added to NRHP: June 21, 1990

The Lookout Mountain Fairyland Club on Lookout Mountain in Georgia, is listed on the National Register of Historic Places. It was designed by Chattanooga architect William Hatfield Sears. Grounds were enhanced by landscape architect Warren Henry Manning.

The listing included 11 contributing buildings: a main clubhouse and ten cottages. The clubhouse has a tower and crenelations and 65 rooms. The cottages were each two-story and had six or more rooms.

Its grounds had the world's second miniature golf course. This is associated with Rock City attraction, also listed on the National Register.
