= Garnet Carter =

American inventor and entrepreneur

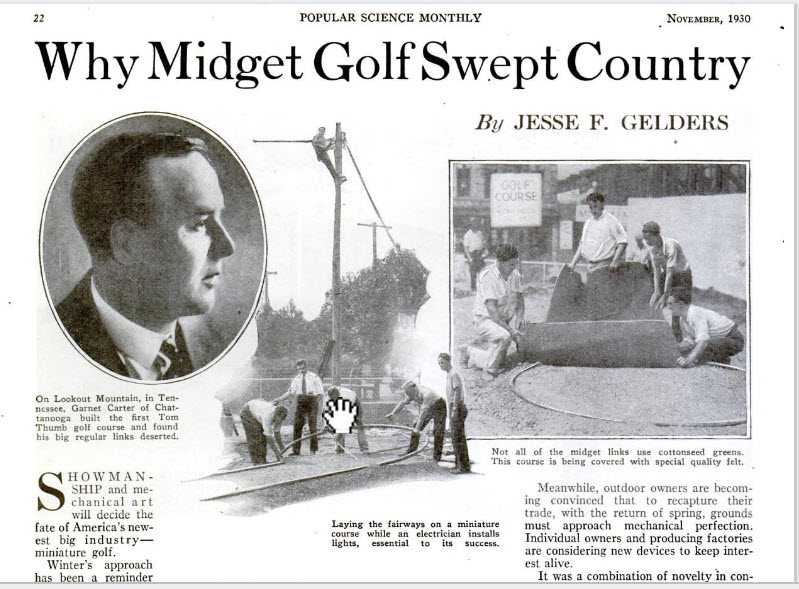
Write-up about the game and the inventor in Popular Science, November 1930

John Garnet Carter (Feb. 9, 1883, in Sweetwater, Tennessee – July 21, 1954) was an American inventor and entrepreneur who is considered one of the fathers of miniature golf. In 1927, Carter was the first to patent a version of the game which he called "Tom Thumb Golf". His course was built on Lookout Mountain in Georgia where Carter owned a hotel. Within a few years, thousands of Tom Thumb courses opened all over the United States. Carter eventually sold the rights to his patent and used his fortune to found the Rock City Gardens.
