= Rock City (attraction) =

Tourist attraction in Lookout Mountain, Georgia

Coordinates: 34°58′26″N 85°20′55″W

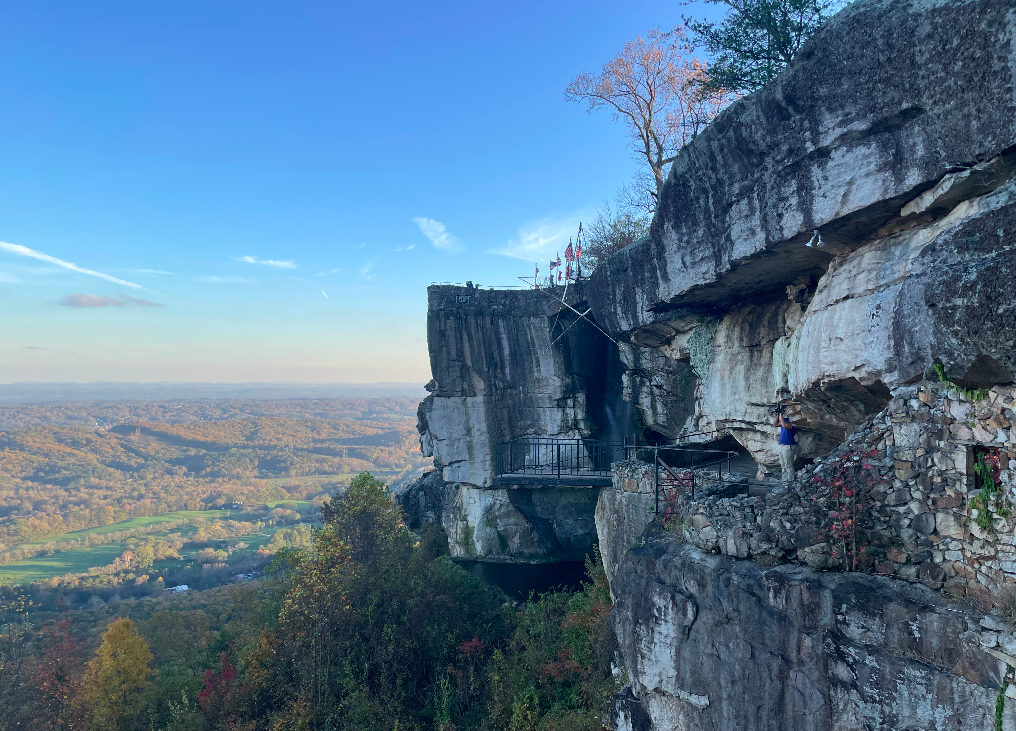
View of Lover's Leap at Rock City from the Observation Deck

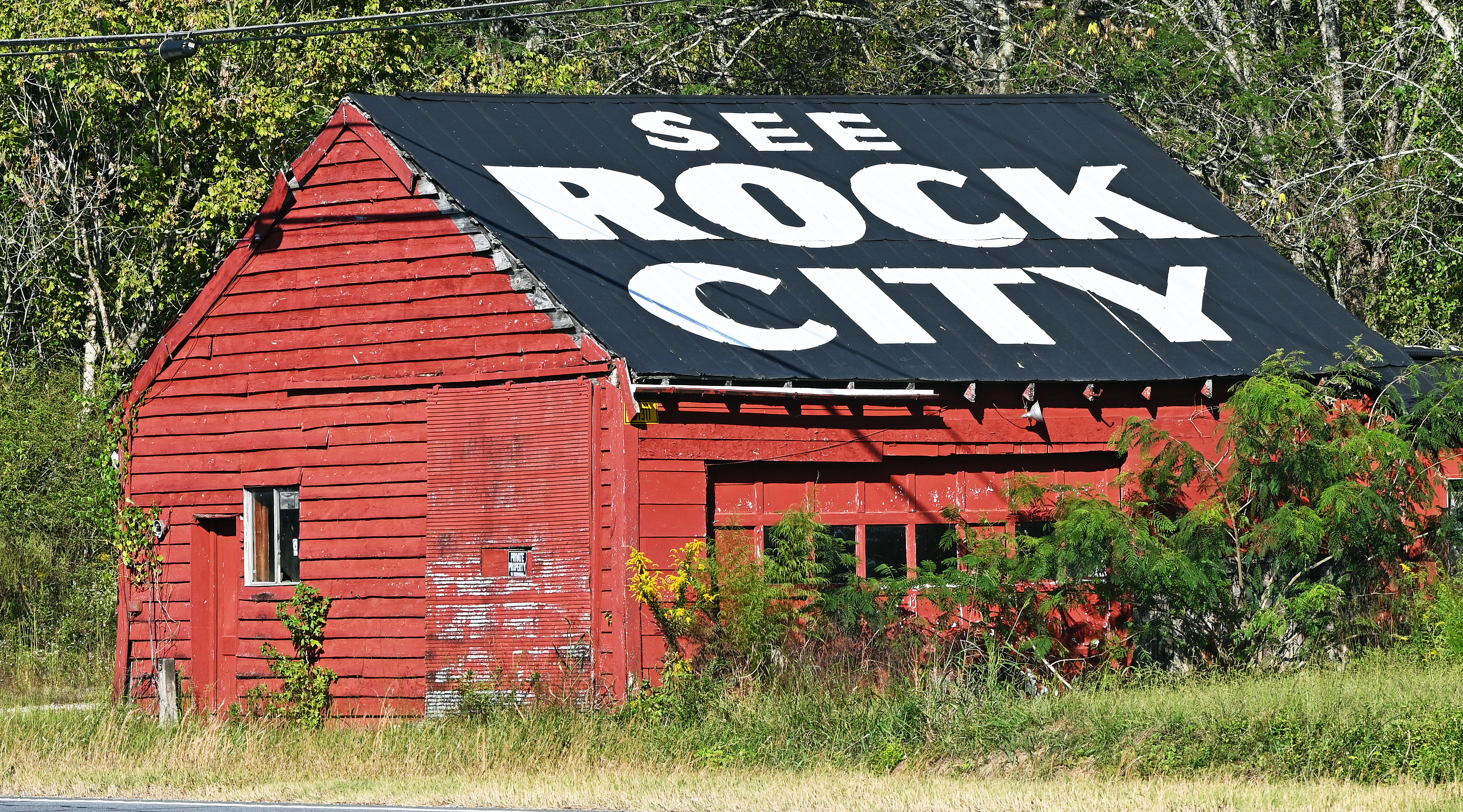
A barn advertisement on U.S. Route 27 in Georgia

Rock City is a tourist attraction on Lookout Mountain in Lookout Mountain, Georgia. Opened in May 1932, the attraction gained prominence after owners Garnet and Frieda Carter hired Clark Byers in 1935 to paint "See Rock City" barn advertisements throughout the Southeast and Midwest United States; Byers painted over 900 barn roofs and walls, in 19 states, by 1969.

Since its earliest days, Rock City has claimed that it is possible to see seven states from a particular spot (Lover's Leap) in Rock City; a scientist at the University of Tennessee, when asked to prove the issue in 2007, pointed out that the claim refers to seeing mountains and other high points in many of these other states, adding that the claim was made long before the air pollution associated with the proliferation of automobiles and coal-fired power plants, and summed up with "I never thought it significant."

== History ==
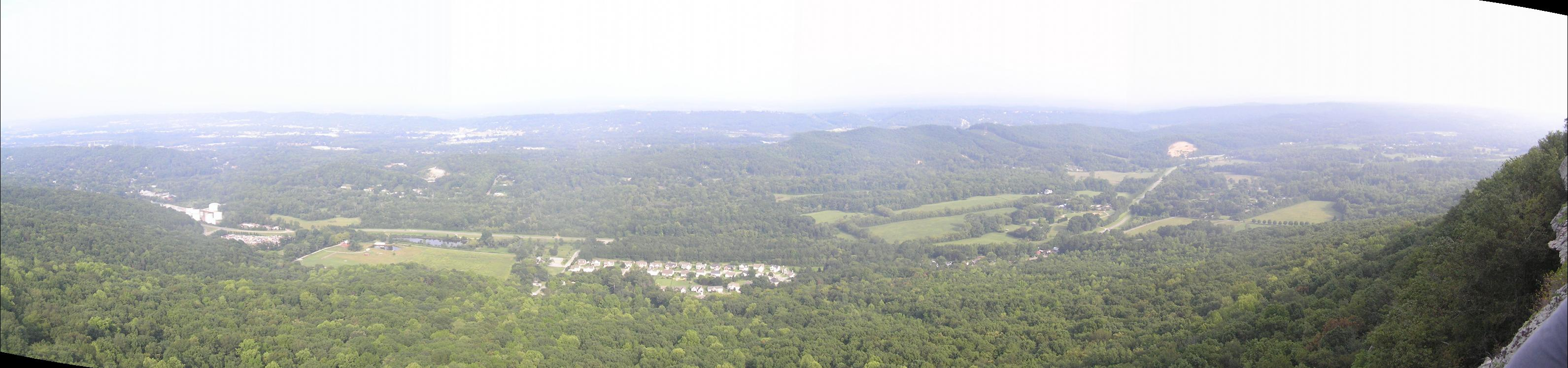
Panorama view from Lover's Leap

Historical evidence indicates that Native Americans inhabited Lookout Mountain at some point. In 1823, two missionaries, Daniel S. Butrick and William Chamberlain, went to minister to them. Butrick made a journal entry on August 28, 1823, in which he described "a citadel of rocks" on top of the mountain, and noted the immense size of the boulders. He stated that they were arranged in a way "as to afford streets and lanes".

By the time the American Civil War reached the slopes of Lookout Mountain, more people had discovered what was already being called Rock City. During the Battle of Lookout Mountain, both a Union soldier and a Confederate soldier claimed that seven states could be seen from the summit of the mountain. These stories are independent and recorded in their own journals.

Hikers and geologists knew Rock City well throughout the late 19th century, but it did not become the attraction it is now until the 20th century. Garnet Carter's idea was to develop a residential neighborhood on top of the mountain. The neighborhood was to be named Fairyland because of his wife Frieda's interest in European folklore. One feature of Fairyland was going to be a golf course, but Garnet decided instead to build a miniature golf course because the original took too long to build. He later franchised his miniature golf concept as Tom Thumb Golf, now recognized as the nation's first mini-golf course.

Fairyland was 700 acres (2.8 km^{2}) and encompassed Rock City. Frieda set out to develop the property into one big rock garden, taking string and marking a trail that wound its way around the giant rock formations, ending up at Lover's Leap. She also planted wildflowers and other plants along her trails and imported German gnome statues and other famous fairytale characters, set up at spots throughout the trail. Garnet realized that Frieda had made an attraction that people would be willing to pay for to see. Garnet and Frieda made Rock City a public attraction in 1932.

The original clubhouse and 10 cottages are included in the Lookout Mountain Fairyland Club.

== Events and shows ==
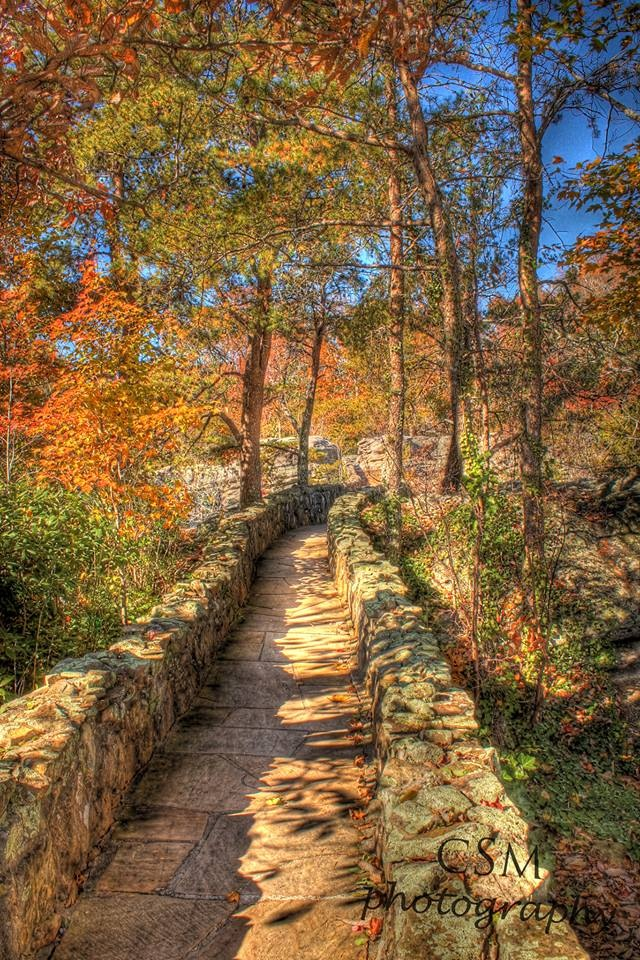
A bridge located inside of Rock City

In 2006, Rock City began having daily bird shows for its visitors. The bird shows focus on birds of prey. The shows are included with paid admission to the gardens. Now, however, the birds of prey shows are only hosted Thursdays through Sundays, from Memorial Day to Labor Day, at 11am, 1pm, and 3pm, with an additional show at 4:30 pm on Saturdays.

During March they host Shamrock City, turning the attraction into an Irish festival. The event includes Irish music, food, and games. They turn the falls green to celebrate St. Patrick's day.

In May, they host their Southern Blooms festival featuring the blooms of the native plants around the Garden. They also celebrate their Founder's Day; which in 2022, they celebrate their 90th Anniversary.

During the summer, they host Summer Music Weekends to celebrate summer with tunes from local bands.

Every October, Rock City host Rocktoberfest as their premiere fall event featuring German food, music and fun for the whole family.

Rock City lights the park with Christmas lights and displays every November and December. This is named "Enchanted Garden of Lights" and features booths of food and gifts, as well as seasonal shows such as a lighted telling of the Nativity of Jesus and carolers from all over the region.

== Attractions ==
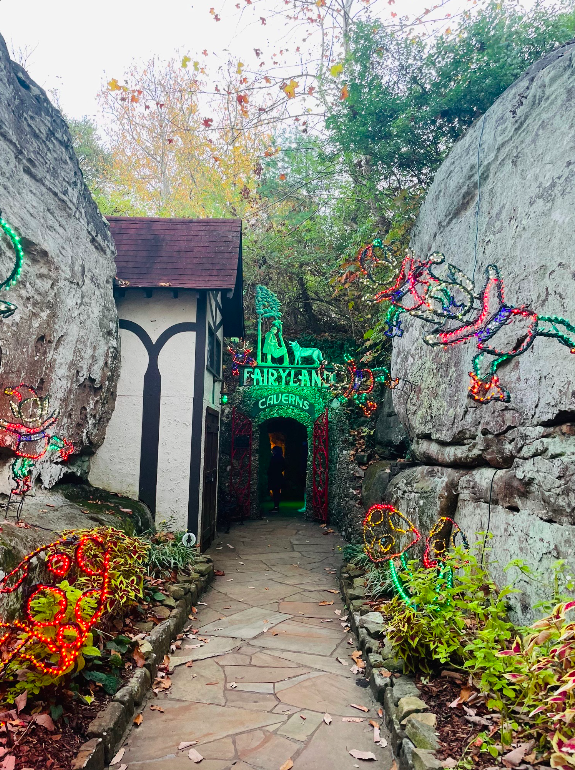
The entrance to the Fairyland Caverns at Rock City

Rock City features a 4100-foot walking trail lined with gardens containing hundreds of labelled local trees and plants. The trail also leads through a variety of rock formations, including the 1,000 short tons (910 t) Balanced Rock and Fat Man's Squeeze. Two other sections, the Fairyland Caverns and Mother Goose Village, are rock caves decorated with blacklight-responsive sculptures. Other attractions include Standing Stone Gardens, Rainbow Hall, Swing-a-long Bridge, Stone Bridge, Cave of the Winds, Sky Bridge, Needle's Eye, and Goblin's Underpass.

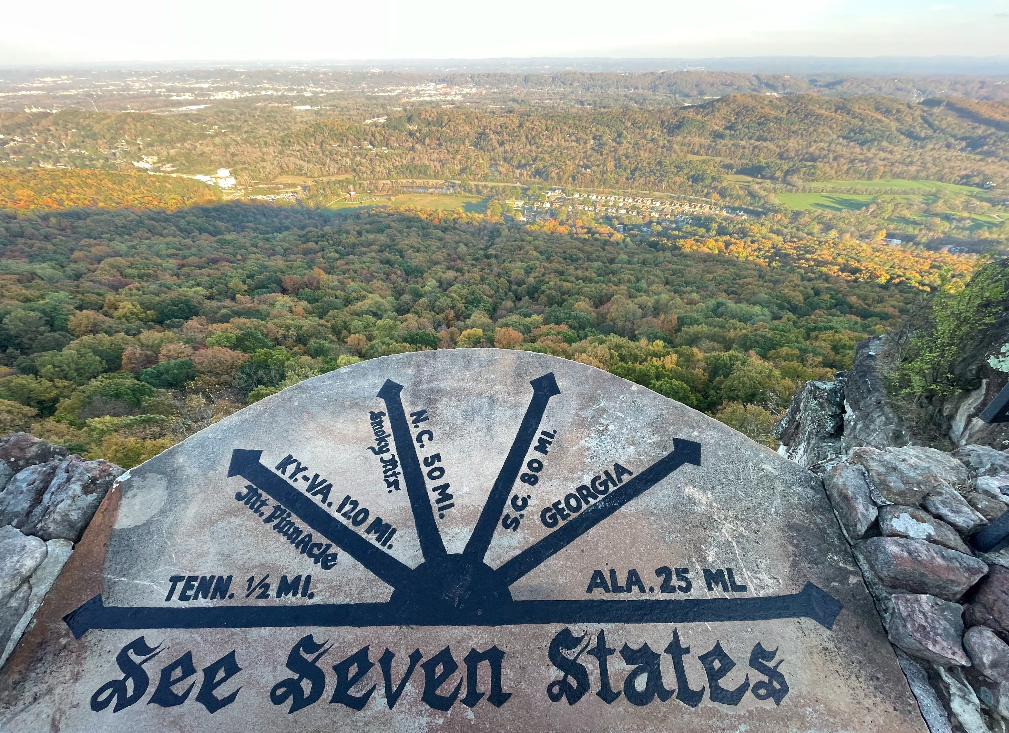
The "See Seven States" plaque atop Lover's Leap

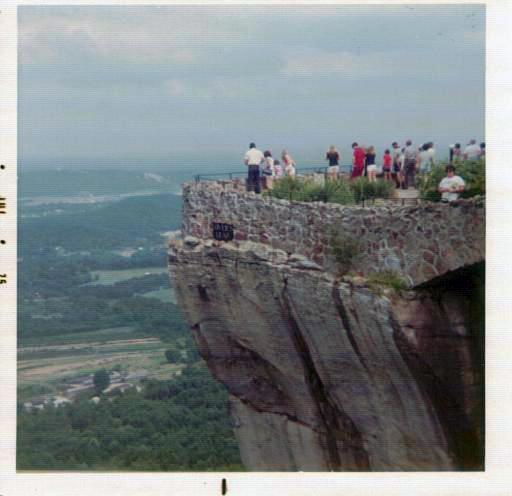
Tourists stand atop Rock City, July 1975

The High Falls of the Lookout Mountain is a manmade waterfall in the Rock City Gardens. The waterfall is 140 feet (43 m) high and empties into a base which appears as a small pool.

== In popular culture ==
Rock City features prominently in the Drama Desk Award-winning musical See Rock City & Other Destinations, with book and lyrics by Adam Mathias, and music by Brad Alexander. The musical, which premiered Off-Broadway on July 22, 2010, consists of a series of vignettes at a variety of North American tourist destinations, including Rock City. Rock City also features prominently in Neil Gaiman's novel American Gods.
