= Lookout Mountain =

Mountain in Alabama, Georgia, and Tennessee, United States

Lookout Mountain – High Point
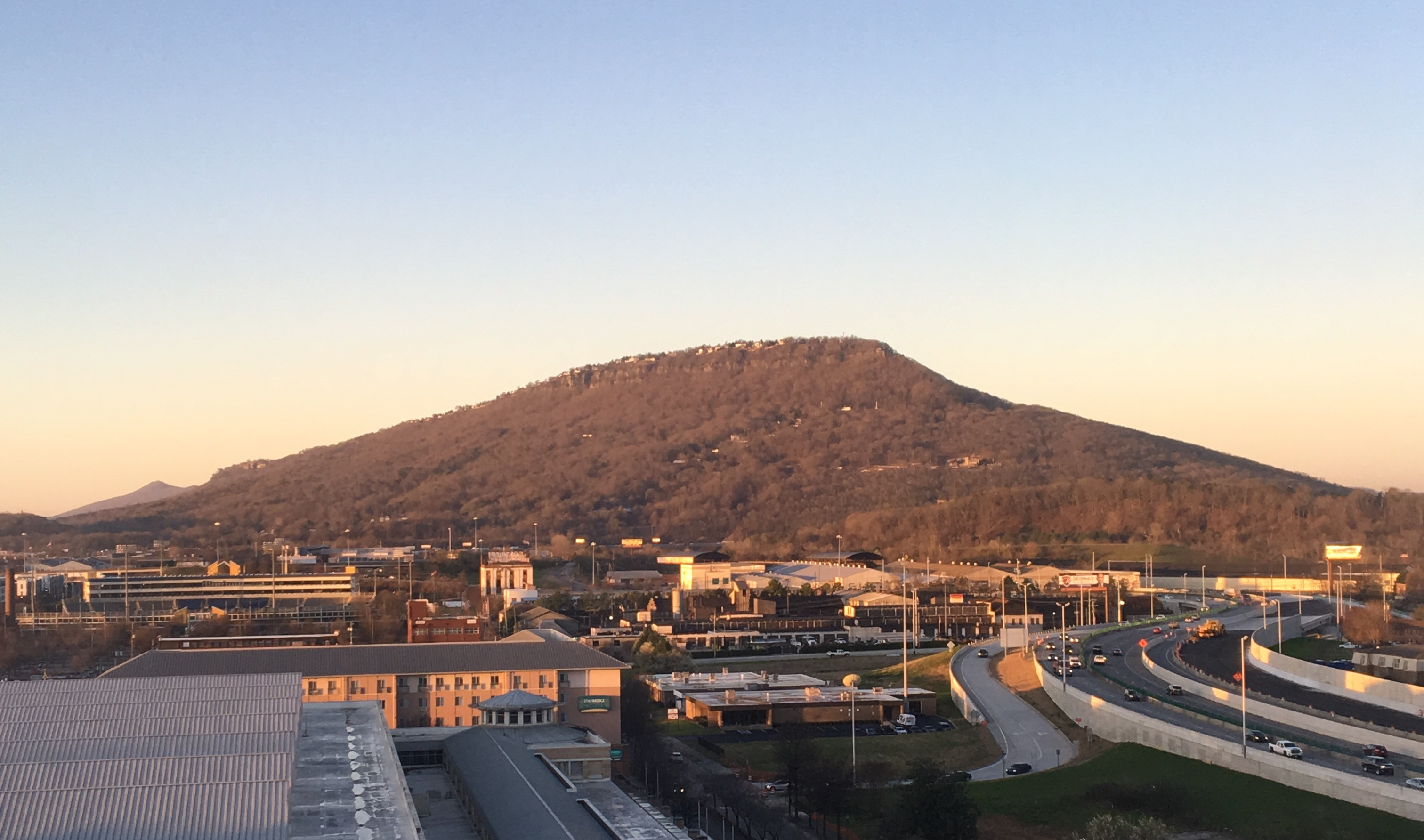
- Lookout Mountain as viewed from downtown Chattanooga

Highest point
- Elevation: 2,389 ft (728 m) NAVD 88
- Prominence: 1,532 ft (467 m)
- Listing: Highest point in Walker County
- Coordinates: 34°51′49″N 85°23′33″W

Geography
- Location within Georgia Location within the United States
- Location: Walker County, Georgia, US
- Parent range: Cumberland Plateau
- Topo map: USGS Durham

Lookout Mountain is a mountain ridge at the northwest corner of the U.S. state of Georgia, the northeast corner of Alabama, and along the southeastern Tennessee state line in Chattanooga. Lookout Mountain was the scene of the 18th-century "Last Battle of the Cherokees" in this area during the Nickajack Expedition. On November 24, 1863, during the American Civil War, the Battle of Lookout Mountain took place here.

== Name ==
The name appears on maps as early as the Mathew Carey "Map of The Tennessee Government" (1795).

== Geography ==
=== Northern and eastern slopes and summit ===
Lookout Mountain and Sand Mountain (to the southwest) make up a large portion of the southernmost end of the Cumberland Plateau. The area was lifted from an ancient sea, and worn down by erosion for millions of years. The summit, called "High Point", is just east of Thompsonville in Walker County, Georgia, with an elevation of 2,392 feet (729 m) above sea level. The foothills of the mountain extend into Chickamauga and Chattanooga National Military Park.

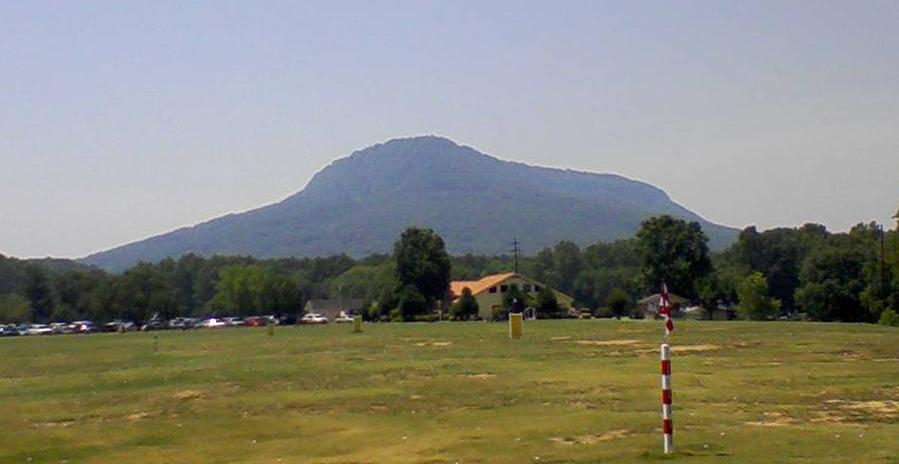
A view of the apex of Lookout Mountain

The caves of Ruby Falls are in Lookout Mountain, and the rock formations of the "City of Rocks" (or Rock City) attraction are situated on the ridge. The area is home to the Lookout Mountain Incline Railway, Covenant College, and a hang-gliding school. Lookout Mountain is one of Chattanooga's most visited tourist attractions.

Civil War-related landmarks include "Point Park", operated by the National Park Service, and the Cravens House. Nearby are Georgia's Cloudland Canyon and Cloudland Canyon State Park.

=== Southern and western slopes ===
The southwestern section of Lookout Mountain is in northeastern Alabama. The Little River flows over the mountain in Little River Canyon National Preserve and the DeSoto Falls in DeSoto State Park.

The Noccalula Falls Park, featuring a pioneer village showcasing several 19th-century homes, is at the southern terminus of Lookout Mountain, in Gadsden, Alabama. Local legend claims that Noccalula, the namesake of the 90-foot (27 m) falls, jumped to her death because she could not marry the man she loved.

White water sports and rock-climbing (offering views of the Coosa River Basin) are this area's key attractions.

=== Seven states ===
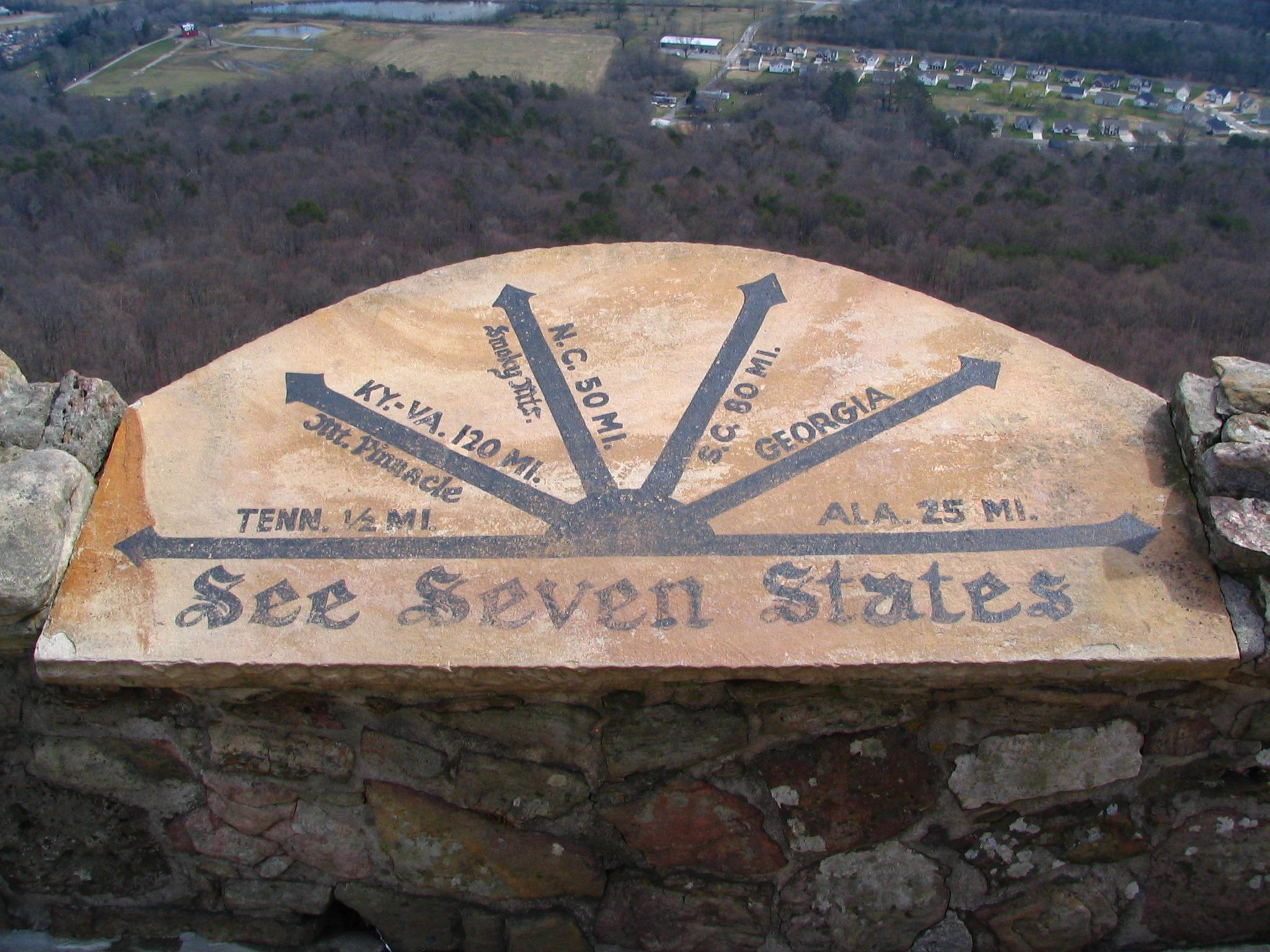
The marker at the summit of Lookout Mountain claims seven states may be viewed from the site

From the "Rock City" point, a marker claims that seven U.S. states can be seen: Tennessee, Kentucky, Virginia, South Carolina, North Carolina, Georgia, and Alabama. The claim is repeated on numerous barn roofs in the surrounding area. No scientific investigation has upheld this claim.

=== Sunset Rock ===
On the northwest side of Lookout Mountain, Sunset Rock is a popular trailhead and tourist stop. It is part of the Chickamauga and Chattanooga Military State Park, the largest and oldest Civil War national park.

Once known as Point Lookout, Sunset Rock provides a view of the Tennessee River, Signal Mountain and Prentice Cooper State Forest.

A 100-foot (30 m) cliff and moderate temperatures invite heavy traffic for its many climbing routes, which were completed in 1960. Sunset Rock is mainly sandstone, making for easier routing and climbing. Route development continued through the 1960s and 1970s. In the 1980s, routers pushed the grades ever higher. Climbing here is especially popular in the autumn months due to cooler weather.

==== Civil War history ====
Sunset Rock is attractive to Civil War enthusiasts due to its history; it has a Tennessee Historical Commission Marker at the head of the trail, describing its Civil War battle history.

In 1863, Confederate Generals Braxton Bragg and James Longstreet used Sunset Rock as a lookout, where they were able to track the movement of the Union troops as they entered Lookout Valley. It is claimed that, unknown to Longstreet, the Union troops could see him on Sunset Rock from the valley, where they were able to decipher the Confederate code, giving them the ability to anticipate the next moves of the Confederates.

During the subsequent Battle of Wauhatchie, the Confederate army attempted to remove the Union forces from the river and block their supply lines. This attempt was unsuccessful, however, and the Union forces were able to lift the siege of Chattanooga.

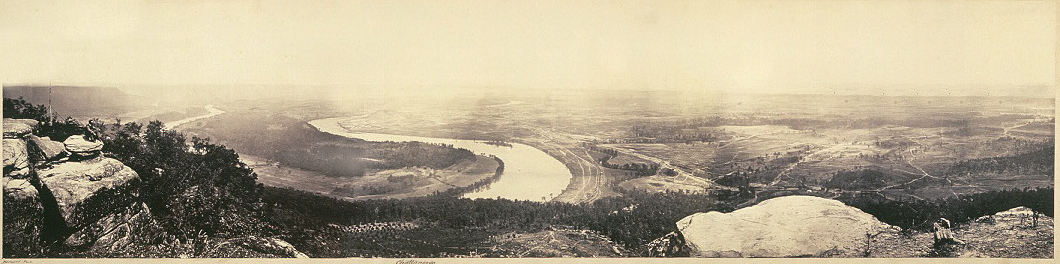
A panoramic view from the top of Lookout Mountain, overlooking Chattanooga, an albumen print by George N. Barnard dated February 1864

== History ==
=== Native Americans and Lookout Mountain ===
The Chickamauga people, a branch of Cherokee Native Americans, lived in the Chattanooga area. The Chickamauga called the mountain Chat-a-nu-ga; hence the name of the city. Research suggests the mountain was inhabited, although no physical evidence has been found. On top of the mountain, the pattern of boulders suggest lanes or walls were once there.

=== Revolutionary War and aftermath ===
During the Revolutionary War, a battle between forces of John Sevier's Washington District Regiment and those of Chief Dragging Canoe of the Chickamauga Cherokee, may have taken place on Lookout Mountain on September 20, 1782. Archaeologist and ethno-historian, Raymond Evans, has asserted that such a battle could not have taken place. However, a battle between militia forces under Joseph Martin, at the time Superintendent for Indian Affairs for both Virginia and North Carolina, and those of Dragging Canoe did occur there in August 1788.

=== Settlements ===
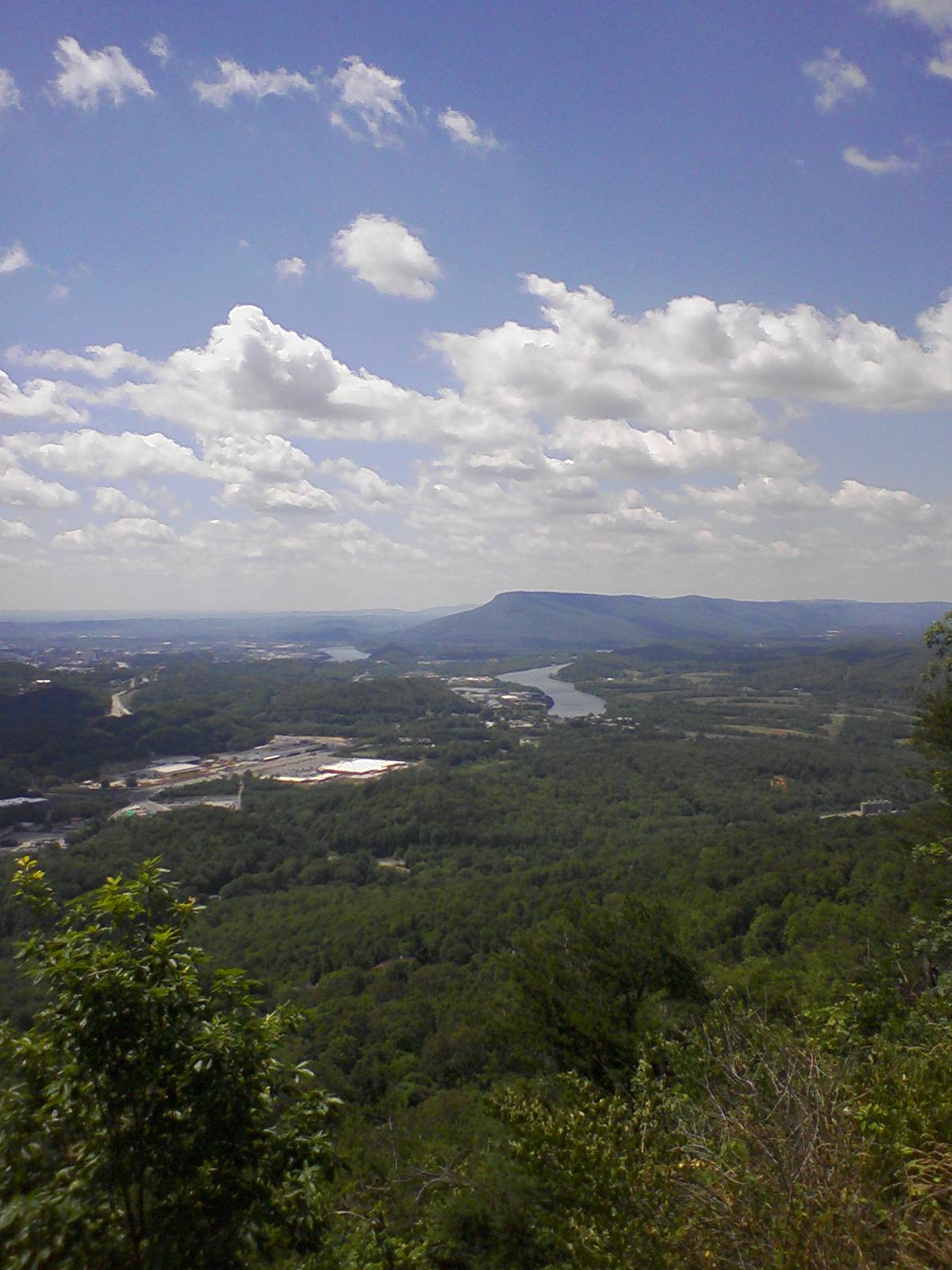
Lookout Mountain, as viewed from Signal Mountain, Tennessee

It was reported that on August 28, 1823, Daniel S. Butrick and William Chamberlain arrived at Lookout Mountain to perform missionary work with Native Americans. After the Trail of Tears, land purchased from the tribes by the US government was then sold to private individuals at auction.

The aptly named Summertown, on top of the mountain, was barely accessible from a small rutted turnpike which had been built in 1852 by Colonel James A. Whiteside. Whiteside, a native of Danville, Kentucky, owned a summer home which he converted into a hotel with several cottages. Naturalists who came to the area and visited the summit, such as Bradford Torrey, thought the cottages spoiled the environment and made it look like a cheap resort. Whiteside had purchased much of the land on the mountain's summit. Another wealthy Chattanoogan, Robert Cravens, had purchased most of the land on the side of the mountain. Cravens was also instrumental in developing the area, and moved into the house he built (the Cravens House) in 1855. Within a few years, about 25 families regularly summered on the mountain.

Lookout Mountain's Sunset Rock was once the home to the photo shop of JB Linn. After the Union forces under Major General Joseph Hooker took over the mountain, Linn gained access to Sunset Rock (then called Point Lookout). He built a small shack there and named it "Gallery Point Lookout". In December 1863, he and his brother began taking photographs of many war commanders and officers, as well as wealthy civilians in the area. They became very successful with these pictures. The Gallery Point Lookout House is no longer in existence, but many of Linn's photographs still exist.

=== Civil War ===
On November 24, 1863, the Battle of Lookout Mountain was fought on the slopes of the mountain. The majority of hand-to-hand combat took place near Cravens' house (about halfway to the summit). Lookout Mountain's shape and location can in some conditions cause a unique weather phenomenon in the area: after dawn, fog will sometimes descend from the cooler mountaintop and stop about halfway down. Such an event took place the day of the battle and is the reason for its romanticized name, the "Battle Above the Clouds". The battle was won by Union forces, enabling them to lift the Confederate siege of Chattanooga.

=== After the Civil War ===
==== Yellow fever epidemic ====
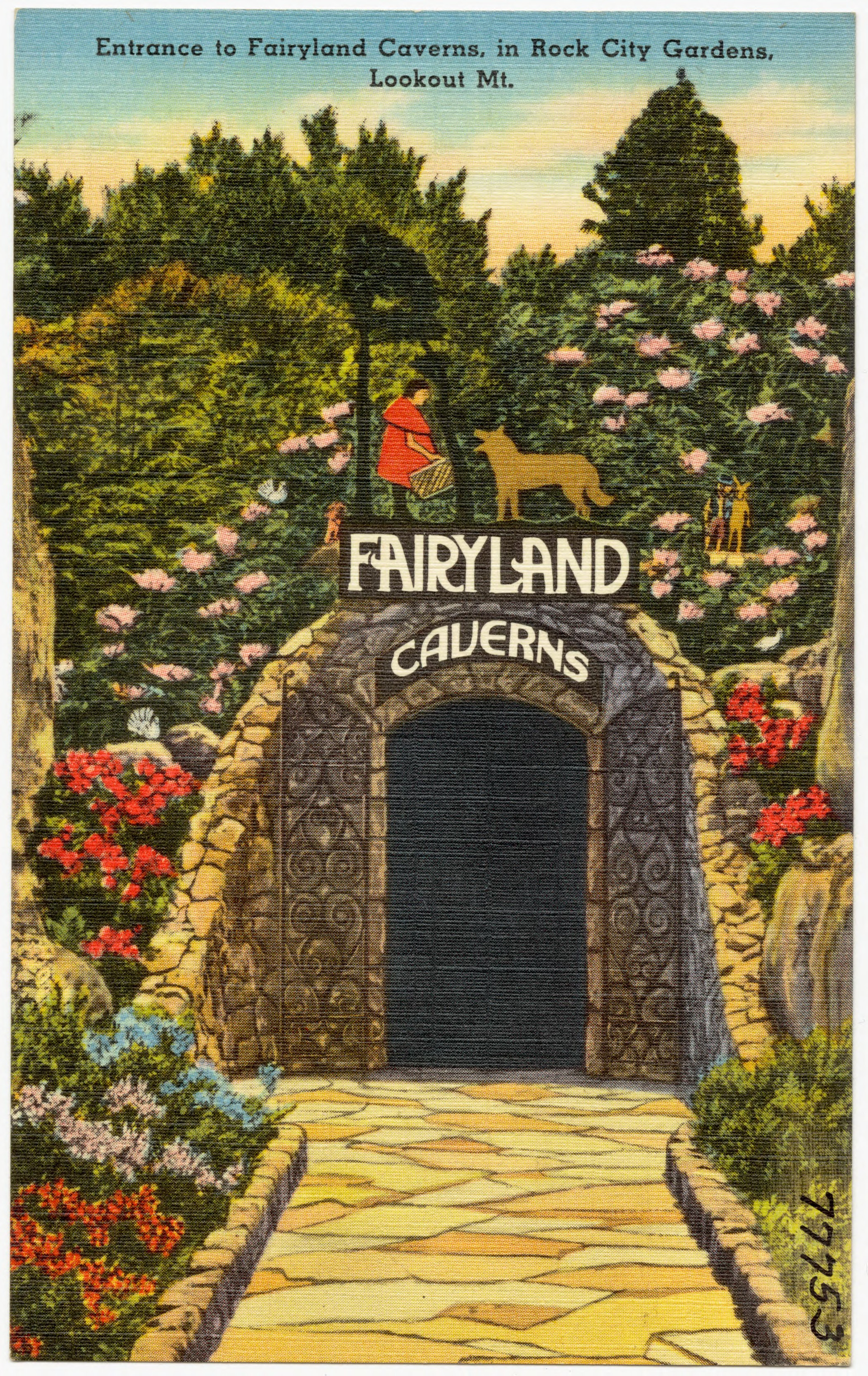
1940s postcard for Fairyland Caverns, a cave which displays fairy-tale creatures and a castle

When cases of Yellow fever began to increase in the United States, the Chattanooga population believed that the city was immune to any possibility of an epidemic because of its mountain climate. In 1878, two local residents died of the disease, throwing the city into a panic that led some 12,000 people to flee. Many of these went up the mountain, believing the climate would offer some protection against the disease. After the epidemic passed, many people complained about the inconvenient and complicated travel up the mountain, and the St. Elmo Turnpike (Ochs Highway) was created to help with access to the mountain. Early in the 1900s, Lookout Mountain was incorporated as a town.

==== Twentieth-century tourist boom ====
During the 20th century, some wealthy businessmen settled permanently on the mountain, while its attraction as a tourist destination also grew.

In the 1910s and 1920s, a number of entrepreneurs, including Garnet Carter, J.B. Pound, O.B. Andrews, and Leo Lambert, began developing, improving, and marketing attractions.

Today, tourist attractions include:

- Battle of Lookout Mountain Museum: soldier figurines and topographical maps.
- Lookout Mountain Incline Railway: a National Historic site, the railroad has an incline of 72.7%.
- Rock City: trails laid of rock with various attractions, including Lover's Leap, Balanced Rock, and Fat Man's Squeeze.
- Ruby Falls: a cave with a 145-foot (44 m) waterfall deep inside the mountain.
