= List of Presbyterian Church in America–related articles =

List

This is a list of articles related to the Presbyterian Church in America (PCA).

== Agencies and committees ==
- Covenant College
- Covenant Theological Seminary
- Mission to the World
- Reformed University Fellowship

== Churches ==
- Briarwood Presbyterian Church (Birmingham, Alabama)
- Christ the King Presbyterian Church (Cambridge, Massachusetts)
- College Hill Presbyterian Church (Oxford, Mississippi)
- Coral Ridge Presbyterian Church (Fort Lauderdale, Florida)
- Fairfield Presbyterian Church
- First Presbyterian Church (Chattanooga, Tennessee)
- Hickory Withe Presbyterian Church (Hickory Withe, Tennessee)
- Korean Central Presbyterian Church (Centreville, Virginia)
- New Hope Christian Church (Monsey, New York)
- Redeemer Presbyterian Church (New York, New York)
- Tenth Presbyterian Church (Philadelphia, Pennsylvania)
- Third Presbyterian Church (Birmingham, Alabama)
- Sarang Community Church of Southern California

== People ==
- Joel Belz
- Marsha Blackburn
- Anthony Bradley
- Steve Brown, author
- Bryan Chapell
- Edmund Clowney
- Gary DeMar
- Ligon Duncan
- Dave Ferriss
- John Gerstner
- George Grant, author
- R. Laird Harris
- Timothy J. Keller
- D. James Kennedy
- George W. Knight III
- Paul Kooistra
- Francis Nigel Lee
- Peter Leithart
- Richard Lints
- Rich Lusk
- Allan MacRae
- Raymond C. Ortlund, Jr.
- Vern Poythress
- Francis Schaeffer
- R. C. Sproul
- Jim Talent
- Tullian Tchividjian
- Kathy Tyers
- J. Steven Wilkins
