= Rayburn (name) =

Rayburn is both a surname and a masculine given name. Notable people with the name include:

== People ==
=== Surname ===
- Gene Rayburn (1917–1999), American television and radio personality
- Gregory F. Rayburn (born 1958), American businessman
- Jim Rayburn (1909–1970), American Presbyterian minister
- Joel Rayburn (born 1969), American diplomat, author, and soldier
- Margaret Rayburn (1927–2013), American educator and politician
- Margie Rayburn (1924–2000), American singer
- Ray Rayburn (1948–2021), American audio and electrical engineer, author, and standards analyst
- Robert G. Rayburn (1915–1990), American pastor and college president; father of Bentley and Robert S. Rayburn
- Robert S. Rayburn (born 1950), American pastor and theologian; son of Robert G. Rayburn; brother of Bentley Rayburn
- Sam Rayburn (1882–1961), American politician
- Sam Rayburn (American football) (born 1980), American football player
- Sixty Rayburn (1916–2008), American politician
- Virgil Rayburn (1910–1991), American football player
- Wendell G. Rayburn (1929–2016), American educator and college president

=== Given name ===
- Rayburn Doucett (born 1943), Canadian politician
- Rayburn Wright (1922–1990), American musician

=== Fictional characters ===
- The Rayburn family on the Netflix series Bloodline
