= Robert Rayburn =

Robert Rayburn may refer to:

- Robert G. Rayburn, American pastor and college president
- Robert S. Rayburn, his son, American pastor and theologian
