= ICPF =

ICPF may refer to:

- Inter Collegiate Prayer Fellowship, a Christian campus group which is spread across 19 countries
- Institute of Chemical Process Fundamentals, one of the six institutes belonging to the ASCR chemical sciences section
- International Commission on Peace and Food, private non-governmental initiative to bring an end to the arms race
