= Lewis Bevens Schenck =

American theologian

Lewis Bevens Schenck (1898–1985) was an American theologian. He is best known for his 1940 work, The Presbyterian Doctrine of Children in the Covenant: An Historical Study of the Significance of Infant Baptism in the Presbyterian Church in America, in which he examined the doctrine of covenant succession. Robert S. Rayburn notes that Schenck "accounts for the modern eclipse of the Reformed doctrine of covenant succession by the dramatic impact of the Great Awakening and the resultant revivalism." However, according to Thomas Trouwborst, Schenck's book has led to a revival of the "historic Presbyterian and Reformed view concerning covenant children."

Schenck studied at Union Seminary and served for a time as a pastor. He then earned a ThM degree from Princeton Theological Seminary and a PhD from Yale University. The Presbyterian Doctrine of Children in the Covenant was a reworking of his doctoral dissertation. He became the J. W. Cannon Professor of Bible and Religion at Davidson College, where he taught from 1927 to 1966.
