= KCPC =

KCPC may refer to:

- KCPC (FM), a radio station (88.3 FM) licensed to serve Camino, California, United States
- Korean Central Presbyterian Church
