= Marion Barnes =

American educator (1913–2004)

Marion David Barnes (1913–2004) was President of Covenant College from 1965 to 1978. According to Rudy Schmidt, Barnes "paved the way for the college to move from its Midwestern roots to be a welcomed institution in the Southeast."

Barnes grew up in Union County, Arkansas, and studied at the University of Arkansas before teaching chemistry at City College of New York, Columbia University and Wheaton College. He then worked for Lion Oil, Monsanto, and The Sulphur Institute.

In 1949, Barnes became the founding editor of the A.S.A. Bulletin, now called Perspectives on Science and Christian Faith. He served as editor until 1951.

After retiring from Covenant, Barnes helped establish Daystar University in Kenya.

Academic offices
Preceded by Robert G. Rayburn	President of Covenant College; 1965–1978	Succeeded by Martin Essenburg
