= Gordon Clark =

American philosopher and theologian

- Born: Gordon Haddon Clark; August 31, 1902
- Died: April 9, 1985 (aged 82)

Philosophical work
- Era: 20th-century philosophy
- Region: Western philosophy
- School: Calvinism; Presuppositionalism; Christian philosophy
- Main interests: Epistemology; Philosophy of religion
- Notable ideas: Scripturalism

Gordon Haddon Clark (August 31, 1902 – April 9, 1985) was an American philosopher and Calvinist theologian. He was a leading figure associated with presuppositional apologetics, although not a presuppositonalist himself, and was chairman of the Philosophy Department at Butler University for 28 years. He was an expert in pre-Socratic and ancient philosophy and was noted for defending the idea of propositional revelation against empiricism and rationalism, in arguing that all truth is propositional. His theory of knowledge is sometimes called scripturalism.

== Biography ==
Clark was raised in a Christian home and studied Calvinist thought from a young age. In 1924, he graduated from the University of Pennsylvania with a bachelor's degree in French and earned his doctorate in Philosophy from the same institution in 1929. The following year he studied at the Sorbonne.

He began teaching at the University of Pennsylvania after receiving his bachelor's degree and also taught at the Reformed Episcopal Seminary in Philadelphia. In 1936, he accepted a professorship in Philosophy at Wheaton College, Illinois, where he remained until 1943 when he accepted the Chairmanship of the Philosophy Department at Butler University in Indianapolis. After his retirement from Butler in 1973, he taught at Covenant College in Lookout Mountain, Georgia, and Sangre de Cristo Seminary in Westcliffe, Colorado.

Clark's denominational affiliations would change many times. He was born into and eventually became a ruling elder in the Presbyterian Church in the United States of America. However, he would eventually leave with a small group of conservatives, led by John Gresham Machen, to help form the Presbyterian Church of America (renamed the Orthodox Presbyterian Church in 1938) and would be ordained in the OPC in 1944. However, in 1948, following the Clark-Van Til Controversy, he joined the United Presbyterian Church of North America. Following the UPCNA's 1956 merger with the Presbyterian Church in the United States of America (the same denomination from which the OPC had separated from in 1936) to form the United Presbyterian Church in the United States of America, Clark joined the Reformed Presbyterian Church, General Synod in 1957. Clark was instrumental in arranging a merger between the RPCGS and the Evangelical Presbyterian Church to form the Reformed Presbyterian Church, Evangelical Synod in 1965. When the RPCES became part of the Presbyterian Church in America in 1982, Clark refused to join the PCA and instead entered the unaffiliated Covenant Presbytery in 1984.

Clark was also elected president of the Evangelical Theological Society in 1965.

He died in 1985 and was buried near Westcliffe, Colorado.

== Philosophy ==
Clark's philosophy and theology has been summarized as:

- Epistemology: propositional revelation in the Bible
- Soteriology: faith alone
- Metaphysics: theism
- Ethics: the superiority of divine law over human law/Christian egoism
- Politics: constitutional republic

== Personal life ==
Clark met his future wife Ruth Schmidt during his graduate studies at the University of Pennsylvania; she had actually been baptized by Gordon's father as a baby. They married in 1929 and stayed together for 48 years until Ruth's death from leukemia in 1977. They had two daughters, Lois Antoinette (later Lois Zeller, b. 1936) and Nancy Elizabeth (later Betsy Clark George, b. 1941). At the time of his death, Clark was survived by his two daughters and their husbands, 12 grandchildren, and one great-grandchild.

Clark was well known as a keen chessplayer. In 1966, he won the championship of the King's Men Chess Club in Indianapolis.

== Publications ==
Clark was a prolific author who wrote more than forty books, including texts on ancient and contemporary philosophy, volumes on Christian doctrines, commentaries on the New Testament and a one-volume history of philosophy. Many of his works have been reprinted by the Trinity Foundation.

=== Philosophy ===
- An Introduction to Christian Philosophy (ISBN 0-940931-38-9), in which Clark's thought is well summarized in three lectures given at Wheaton College, reissued in Christian Philosophy (ISBN 1-891777-02-5)
- Three Types of Religious Philosophy, reissued in Christian Philosophy (ISBN 1-891777-02-5)
- Thales to Dewey, a history of philosophy (ISBN 1-891777-09-2)
- Ancient Philosophy, Dr. Clark's section of a History of Philosophy, which he co-published with three other authors; also includes eleven major essays, including his doctoral dissertation on Aristotle (ISBN 0-940931-49-4)
- William James and John Dewey (ISBN 0-940931-43-5)
- Behaviorism and Christianity (ISBN 0-940931-04-4)
- Philosophy of Science and Belief in God (ISBN 0-940931-85-0)
- Historiography: Secular and Religious (ISBN 0-940931-39-7)
- A Christian View of Men and Things, which develops Clark's Christian worldview (ISBN 1-891777-00-9)
- A Christian Philosophy of Education (ISBN 1-891777-06-8)
- Logic, a textbook on logic for students (ISBN 0-940931-71-0)
- Essays on Ethics and Politics (ISBN 0-940931-32-X)
- Lord God of Truth printed with Concerning the Teacher by St. Augustine (ISBN 0-940931-40-0)
- Selections from Hellenistic Philosophy edited by Clark (ISBN 0-89197-396-6)
- Readings in Ethics edited by Clark and T. V. Smith (ISBN 0-390-19545-6)
- Clark Speaks from the Grave written just before Clark died and published posthumously, responding to some of his critics (ISBN 0-940931-12-5)

=== Theology ===
- In Defense of Theology (ISBN 0-88062-123-0)
- Religion, Reason, and Revelation, Clark's major work on apologetics (ISBN 0-940931-86-9)
- God's Hammer: The Bible and Its Critics (ISBN 0-940931-88-5)
- What Do Presbyterians Believe?, a commentary on the Westminster Confession of Faith (ISBN 0-940931-60-5)
- Predestination, the combined edition of Biblical Predestination and Predestination in the Old Testament; a study of the idea of election in the Bible
- Karl Barth's Theological Method, a book critical of Barth (ISBN 0-940931-51-6)
- Language and Theology (ISBN 0-940931-90-7)
- The Johannine Logos, on John the Evangelist's use of the term Logos (ISBN 0-940931-22-2)
- Faith and Saving Faith (ISBN 0-940931-95-8); reissued as What is Saving Faith? (ISBN 0-940931-65-6)
- Today's Evangelism: Counterfeit or Genuine? (ISBN 0-940931-28-1)
- The Biblical Doctrine of Man (ISBN 0-940931-91-5)
- The Incarnation (ISBN 0-940931-23-0)
- The Holy Spirit (ISBN 0-940931-37-0)
- The Atonement (ISBN 0-940931-87-7)
- Sanctification (ISBN 0-940931-33-8)
- The Trinity (ISBN 0-940931-92-3)
- Logical Criticism of Textual Criticism

=== Commentaries ===
- First Corinthians: A Contemporary Commentary (ISBN 0-940931-29-X)
- Ephesians (ISBN 0-940931-11-7)
- Philippians (ISBN 0-940931-47-8)
- Colossians (ISBN 0-940931-25-7)
- First and Second Thessalonians (ISBN 0-940931-14-1)
- The Pastoral Epistles on the first and second letters to Timothy and Titus (ISBN 1-891777-04-1)
- New Heavens, New Earth on the first and second letters of Peter (ISBN 0-940931-36-2)
- First John (ISBN 0-940931-94-X)

Additionally, Ronald Nash edited a Festschrift The Philosophy of Gordon H. Clark (Philadelphia: Presbyterian and Reformed, 1968), which presented a summary of Clark's thought (viz., the Wheaton lectures mentioned above), critiques by several authors, and rejoinders by Clark.
