= Reformed Presbyterian Church, Evangelical Synod =

North American Christian denomination, 1965–1982

- Classification: Protestant
- Orientation: Calvinist
- Polity: Presbyterian polity
- Origin: 1965
- Merger of: Reformed Presbyterian Church, General Synod and Evangelical Presbyterian Church
- Merged into: Presbyterian Church in America (1982)
- Congregations: 145 in 1977
- Members: 25,448 in 1977
- Ministers: 385 in 1977

The Reformed Presbyterian Church, Evangelical Synod was a Reformed and Presbyterian denomination in the United States and Canada between 1965 and 1982.

== Formation ==
The RPCES was formed in 1965 with the union of the Reformed Presbyterian Church, General Synod and the Evangelical Presbyterian Church (formerly the Bible Presbyterian Church-Columbus Synod) at Covenant College in Lookout Mountain, GA held joint Synod meeting. The uniting service was held at 10:00 a.m. on Tuesday, April 6, 1965, and this service was followed by sessions of the 143rd General Synod of the Reformed Presbyterian Church, Evangelical Synod. The business of the united synods was concluded on April 8, 1965. The denomination experienced immediate growth.

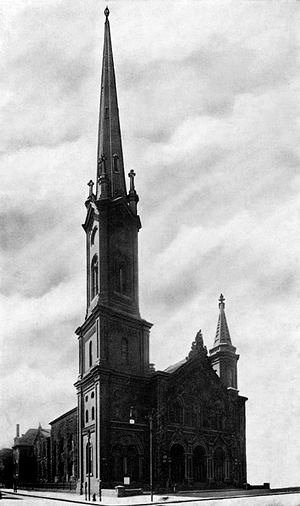
Tenth Presbyterian Church building in Philadelphia, PA become affiliated with the Evangelical Synod

The denomination subscribed to the 1647 version of the Westminster Confession of Faith; however, the plan of union to form the denomination, in a concession to the largely premillennial Evangelical Presbyterian Church, called for modifications to the Larger Catechism to make it more hospitable to those who held to a premillennial eschatology. It practiced traditional worship and was conservative in its theology. The RPCES had also planned to include resolutions warning members against the evils of dancing, liquor, television, gambling and tobacco, again, in a concession to the Evangelical Presbyterian Church's Bible Presbyterian heritage, yet these resolutions, despite being a basis for the merger, had no binding legislative power.

The Orthodox Presbyterian Church invited the RPCES to organic union third time (OPC had fraternal relation with the Evangelical Presbyterian Church (1961) The OPC had extensive contact with this latter group already since 1945, when a committee was established to investigate the possibility of union with them 2 times, in 1949, and in 1959 unsuccessful.) The 42nd General Assembly of the OPC voted 95-42 in favour of the proposed union, but the vote in the RPCES failed to gain the two-thirds majority required to approve the plan.

== Developments ==
In 1975, the RPCES collaborated with the Orthodox Presbyterian Church, the Reformed Presbyterian Church of North America, the Presbyterian Church in America and the Christian Reformed Church in North America in forming a fellowship of Presbyterian churches known as the North American Presbyterian and Reformed Council (NAPARC), an alliance of conservative Reformed denominations in the U.S., as an alternative to both the liberal National Council of Churches and the National Association of Evangelicals, a more broadly based conservative group encompassing theologies considered objectionable by Reformed devotees, namely Arminianism.

Year	Membership	Number of Churches
1965	10,400	109
1968	14,927	115
1971	17,800	129
1973	21,564	140
1974	22,452	140
1975	23,719	151
1976	24,248	142
1977	25,448	145

Almost all United Presbyterian Church of North America-heritage congregations - which was more conservative than the PC-USA - entered into the present Presbyterian Church (USA) (which succeeded the UPCUSA in 1983), but some of more evangelical conservative orientation departed in the 1970s to denominations such as the Reformed Presbyterian Church, Evangelical Synod later the Presbyterian Church in America and the EPC. In 1979, the General Assembly of the United Presbyterian Church in the United States of America ruled that all congregations must elect both men and women to the office of ruling elder. The ruling resulted in an exodus of approximately forty congregations, including Tenth Presbyterian Church in Philadelphia, Tenth and with many others affiliated with the Reformed Presbyterian Church, Evangelical Synod.

At the time of the merger the RPCES had 25,718 communicant members in 187 congregations served by 400 teaching elders. The PCA had 519 churches, 91,060 communicant members, and 480 teaching elders. After the merger the PCA membership was 706 churches, 116,788 communicant members, and 1,276 teaching elders.

== Merger ==
After three years of talks, in 1982, the RPCES was received into the Presbyterian Church in America in a process known as "joining and receiving." At that time the church had 189 congregations (perhaps the most notable being Tenth Presbyterian Church in Philadelphia) with 25,000 communicant members and 482 ministers. From its founding date, the RPCES experienced a rapid membership growth, more than 400 percent. The Evangelical Synod had 17 presbyteries; 13 of those voted for, and 4 voted against, the PCA union. Notable members were Francis Schaeffer, Gordon H. Clark, and Robert G. Rayburn.

== Seminary ==
The RPCES had its own seminary, the Covenant Theological Seminary in St. Louis, Missouri, along with Covenant College in Lookout Mountain, Georgia, which had been under EPC auspices prior to the merger.

== See also ==
- Presbyterian Church in America
- Evangelical Presbyterian Church (1961)
- Bible Presbyterian Church
- Orthodox Presbyterian Church
- North American Presbyterian and Reformed Council
