= College religious organizations =

Faith-based services provide access to activities, events, and counseling that allow college students to pursue spiritual growth and development. Many campuses offer multi-faith spaces, ministering to those who identify with a specific religious group or those who consider themselves spiritual but not religious. As diversity has been increasing among students in colleges and universities, multi-faith spaces have helped schools accommodate various religious beliefs. These spaces are not churches, mosques, temples, or any specific religious building, but general spaces for one to worship and practice their faith. They can help promote spirituality and connection to one's own religion. Because they are general spaces, there are no specific icons particular to any religion present. An example of a multi-faith space is a college chapel, also known as "non-denominational chapels." These are used by many different religions for various purposes. They typically have a place for worship, a space for rituals (washings), and meditation/prayer rooms. In colleges, these serve as a space for students to practice their religion and hold events. However, this space is used by religious and non-religious students alike, so it can be used to hold religious/non-religious events.

== Canadian campus faith and spirituality ==
Many Canadian universities offer multi-faith chaplaincy services. Chaplains may offer faith-specific support and counselling for students, staff, and faculty dealing with stress, grief or loneliness, or they can be present for non-religious students with questions about faith and for those wrestling with spiritual meaning in their lives. Overall, chaplains are committed to supporting the spiritual well-being of the university community using a holistic approach. Chaplains can run worship services, social events, or meal programs. Universities may offer multi-faith rooms for prayer or reflection.

== Christian groups ==
The need for pastoral services in secular universities can be traced back to the writings of John Henry Newman advocating for societies of Catholic students to be established at secular universities in England. The rising popularity of public universities in many parts of the world over sectarian private universities also necessitated a need for Christian ministerial services for students. In the United States, the belief is that the church's ministry should resonate and be a part of the lives and experiences of students and faculty. They want the faith to become relevant to everyday life. As a result, the church feels it is their duty and concern to bring Christian ministry to college campuses in public and private institutions. This can look like Christian churches in the vicinity of colleges and universities providing worship, instruction, and other ministerial services such as pastoral care to local students.

=== Roman Catholic ===
In the United States there are about 250 Catholic Newman Centers that minister to Catholic students at public universities. They trace their origin to the Newman movement and are ministered by laypeople, local parishes, or religious institutes. More recently, lay apostolates such as the Fellowship of Catholic University Students (FOCUS), established in 1997, are ministering to and re-evangelizing Catholic university students and young adults.

=== Protestant ===
Protestant Christian and ecumenical groups following their establishment also created ministries especially focused on evangelizing students. One most recognizable group is Cru, originally known as Campus Crusade for Christ, an interdenominational Christian ministry established in 1951 on the campus of UCLA which has ministries in over a thousand universities. Various other evangelical groups have worldwide networks of campus ministries including the International Fellowship of Evangelical Students, World Student Christian Federation, and The Navigators. Often Protestant denominations will also have a related para-church student fellowship ministry or college group directly or indirectly affiliated with their denomination, sometimes named by it. Additionally, independent churches will often have college ministries which may extend onto constituent college campuses in the form of a student organization. List of multi-campus protestant college ministries:

- Adventist Christian Fellowship of the Seventh-day Adventist Church
- American Baptist Campus Ministry of the American Baptist Convention
- Baptist Student Union of the Southern Baptist Convention
- Chi Alpha (multi-denominational but nationally affiliated with: Chi Alpha Campus Ministries of the Assemblies of God)
- Coalition for Christian Outreach (CCO)
- Cru, originally Campus Crusade for Christ
- Inter Collegiate Prayer Fellowship
- International Fellowship of Evangelical Students
- InterVarsity Christian Fellowship
- Lutheran Student Movement of the Evangelical Lutheran Church in America
- Missionary Baptist Student Fellowship of the American Baptist Association
- The Navigators
- Reformed University Fellowship of the Presbyterian Church in America
- UKirk of the Presbyterian Church (USA)
- Wesley Foundation of the United Methodist Church
- World Student Christian Federation
- Young Life College

=== Orthodox ===
==== India ====
- Mar Gregorios Orthodox Christian Student Movement (MGOCSM) of the Malankara Orthodox Syrian Church
- Mor Gregorios Jacobite Student Movement of the Jacobite Syrian Church

== Jewish groups ==
- Chabad on Campus Foundation
- Hillel Society
- World Union of Jewish Students and regional affiliates
