= Mark Dalbey =

Theological seminary faculty member

- Occupation: Former president of Covenant Theological Seminary
- Spouse: Beth Dalbey

Mark Dalbey is an American theologian and academic administrator. He is the former president of Covenant Theological Seminary in St. Louis, Missouri, the denominational seminary of the Presbyterian Church in America. He was appointed vice president of academics in 2009, prior to which he served as the dean of students for ten years. He began teaching at Covenant in 1999 as an assistant professor of practical theology, following almost twenty years in ordained pastoral ministry. Dalbey has a BA in philosophy and religion from Tarkio College, an M.Div. from Pittsburgh Theological Seminary, and a D.Min. from Covenant Theological Seminary. Dalbey previously served as a pastor in Cincinnati, Ohio, and taught at Geneva College, Pennsylvania.

== Head of Covenant Theological Seminary ==
As of April 28, 2012, Dalbey was the acting president of Covenant Theological Seminary, when his office announced of decisions by the board of trustees, that Dr Bryan Chapell, current president of Covenant Seminary, will be transitioning from sabbatical to the newly created position of chancellor, and Dalbey will assume the position of interim president. On September 26, 2013, Dalbey was inaugurated as president. He served as president until June 30, 2021.

Academic offices
Preceded by Bryan Chapell	President of Covenant Theological Seminary; 2013–2021	Succeeded by Tom Gibbs
