= Flowers of sulfur tests =

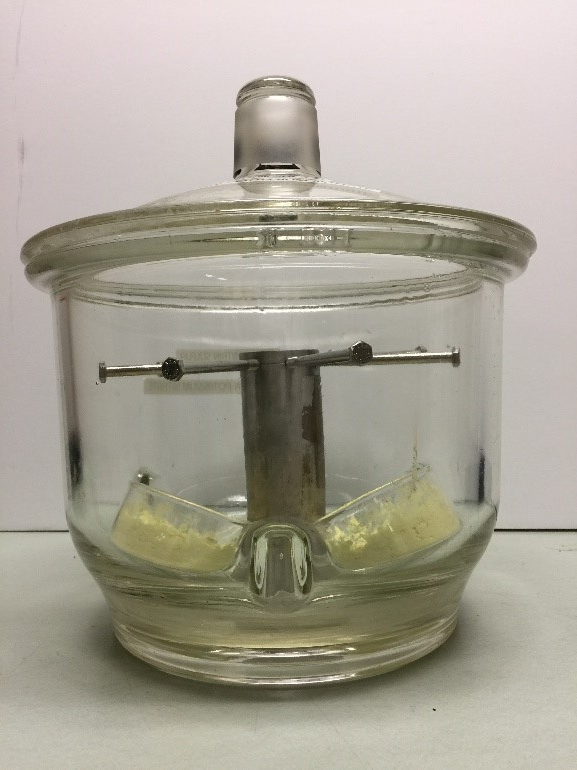
Vacuum desiccator bell jar with 316 stainless steel sample tree, dishes with flowers of sulfur and saturated potassium nitrate solution in the bottom.

Flowers of sulfur (FOS) testing was developed to determine the porosity of metallic coatings susceptible to sulfur induced corrosion [see below ASTM B809-95(2018)]. Applicable substrates are silver, copper, copper alloys and any other metal or metal alloy with which sulfur will react. For porosity testing, coatings can be single or multiple layers of any metal that is not corroded and sealed by a self-limiting reaction in the reducing sulfur environment of the FOS test. The simplest recommended technique is to identify any porosity of the coating as revealed by the presence of surface spots. These surface spots form where the environmental sulfur has penetrated and reacted with the base metal, producing a metal sulfide. Chalcocite, copper (I) sulfide is dark-grey to black. Silver (I) sulfide is also grey-black.

The adoption of lead-free solders and lead-free soldering motivated the further development and application of immersion silver plating. Immersion silver improves wettability and solderability. Mixed flowing gas testing failed to alert the electronics manufacturing industry to weaknesses in immersion silver plating (for example, see Reference 7). This furthered the application of FOS. In particular, it was determined that moist, high-sulfur environments facilitated creep corrosion. The development of FOS testing for creep corrosion was furthered by efforts under the auspices of the International Electronics Manufacturing Initiative (INEMI) and the Surface Mount Technology Association (SMTA) by Haley Fu, et al. and Prabjit Singh et al. MFG testing also proved unreliable for high-sulfur environmental testing of chip resistors and their certification as sulfur resistant. There has been recent development in utilizing FOS testing for porosity of conformal coatings.

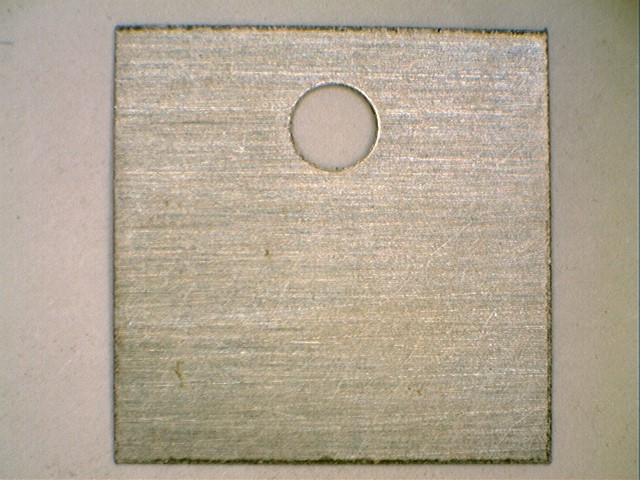
Nominally 1 square centimeter silver coupon cleaned per ASTM B810-01a (Reapproved 2017) Cleaning Method I

The material under test is suspended inside a container over a source of powdered sulfur. The powdered sulfur is placed in a dish. The temperature and internal humidity of the container are regulated. Temperature is typically controlled by placing the container in a constant temperature oven. Humidity inside the container is typically controlled with a saturated salt solution whose vapor pressure is well characterized at the temperature of the test. Saturated potassium nitrate solution is standard practice for humidity control in humid sulfur vapor testing. The saturated salt solution is placed physically outside of the sulfur containing dish. The sulfur containing dish may “float” in the saturated salt solution. The dish should provide an ample, available powdered sulfur surface.

Recommended materials for the test chamber are glass and acrylic. The materials under test must be suspended or supported above the saturated salt solution. Suspension materials are also recommended fabricated from glass or plastic. Frames made out of 316 stainless steel have seen use for hanging specimens. Monofilament line has been used for hanging objects under test. Recommended specimen placement is at least 75 mm from the surfaces of the sulfur and the saturated salt solutions, at least 25 mm from all internal vessel surfaces and at least 10 mm spacing from specimen to specimen.

Standard test procedures call for performing the specimen exposure at 50 °C for at least 24 hours. Activity of the sulfur and its products with humid air increase with temperature. Exposure periods can be extended into the week range. Decisions on length of exposure is commonly motivated by observations from shorter-term tests. Standard procedure calls for equilibrating the test chamber at temperature and relative humidity before inserting the test specimens.

Porosity results are determined by the distribution, number and sizes of dark spots on the materials under test. Again, the dark spots are due to reaction of the moist sulfur vapors with the underlying silver or copper material. One may choose to include silver or both silver and copper reference coupons into the humid sulfur test. The accumulation of copper(I) sulfate and silver (I) sulfate deposits on the coupons, determined by weight change, allows comparisons to ISA 71.04 severity levels for mixed flowing gas testing.

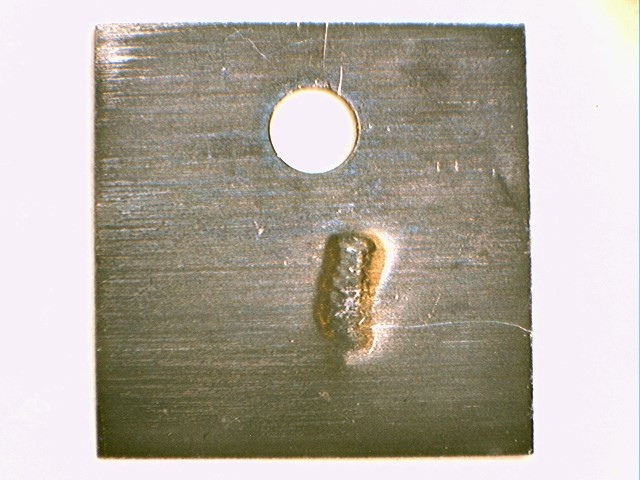
Cleaned silver coupon exposed to flowers of sulfur for five days at 50 °C over saturated potassium nitrate solution (engraved with sample number).

== Industry specifications ==
- ASTM B374-06(2011) — Standard Terminology Relating to Electroplating
- ASTM B542-13 — Standard Terminology Relating to Electrical Contacts and Their Use
- ASTM B735-16 — Standard Test Method for Porosity in Gold Coatings on Metal Substrates by Nitric Acid Vapor
- ASTM B765-03(2018) — Standard Guide for Selection of Porosity and Gross Defect Tests for Electrodeposits and Related Metallic Coatings
- ASTM B798-95(2014) — Standard Test Method for Porosity in Gold or Palladium Coatings on Metal Substrates by Gel-Bulk Electrography
- ASTM B799-95(2014) — Standard Test Method for Porosity in Gold and Palladium Coatings by Sulfurous Acid/Sulfur-Dioxide Vapor
- ASTM B809-95(2018) — Standard Test Method for Porosity in Metallic Coatings by Humid Sulfur Vapor ("Flowers-of-Sulfur")
- ASTM B810-01a (Reapproved 2017) —Standard Method for Calibration of Atmospheric Corrosion Test Chambers by Change in Mass of Copper Coupons
- ANSI/ISA-71.04-2013 Environmental Conditions for Process Measurement and Control Systems: Airborne Contaminants, The International Society of Automation, Research Triangle Park, NC.
