= Phillip Sandifer =

American writer, musician, recording artist and music producer

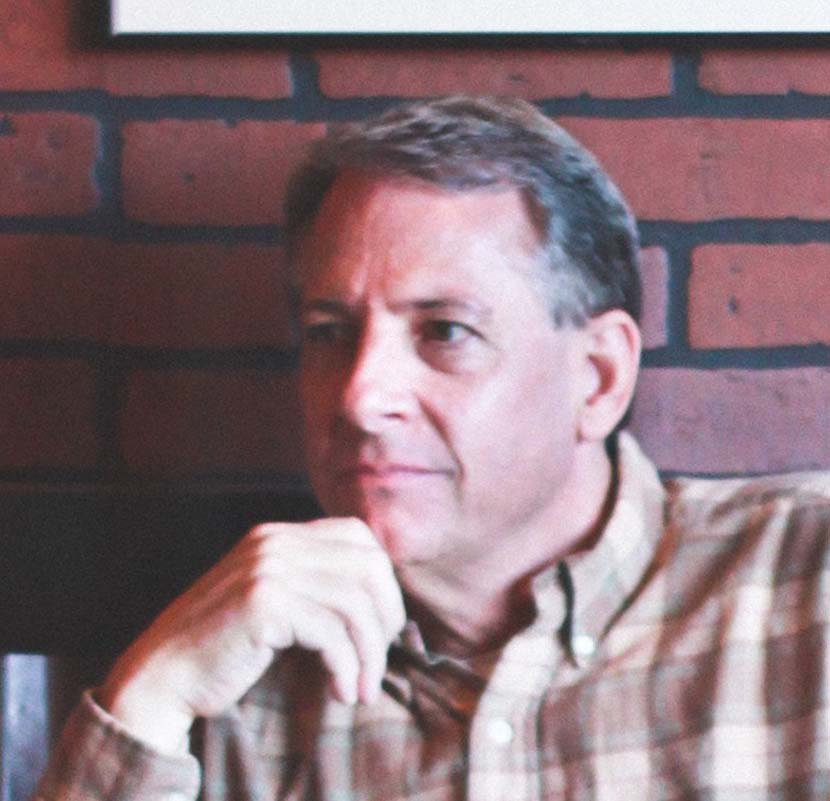
- Phillip Sandifer photo shoot for "Recently Played"

Background information
- Born: 1959 (age 66–67); Baltimore, Maryland, United States
- Genres: Americana/Country & Contemporary Christian
- Occupations: Musician, music producer, writer, recording artist

Phillip Sandifer (born 10 May 1959) is an American writer, musician, recording artist and music producer. His music is primarily known within the Americana and Inspirational music field.

== Personal life ==
Phillip Sandifer was born in Baltimore, Maryland on 10 May 1959 but moved to Dallas, Texas as a youth. He attended Highland Park High School, Auburn University (Auburn, Alabama) and the University of Texas at Austin where he received a degree in history. He holds master's degrees from Texas A & M University (College Station, Texas), Clemson University (Clemson, South Carolina) and Gordon-Conwell Theological Seminary (South Hamilton, MA), a Doctor of Ministry degree from Covenant Theological Seminary (St. Louis, MO), and a PhD from The University of Southern Mississippi. He has been married to Rene Burchard Sandifer since 1984. They have four grown children.

== Music career ==
Sandifer began his music career in 1981, when he created an album on a minimal budget. He has authored and performed 22 top 40 Adult Contemporary songs and six #1 inspirational songs (as noted in CCM Magazine and The Christian Research Report) in the Inspirational Music field. Sandifer acknowledges that while financial gain may elude those choosing the route of the independent label there is a great deal of satisfaction in creating largely on one's own terms. While not as visible as many artists, maintaining artistic control over his music has allowed for a career described as "constant" and music described as "consistent". Early advice from his godfather, Dallas lawyer Shannon Jones who helped bring the Buddy Holly bill (which protects the persona, likeness, and creative works of artists) into being has guided many of Sandifer's career decisions. His releases have been distributed on Urgent Records (Austin, TX) through Sparrow Records (now known as EMI Christian Music) followed by Benson Music Group (now known as Provident-Integrity Distribution) and Wider Sky through The Orchard (Sony Music Entertainment).

Sandifer has recorded with such artists as Jennifer Warnes, Wendi Foy (Sierra), Billy Crockett, Bob Bennett and Michele Wagner and written music for Glen Campbell, Fernando Ortega, Bob Bennett, Kim Hill, Cheri Keaggy, Rob Frazier, Dawn Smith Jordan (Miss South Carolina), Gary Powell and others. He has participated on recordings distributed by EMI, Disney, BMG Music and Warner Music Group although most of his solo recordings have been released on Urgent Records (Austin, TX), an independent label founded by Sandifer in 1984, Selfless Music and more recently Wider Sky Music.

== Current ==
In 1998 Sandifer participated in Disney Records "A Bugs Life Sing Along" which was nominated for a Grammy Award in 1999. In 1999 he withdrew from the music industry in order to focus on expanding Christian radio's reach in the Austin, Texas metro area. In 2000 he joined a local church staff in order to participate in furthering the involvement of the contemporary arts in church settings. In 2004 he participated as a guest vocalist on his second Disney Recording – "Luv-A-Byes", recording the Kenny Loggins classic (and one of Phillip's favorites) "Return To Pooh Corner".

Between 1999 and 2005 Sandifer participated in launching four new radio stations broadcasting largely Christian music programming in the Austin, TX area. In addition, he launched a local community radio station (KDRP-LP, aka K-Drip) to serve his local community of Dripping Springs, TX. KDRP played an eclectic mix of music including Texana flavored music and involved many local personalities. KDRP evolved into the Sun Radio network in the hands of Sandifer's successor owners.

In 2010–11 he renewed his writing and recording career releasing two new solo projects "Prone To Calamity" and "Expressions: Songs Of Worship" (an album of worship songs). Of "Prone To Calamity" Cross Rhythm's Phil Thomson noted "This has to be one of the best self-produced albums I have come across in many a year". In January 2012 Sandifer released "Simple Hymns". Of "Simple Hymns" Cross Rhythm's Tony Cummings noted Phillip's "warm, Dan Fogelberg-sounding voice and beautifully picked guitar". Cummings further regarded Sandifer's renditions of "Be Thou My Vision", "Blessed Assurance" and "Great Is Thy Faithfulness" as showing "the veteran to be one of the most underrated song interpreters around". "Recently Played" was released in 2016 followed up with "Go On" which The Roots Music Report heralded as one of the top 200 Americana projects released in 2018. In August 2019 Phillip founded The School Arts Initiative Charitable Foundation, a foundation dedicated to aiding public school district fine arts programs obtain supplemental funding. In the spring of 2020 Sandifer released a music video "Someone Else" to call attention to the shortage of personal protective equipment during the COVID-19 pandemic. In the summer and fall of 2020 Sandifer released the music videos "Weep For Angry Christians", "If This Were A Flood" and "Turn This Ship Around" dealing with the pandemic and the political turmoil of 2020.

In October 2020 Phillip's song "Turn This Ship Around" was included on the album "Hope Rises", a compilation project produced by Noel Paul Stookey (Peter, Paul and Mary) and Neale Eckstein. Phillip also released a new 10 song album worldwide in January 2021 entitled "Shoo The Cat Away" which includes songs written throughout the early days of the pandemic and referencing the turbulent political and spiritual upheaval of 2020.

== Discography (artist) ==
- Never Steal The Show (1981) Urgent Records
- On My Way (1984) Urgent Records
- Keeping The Dream Alive (1986) Urgent Records
- Constant (1988) Urgent Records
- Christmas in Our Time with Bob Bennett, Billy Crockett, Wendy Foy (1989) Urgent Records
- Phillip Sandifer (1989) Urgent Records
- The Other Side of Salvation (1991) Urgent Records
- Arizona Highway (1994) Urgent Records
- Passages:The Fruits Of The Spirit (1994) Benson Music Group
- Moon Circles – Santa Fe (1997) Urgent Records
- A Bug's Life Sing-Along (1998) Disney Records
- Sensible Enigmas (1999) Urgent Records
- The Best Of Phillip Sandifer I (2001) Urgent Records
- The Best Of Phillip Sandifer II (2004) Urgent Records
- Luv-a-Byes (2006) Disney Records
- Prone To Calamity (2011) Wider Sky/The Orchard/Sony Music Entertainment
- Simple Hymns (2012) Wider Sky/The Orchard/Sony Music Entertainment
- Of Songs and Sacraments (2014) Wider Sky/The Orchard/Sony Music Entertainment
- Recently Played (2015) Wider Sky/The Orchard/Sony Music Entertainment
- Go On (2018) Wider Sky/The Orchard/Sony Music Entertainment
- Hope Rises (2020) Music To Life
- Shoo The Cat Away (2020) Wider Sky/The Orchard/Sony Music Entertainment

== Discography (producer) ==
- Keeping The Dream Alive (Phillip Sandifer) (1986) Urgent Records
- The Urgency Of Praise (Various Artists) (1991) Urgent Records
- Windows & Doors (Catherine King) (1991) Urgent Records
- In A Welcome Field (Fernando Ortega) – Executive Producer* (1992) Urgent Records
- The Urgency Of Praise II (Various Artists) (1993) Urgent Records
- How Far (Dawn Smith Jordan) (1993) Heart & Soul Music
- Arizona Highway (Phillip Sandifer) (1994) Urgent Records
- Canopy (Dawn Smith Jordan) (1995) Heart & Soul Music
- Unchained Heart (Linda Richards) (1996) Heart & Soul Music
- Songs For The Heart & Soul (Various Artists) (1995) Heart & Soul Music
- A Moment Alone (Dawn Smith Jordan) (1998) Heart & Soul Music
- Sensible Enigmas (Phillip Sandifer) (1999) Urgent Records
- Everyday Praise (Dawn Smith Jordan) (2001) Heart & Soul Music
- Addison (Addison Hayes) (2002)
- This Far (Dawn Smith Jordan) (2011) Wider Sky/The Orchard/Sony Music Entertainment
- Prone To Calamity (Phillip Sandifer) (2011) Wider Sky/The Orchard/Sony Music Entertainment
- Simple Hymns (Phillip Sandifer) (2012) Wider Sky/The Orchard/Sony Music Entertainment
- Chasing Grace EP (Chasing Grace) (2012) Independent
- Timeless Hymns (Dawn Smith Jordan) (2012) Wider Sky/The Orchard/Sony Music Entertainment
- It's Cool To Build A School (Various Artists) (2013) Wider Sky/The Orchard/Sony Music Entertainment
- Of Songs and Sacraments (Phillip Sandifer) (2014) Wider Sky/The Orchard/Sony Music Entertainment
- Recently Played (Phillip Sandifer) (2015) Wider Sky/The Orchard/Sony Music Entertainment
- Go On (Phillip Sandifer) (2018) Wider Sky/The Orchard/Sony Music Entertainment
- Timeless Hymns, Volume II (Dawn Smith Jordan) (2019) Wider Sky/The Orchard/Sony Music Entertainment
- Shoo The Cat Away (Phillip Sandifer) (2020) Wider Sky/The Orchard/Sony Music Entertainment
