= Jim Rayburn =

American ordained Presbyterian minister (1909–1970)

- Jim Rayburn in 1952
- Born: James Chalmers Rayburn Jr; July 21, 1909; Marshalltown, Iowa
- Died: December 11, 1970 (aged 61); Colorado Springs, Colorado
- Education: Kansas State University (BS); Dallas Seminary (M.Div.)
- Known for: Founder of Young Life
- Spouse: Helen Maxine Stanley
- Children: 3
- Relatives: Robert Rayburn (brother)
- Jim Rayburn's voice Rayburn in 1952

Jim Rayburn, Jr (July 21, 1909 – December 11, 1970) was an American ordained Presbyterian minister and the founder of Young Life.

== Early life and education ==
He was born in Marshalltown, Iowa to James Chalmers Rayburn, Sr. (an evangelist for the Presbyterian Church), and Elna Beck Rayburn. Rayburn was the oldest of four sons and grew up in Newton, Kansas. His younger brother, Robert, became the founding president of both Covenant College and Covenant Theological Seminary.

Rayburn graduated from Kansas State University in 1941 with a Bachelor of Science degree in mineralogy. In 1936, Rayburn began his seminary education at Dallas Theological Seminary. While there, he was significantly influenced by the seminary's founder, Lewis Sperry Chafer.

== Career ==
Rayburn founded Young Life (originally known as Young Life Campaign), a Christian youth organization, after earning his master's degree. Rayburn left the presidency of Young Life in 1964.

He was a pioneer in the field of evangelism and was admired by many of the leading Christians of his day. He was known for his ability to communicate the gospel and his passion for Christ. Rayburn's personal journals were published in 2008 as The Diaries of Jim Rayburn.

== Personal life ==
In 1932, Rayburn married Helen Maxine Stanley. The couple had three children. Maxine Rayburn died in 1997. He died on December 11, 1970, at his home in Colorado Springs, Colorado.
