= Reformed Presbyterian Church, General Synod =

- Orientation: conservative Calvinist
- Theology: Reformed
- Polity: Presbyterian
- Region: United States
- Origin: 1833; USA
- Branched from: Reformed Presbyterian Church of Scotland
- Merged into: Reformed Presbyterian Church, Evangelical Synod in 1965
- Congregations: 21 (1961)
- Members: 2,403 (1961)

The Reformed Presbyterian Church, General Synod was a Presbyterian denomination in the United States that came about due to a split amongst the Reformed Presbyterians, or Covenanters and existed between 1833 and 1965.

== History ==
The division had come about in 1833 between the Old and New Light Covenanters. The Old Lights had refused to swear allegiance to the constitution and thus become citizens, whereas the New Lights decide to allow for it. While the Old Light side was generally known as the Reformed Presbyterian Church of North America, the New Light was generally known as the Reformed Presbyterian Church, General Synod.

Initially, the church did well, including sending missionaries to India, and adopting both a Book of Discipline and a Directory for Public Worship. However, division soon began to plague the church, with a faction in Philadelphia arguing that the RPCGS had spent too much time arguing doctrinal points, as opposed to pursuing union with other Presbyterian denominations. Indeed, the Synod had rejected a plan of union with the United Presbyterian Church of North America in 1859. Debates on issues such as exclusive psalmody, the use of instruments in worship, and union with the UPCNA led to even further dissension and division in the church.

The first Stated Clerk of the RPCGS was Rev. John Black.

The General Synod began shrinking in the 19th century and the early 20th century. At its low point the denomination had only 9 organized churches. In the 1940s and 1950s with new pastors it began to grow, planting new congregations in the USA. In 1965 there were 28 churches.

== Merger with the Evangelical Presbyterian Church ==
By the 1950s, the RPCGS had been moving away from its Covenanter heritage, including dropping its Reformation Principles Exhibited (1807) as a subordinate standard in 1959, and had also been looking to merge with another denomination.

Eventually, thanks to influence of newer people in the denomination such as Gordon Clark, discussions began with the Bible Presbyterian Church-Columbus Synod, which included members such as Francis Schaeffer and Jay E. Adams. During the years of negotiations, the BPC-Columbus Synod would eventually rename itself, becoming the Evangelical Presbyterian Church.

In 1965, after coming to negotiations that had included revising the Westminster Larger Catechism to be more open to Premillennial eschatology, and resolutions against alcohol, the Evangelical Presbyterian Church and the Reformed Presbyterian Church, General Synod celebrated a union at the EPC's Covenant College in Georgia, adopting the name the Reformed Presbyterian Church, Evangelical Synod.

The RPCES would eventually merge with the Presbyterian Church in America in 1982.
