= Lloyd Kim =

American Presbyterian minister (born 1972)

Lloyd Kim (born April 10, 1972) is a Presbyterian minister and the coordinator of Mission to the World, the missions agency of the Presbyterian Church in America (PCA).

== Background ==
A native of California, Dr. Kim graduated from UC Berkeley with a degree in engineering and worked as a consultant with Ernst & Young before getting his M.Div. at Westminster Seminary in Escondido and his doctorate in New Testament studies at Fuller Theological Seminary in Pasadena, California. He served as associate pastor with New Life Mission Church (PCA) in Fullerton, California, before joining MTW.

== Missions ==
In 2004 Dr. Kim and his wife, Eda, a medical doctor, were sent by MTW to Manila in the Philippines. In 2007 he worked as country director of Cambodia in which he helped facilitate the planting of several churches, while also serving as field director for the Southeast Asia Partnership. In addition, Dr. Kim taught and provided teaching resources for several theological institutions as the director of theological education for Asia-Pacific.
