= Flowers of sulfur =

Very fine, bright yellow sulfur powder that is produced by sublimation and deposition

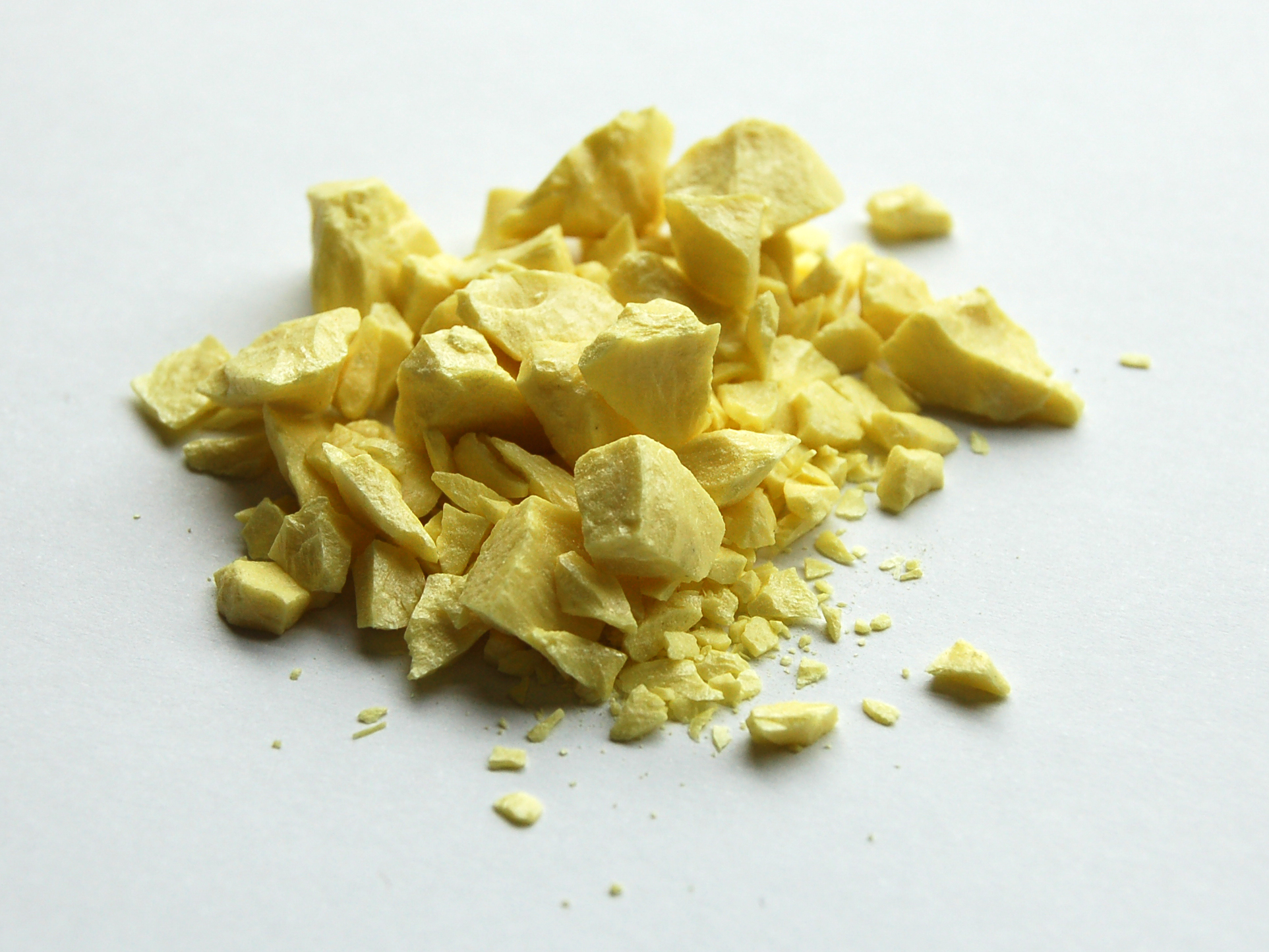
Production of flowers of sulfur occurs mainly through sublimation of natural sulfur

Flowers of sulfur (British spelling flowers of sulphur) is a very fine, bright yellow sulfur powder that is produced by sublimation and deposition. It can contain up to 30% of the amorphous allotrope of sulfur, which is the noncrystalline structure of sulfur. It is known as flores sulphuris by apothecaries and in older scientific works. Natural sulfur was also known as brimstone, hence the alternative name flowers of brimstone.

Flowers of sulfur has unique properties. Production occurs mainly through sublimation of natural sulfur. According to The Sulphur Institute, flowers of sulfur is widely used due to its powdered structure in rubber vulcanization, agricultural dusts, pharmaceutical products, stock feeds. It can also be used in Flowers of Sulfur (FoS) Tests.

== Properties ==
Although similar to chemically pure sulfur, flowers of sulfur has slightly different properties. For instance, sulfur is completely soluble in sulfur dioxide. Flowers of sulfur, however, is insoluble in sulfur dioxide. A study shows that flowers of sulfur is only partially soluble in nitric acid and bromide. Residue still revealed traces of sulfur after the extraction. When lit on fire, flowers of sulfur combust and leave a residue that oxidizes immediately. Flowers of sulfur is completely soluble when heated in anhydrous liquid bromine.

== Production ==
Flowers of sulfur were traditionally produced by subliming naturally occurring sulfur, known as sulphur vivum. Impurities and moisture could cause acid residue in the product, so it was often washed, the result being known as "washed flowers of sulfur" (in Latin, flores sulphuris loti). Distillation of sulfur vapor can also yield flowers of sulfur, by slowly quenching to room temperature.

Flowers of sulfur is commercially available and can be bought through chemical supply companies as well as major e-commerce websites.

== Uses ==
Historically, flowers of sulfur were extensively used medically to cure ailments, particularly skin diseases. Henry Pemberton lists 'Balsam sulphuris', derived from flowers of sulfur, in his 1746 Pharmacopoeia. Sublimed sulfur was applied topically for skin diseases, but was also taken orally or injected for treatment of other diseases. Flowers of sulfur is seen to inhibit bacterial growth in tubercle bacilli, and S. aureus, and C. hominis. More recent sources also show that flowers of sulfur acts a fungicide, insecticide, and fumigant, as well as an agent in the treatment of numerous skin diseases.

In the early 20th century, flowers of sulfur was also widely used for agricultural purposes. It was specifically used in cultivating hop plants to combat and prevent fungal diseases caused by molds that can kill crops. Flowers of sulfur was also used to treat rosebushes similarly. These cases show that flowers of sulfur was one of the earliest fungicides and insecticides used agriculturally. A study done in 1912 shows that a small amount of sulfur affects vegetation growth significantly. With 0.023 g flowers of sulfur per kg of soil, vegetation growth increased by 10 to 40%.

Flowers of Sulfur (FoS) Tests have also been used to test porosity of metallic finishes over silver, copper, and copper alloy substrates. The original FoS test method was standardized by ASTM through ASTM-B809 which was established in 1990. The current version of the standard is ASTM B809-95(2018). This test method is especially good at precipitating silver based failures such as those observed with network chip resistors. The Center for Advanced Life Cycle Engineering (CALCE) and the International Electronics Manufacturing Initiative (iNEMI) have both developed tests based on varying degrees to the ASTM standard.

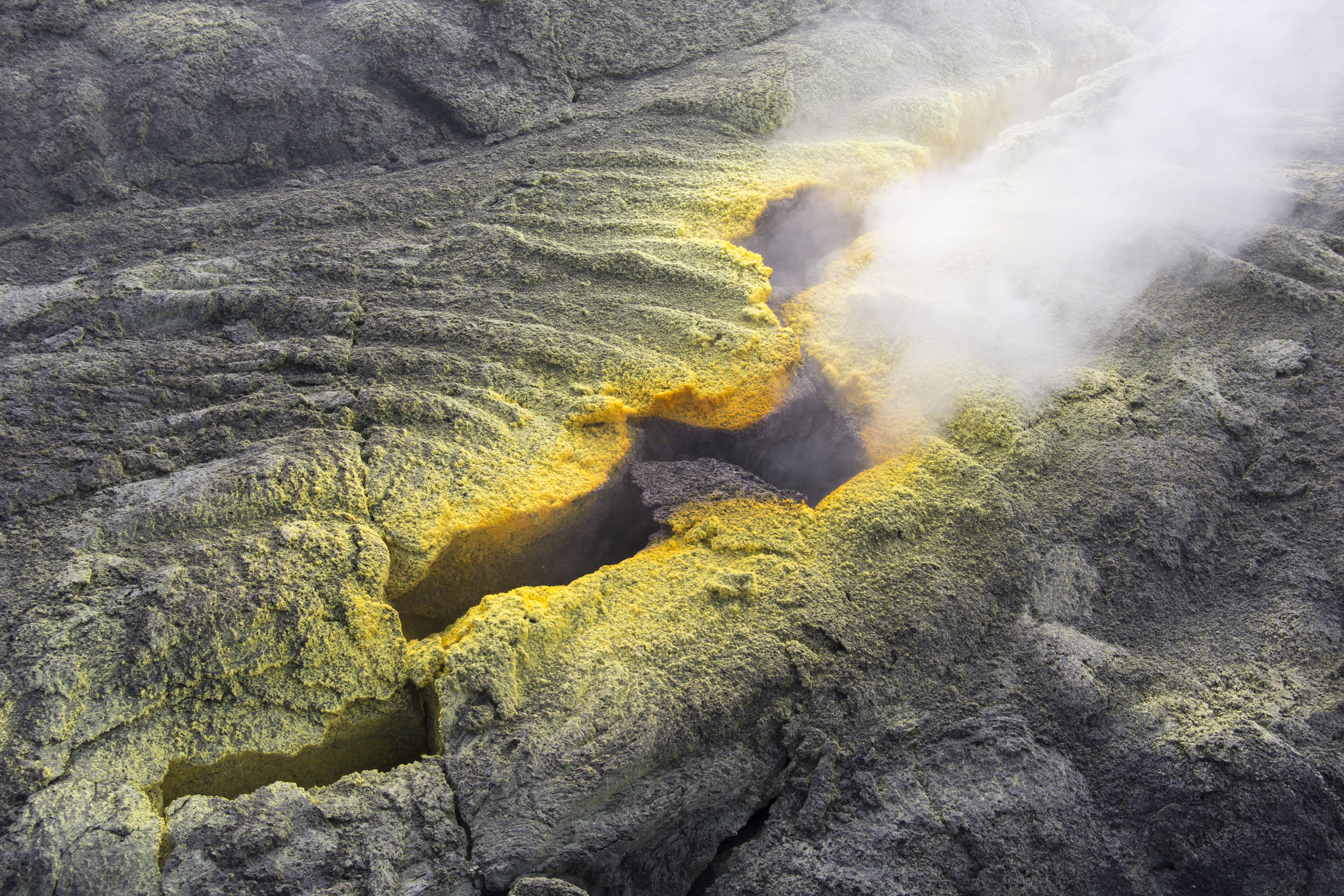
Elemental sulfur vapour rises from the Puʻu ʻŌʻō Crater in Hawaii. The cooled sulfur vapour product is the yellow, powdery substance around the crater.

Flowers of Sulfur can be used as a humid sulfur vapor test for creep corrosion. Creep corrosion is the corrosion of copper or silver caused by sulfur pollution and causes failure in electronic products. Sulfur pollution includes elemental sulfur, sulfur dioxide, and hydrogen sulfide, which can oxidize metals. These compounds can be produced artificially or naturally. Paper mills, craters, and volcanoes are examples of sulfur sources. FoS provides a source of elemental sulfur that can be used to test conformal coatings and have caused creep corrosion on printed circuit boards (PCBs). These tests use PCBs with copper or silver components and are dried by baking. The PCBs are then exposed to constant humidity, temperature, and impurities like sulfur and dust. Airflow and temperature are the only variables in this test that need to be controlled. After a few days, the amount of corrosion and colour is noted. Various analytical methods can be used to examine the product's surface morphology, surface composition, depth profiling, and metal foil thickness. These methods include X-ray photoelectron spectroscopy (XPS), scanning electron microscopy (SEM), energy-dispersive x-ray spectroscopy (EDX), and atomic force microscopy (AFM). A test has found that FoS causes significant creep corrosion due to its hydrophobicity.
