= Mission to the World =

Presbyerian mission-sending agency in America

Mission To The World
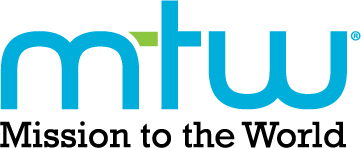
- Classification: Protestant
- Theology: Reformed evangelical
- Governance: Presbyterian
- Origin: December 1973

Mission to the World (MTW) is the global mission-sending agency of the Presbyterian Church in America (PCA), with its headquarters located in Lawrenceville, Georgia, United States. Its primary purpose is to mobilize the PCA to send and fund missionaries across the world. Through the training of leaders and coordination of teams, MTW supports and sends missionaries to spread the Reformed gospel of the Great Commission to strategic countries. In these countries, missionaries backed by MTW are actively spreading the gospel along with Reformed doctrine and planting and nurturing churches while also addressing the physical needs of the people, such as providing disaster relief or medical assistance.

Mission to the World has missionaries or international partners serving in 104 countries. This includes 509 long-term missionaries and 1274 shorter-term workers, including 106 missionaries, 100 volunteer interns and residents, and 1068 trip participants.

Paul Kooistra served as the coordinator from 1994 to 2014. On July 24, 2014, Lloyd Kim was appointed as the new coordinator.

== Headquarters ==
The organization maintains headquarters in Lawrenceville, Georgia, a suburb of Atlanta. The PCA ministry buildings in Lawrenceville are the location from which the ministries of the denomination are coordinated. These ministries are Administrative Committee, Committee on Discipleship Ministries, Geneva Benefits Group, Mission to North America, Mission to the World, PCA Foundation, and Reformed University Fellowship.
