= Highland College =

Coordinates: 34.1331°N 118.1765°W

- Type: Christian liberal arts
- Established: May 4, 1950
- Affiliations: Bible Presbyterian Church
- Location: Pasadena, California, US
- Campus: 450 Avenue 64, Pasadena, California 91105

Highland College was a Christian liberal arts college in Pasadena, California, United States. It was located at 450 Avenue 64, Pasadena, California 91105.

== History ==
Highland College was founded under the leadership of the Dr. Clyde J. Kennedy on May 4, 1950 as an agency of the Bible Presbyterian Church. The Annandale Country Club property was purchased and used as the campus. Subsequently, Robert G. Rayburn became president.

On March 1, 1955, Rayburn was dismissed. Consequently, a split occurred and led to the establishment of Covenant College.

== Notable alumni ==
- Francis Schaeffer

== Leadership ==
- John E. Carson (1950-1952)
- Robert G. Rayburn (1952–1955)
- Lynn Gray Gordon (1955–1957)
- Robert E. Kofahl (1957–unknown)
