= First Presbyterian Church (Jackson, Mississippi) =

First Presbyterian Church of Jackson
- The First Presbyterian Church of Jackson
- Location within Mississippi
- 32.318°N 90.178°W
- Location: 1390 North State Street, Jackson, Mississippi
- Country: United States
- Denomination: Presbyterian Church in America
- Previous denomination: Presbyterian Church in the United States
- Churchmanship: Evangelical, Reformed
- Website: www.fpcjackson.org/

History
- Founded: 8 April 1837

The First Presbyterian Church is a historic congregation currently housed at 1390 North State Street in Jackson, Mississippi. It was founded in 1837.

== Description ==
First Presbyterian Church is the largest Presbyterian church in Mississippi and a flagship and founding congregation of the Presbyterian Church in America. Its communicant membership is over 2,500.

With 3,100 members, it has become the largest Presbyterian congregation in Mississippi and one of the largest in the United States. It has played a significant role in the establishment of the Presbyterian Church in America (PCA), and the congregation has remained one of the flagship congregations of that denomination. Its pastor at the time of the PCA's establishment in 1973, Rev Donald Patterson, was Chairman of the Steering Committee for a Continuing Presbyterian Church and preached at the inaugural PCA General Assembly.

The church played a significant role of establishing the Winter Theological Institution in 1962, which became Reformed Theological Seminary.

In the 1950s and 1960s, FPC excluded black people from the sanctuary. The church published a statement of repentance over this in 2016. The minister and some members of FPC were very influential in the 1992 formation of Mission Mississippi, an ecumenical racial reconciliation initiative. Soon afterwards, however, there was a backlash against the organization within this congregation, dues to the church's historic resistance to the civil rights movement.

Ligon Duncan served as Senior Pastor from 1996 to 2013.

== Doctrine ==
The congregation adheres to the Westminster Confession of Faith.

The church describes itself " A steadfast witness to historic Reformed Christianity for over 175 years".

It is a member of the Mississippi Valley Presbytery.
