= Paul Kooistra =

American college president

Paul Kooistra was the former President of Covenant Theological Seminary and Erskine College.

Kooistra was a Presbyterian minister and the past coordinator of Mission to the World, the missions agency of the Presbyterian Church in America (PCA). He was elected moderator of the 2008-2009 General Assembly of the PCA.

On July 18, 2014, he was elected president of Erskine College, which is affiliated with the Associate Reformed Presbyterian Church. He resigned in 2016. He died on July 1, 2026.

Academic offices
Preceded by William S. Barker	President of Covenant Theological Seminary; 1985–1994	Succeeded by Bryan Chapell
Preceded by David A. Norman	President of Erskine College; 2014–2016	Succeeded by Robert Gustafson
