= Covenant succession =

In Reformed theology, covenant succession is the idea that the children of believers "are expected to succeed in the faith of their parents, and this is accomplished through the divinely ordained means of covenant nurture." Other terms used are covenant expectation, children in the covenant, and practical covenant theology. Robert S. Rayburn describes it as the idea that "the purpose of God that his saving grace run in the lines of generations".

== History ==
In a 1996 article, Robert S. Rayburn argued that covenant succession was held by John Calvin, and other reformers such as Huldrych Zwingli and Heinrich Bullinger. It became the "historic doctrine of the Presbyterian church," appearing in documents such as the Directory for Public Worship. According to Lewis Bevens Schenck, the doctrine was abandoned under the influence of revivalism. In the 19th century, theologians such as R. L. Dabney and J. H. Thornwell held that "baptized covenant children were to be presumed unsaved until they gave evidence of the new birth." Rayburn lamented that in 1996, "the doctrine of covenant succession with its various parts and implications has been largely in eclipse." However, Rayburn's article proved to be influential, and in 2004 Benjamin K. Wikner described him as "the modern patriarch of covenant succession thinking," In 2011, Adam Harwood suggested that the idea was "common in present-day Reformed churches".

== Biblical support ==
Adam Harwood notes that the doctrine of covenant succession is derived from the statement 1 Corinthians 7:14 that the children of believers are "holy". Rayburn also appeals to Genesis 17:7 ("I will be a God to you and to your descendants after you"), and argues that "it is emphatically clear from Deuteronomy to Proverbs to Ephesians that nurture, not evangelism, is the paradigm of childrearing in the covenant home."

== Applications ==
Rayburn argues that the doctrine of covenant succession implies that evangelism should make a distinction "between the church's children and those outside of the community of faith", that Christian parents should be charged with "responsibility for the unbelief of their children," and that parental nurture should be included "in the treatment of the means of grace."

== See also ==
- Covenant theology
- Half-Way Covenant
- Presumptive regeneration
