= William S. Barker =

American church historian (born 1934)

William Shirmer Barker
- Born: 1934 (age 91–92)
- Education: Princeton University, Cornell University, Covenant Theological Seminary & Vanderbilt University
- Movement: Presbyterian Church in America

William Shirmer Barker (born 1934) is an American church historian, educator, and leader.

Barker studied at Princeton University, Cornell University, Covenant Theological Seminary, and Vanderbilt University. He taught at Covenant College before moving to Covenant Theological Seminary in 1972. In 1977 he succeeded Robert G. Rayburn as President of Covenant Seminary, and served in this position until 1984. He then took up a position as editor of Presbyterian Journal, before returning to teaching, this time at Westminster Theological Seminary.

In 1994, Barker was elected Moderator of the Presbyterian Church in America.

Academic offices
| Preceded by Robert G. Rayburn | President of Covenant Theological Seminary; 1977–1984 | Succeeded by Paul Kooistra |
