= Lynn Gray Gordon =

American pastor, Christian educator, army chaplain, and college president

- Born: April 8, 1912; Waxahachie, Texas, US
- Died: June 14, 2003 (aged 91); Melbourne, Florida, US
- Education: Texas Technological College, Faith Theological Seminary

Lynn Gray Gordon, D.D., (April 8, 1912 – June 14, 2003) was an American pastor, Christian educator, army chaplain, and college president.

== Education ==
Lynn Gray Gordon was born on April 8, 1912, in Waxahachie, Ellis, Texas, US.

He received his A.B. (Chem) from Texas Technological College in 1933, and M. Div. from Faith Theological Seminary in May 1949.

He served in the Texas State Department of Health as a sanitary engineer for 5 years, during which time the state sent him to study at Vanderbilt University for one semester (1937), and at the Harvard University Graduate School of Public Health for one year (1938).

== Chaplaincy ==
Following the outbreak of World War II, he served in the Army as a major, sanitary engineer, ending up in the Philippines in 1946. He also served as a US Army chaplain (lieutenant colonel) in Korea.

== Ministry ==
Gordon served in the following capacity:

- General Secretary, The Independent Board for Presbyterian Home Missions (IBPHM) 1962 – 1968
- Vice President, Board of Directors, IBPHM : 1970-?
- General Secretary, The Independent Board for Presbyterian Foreign Missions (IBPFM) 1969 – 1990
- President, IBPFM: 1972 – 1995
- President Emeritus of IBPFM : 1995 – 2003
- President, The Associated Missions of the International Council of Christian Churches 1960-2003
- Second Vice President and Member of Executive Committee of the International Council of Christian Churches

== Publications ==
- Gordon, Lynn Gray. World's Greatest Truths. Singapore: Far Eastern Bible College Press, 1999. ISBN 981-04-1976-7

== Death ==
He died on June 14, 2003, in Melbourne, Brevard, Florida, United States. He is survived by his wife Maurine Ethlyn Ford, in Borger, Texas, whom he married on May 26, 1935.

Academic offices
Preceded by Robert G. Rayburn	President of Highland College; 1955–1957	Succeeded by Robert E. Kofahl

Conciliar offices
Preceded by J. Gordon Holdcroft	President of Independent Board for Presbyterian Foreign Missions; 1972–1995	Succeeded by Earle R. White
