= Sangre de Cristo Seminary =

Christian Reformed higher education school

Coordinates: 38.057°N 105.528°W

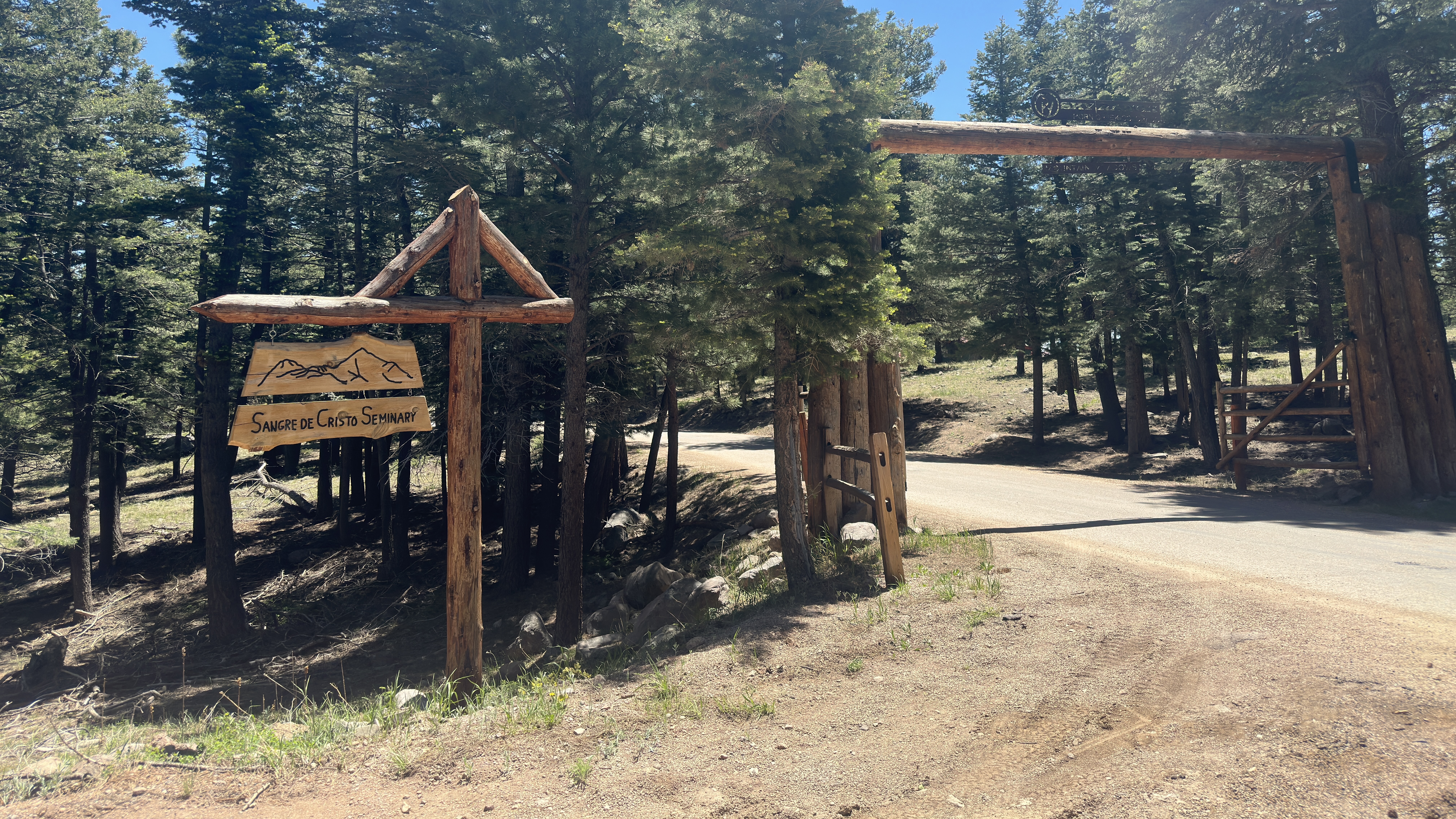
- Sangre de Cristo Seminary Entrance
- Industry: Not for Profit
- Founded: 1976 in Westcliffe, Colorado
- Headquarters: United States
- Key people: Andrew S. Zeller (President) Dwight F. Zeller (Founder)
- Products: Master of Divinity (M.Div.)
- Website: sdcseminary.org

Sangre de Cristo Seminary and School for Biblical Studies was incorporated in 1976 as a non-profit organization.

It is not affiliated with any denomination, but is Reformed in nature. It strongly emphasizes Biblical exegesis and the Biblical languages (Greek and Hebrew). It is fully accredited by the Association of Reformed Theological Seminaries (ARTS).

Its founder and President Emeritus, Dwight Zeller, is the son-in-law of theologian and philosopher Gordon H. Clark.

SDCS is located in rural Colorado, near the town of Westcliffe. Its average class size is 7–14 students. The summer semesters are taught by visiting professors who stay for 1–3 weeks and teach their entire course in that time. In the fall, the core faculty teach Homiletics and Biblical language. The winter semesters are used for the students to complete an exegetical project using the language taught in the previous semester. Hebrew students translate Jonah and Greek students translate Titus.

The school also houses the Gordon H. Clark memorial library, which contains Clark's personal collection. Clark died at the school in 1985.
