= Evangelical Presbyterian Church (established 1956) =

- Classification: Protestant
- Orientation: Presbyterian, Reformed
- Origin: 1956; Columbus, Ohio
- Separated from: Bible Presbyterian Church
- Merged into: Reformed Presbyterian Church, Evangelical Synod in 1965
- Congregations: 169 in 1962
- Members: 6,769 in 1962
- Ministers: 69 in 1962

The Evangelical Presbyterian Church was a Reformed denomination founded in 1956.

== History ==
The church was composed of the majority of the Bible Presbyterian Church which left that denomination over what it felt was the strong influence of Carl McIntire and the fundamentalists, while the new church (then the BPC Columbus Synod) had a stronger emphasis on the Reformed aspect of belief and practice. This split occurred in 1956. Carl McIntire developed into a rather heavy-handed, dictatorial leader in the BP denomination and some of his colleagues like Buswell and Harris and younger men, most notably Donald MacNair and Robert Rayburn, began resisting this trend. Tensions came to a head in 1955, when the entire BP Church numbered about 8,760 members (the OPC was about the same size at this time). About 43% of the church followed McIntire in leaving and they formed what came to be known as the BP Church, Collingswood (NJ) Synod; the majority remained in what was initially known as the BP Church, Columbus (OH) Synod. The BPC-Columbus Synod renamed itself the Evangelical Presbyterian Church in 1961 to avoid the confusion with the Bible Presbyterian church, Collingswood Synod. During this time it also established Covenant College and Covenant Theological Seminary as denominational institutions.

=== Merger ===
The church had a short lifespan, as it entered merger talks with the Reformed Presbyterian Church in North America, General Synod (RPCGS) and merged with that group in 1965 to form the Reformed Presbyterian Church, Evangelical Synod (which itself merged into the Presbyterian Church in America in 1982).

=== The Reformed Presbyterian Church in North America, General Synod ===
The Reformed Presbyterian Church, General Synod adhered to the Solemn League and Covenant and was of the Covenanter tradition. It was formed in 1833 when the Reformed Presbyterian Church divided over issue of allegiance to the Constitution. One group named Reformed Presbyterian Church, General Synod allowed its members to vote and to hold office. The General Synod permitted instrumental music during the worship and adopted hymns and psalms to be sung in the services. The other group the Reformed Presbyterian Church of North America did not allow members to vote and hold office and opposed hymns and instrumental music.

== Notable personalities ==
- J. Oliver Buswell
- Robert G. Rayburn
- Francis Schaeffer

== Sources ==
- Hart, D.G. and Noll, M.A. Dictionary of the Presbyterian and Reformed Tradition in America. Downers Grove, IL: InterVarsity, 1999.
