= Ligon Duncan =

American pastor and scholar

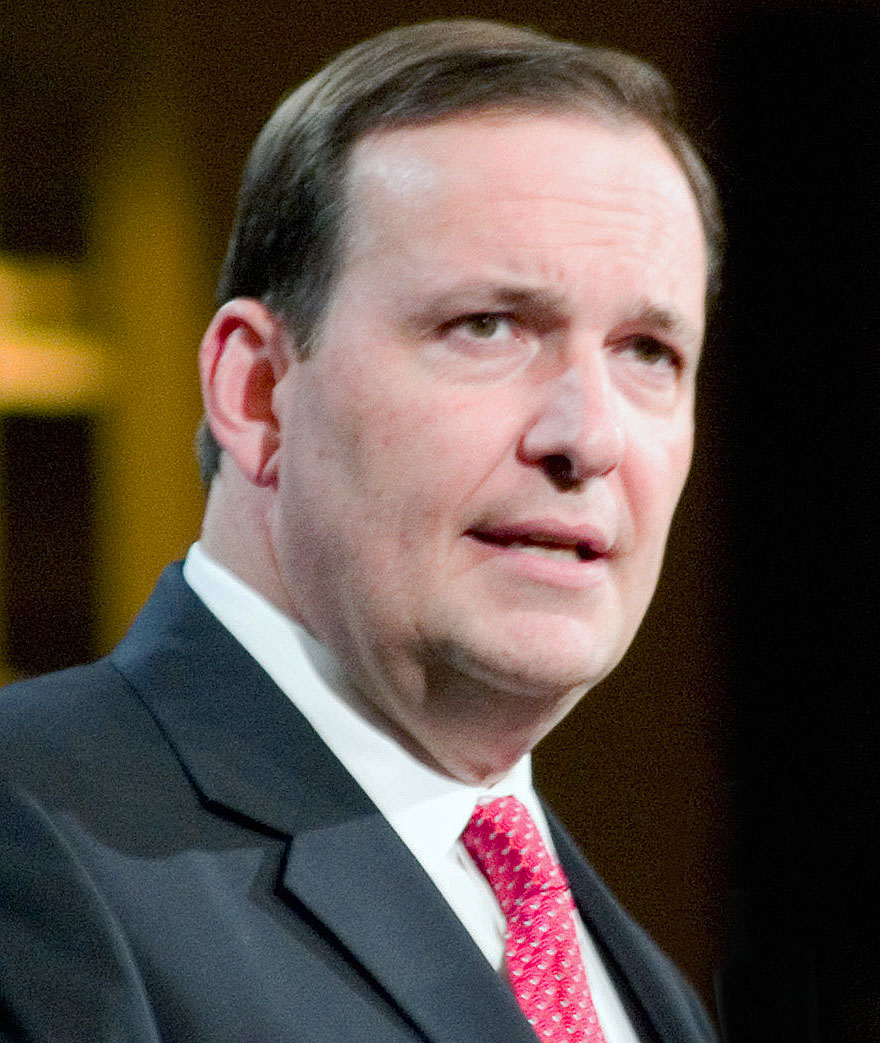
- Born: Jennings Ligon Duncan III; November 29, 1960 (age 65); Greenville, South Carolina
- Education: Furman University (BA); Covenant Theological Seminary (MDiv); University of Edinburgh (PhD)
- Theological work
- Tradition or movement: Presbyterianism, Calvinism
- Main interests: Calvinism, Covenant Theology, Biblical Inerrancy, gender roles
- Notable ideas: Covenant theology, Complementarianism

Jennings Ligon Duncan III (born November 29, 1960) is an American Presbyterian scholar and pastor. He is Chancellor of Reformed Theological Seminary.

== Early life and education ==
Duncan is native to Greenville, South Carolina. His father was an eighth-generation Southern Presbyterian ruling elder. Duncan graduated from Greenville Senior High School in 1979 and Furman University in 1983 (B.A., History). He continued his studies at Covenant Theological Seminary with an M.Div. in 1986 and an MA in historical theology in 1987. He completed doctoral studies in theology at the University of Edinburgh, New College in 1995.

He served on the staff of Covenant Presbyterian Church, St. Louis, (1984–1987). He was licensed to preach in 1985 by Calvary Presbytery (PCA) in South Carolina and was ordained in 1990.

== Institutional and organizational involvement ==
=== Reformed Theological Seminary ===
In the Summer of 1990, Duncan joined the faculty of Reformed Theological Seminary (RTS), Jackson, Mississippi, as the John R. Richardson Chair of Systematic Theology. At the same time he served as assistant pastor of Trinity Presbyterian Church, Jackson, Mississippi (1990–1995), and interim pastor at First Presbyterian Church, Yazoo City, Mississippi (1993).

Effective January 1, 2014, Duncan resigned his position as Sr. Minister at First Presbyterian Church, Jackson, MS, and assumed the role of Chancellor of Reformed Theological Seminary. He continues to teach in the department of Systematic Theology while serving in this role.

=== First Presbyterian Church and the PCA ===
Duncan was named senior pastor at First Presbyterian Church of Jackson, Mississippi (PCA) in 1996, and served in that capacity until early 2014. An active churchman, he has been involved in the courts of the Presbyterian Church in America (PCA) in various ways: General Assembly's Committee on Psalmody; Committees of Commissioners for Covenant Theological Seminary, Mission to North America, and Bills and Overtures; member and chair of the Credentials Committee of the Presbytery of the Mississippi Valley (1996–2002); vice-chair of the General Assembly's Creation Study Committee (1998–2000); member of the search committee for a Coordinator of Reformed University Ministries; chair of the General Assembly's Theological Examination Committee; member of the PCA's Strategic Planning Committee; moderator of the Presbytery of the Mississippi Valley (2001); moderator of the PCA General Assembly (2004), making him the youngest elected to this position in the denomination's history.

=== Other Organizations ===
He is the former president of the Alliance of Confessing Evangelicals, a broad coalition of evangelical Christians from various denominations. It aims to call the church to repent of what it see as its worldliness, and to take up the mantle of the Protestant reformers in recovering the centrality of worship and doctrine in the life of the church. In his capacity as president, Duncan regularly spoke at the Philadelphia Conference on Reformed Theology, an Alliance-related forum that offers quarterly conferences on Reformed doctrine and history. He also contributes to the Alliance's online magazine and blog, Reformation21.

He is also a council member of the Gospel Coalition, a "group of (mostly) pastors and churches in the Reformed heritage who delight in the truth and power of the gospel, and who want the gospel of Christ crucified and resurrected to lie at the center of all we cherish, preach, and teach." They have created The Gospel Coalition Network, which is a consortium of "Christian pastors and other leaders who stimulate one another to faithfulness and fruitfulness in life and ministry in this rapidly-changing, increasingly urbanized, and spiritually hungry world."

== Pastoral History ==
Ligon Duncan is the Chancellor/CEO of Reformed Theological Seminary and the John E. Richards Professor of Systematic and Historical Theology. Ligon was born in Greenville, SC, and reared in the home of an eighth generation Presbyterian ruling elder. A 1983 graduate of Furman University (B.A. History), he received the M.Div. and M.A. (Historical Theology) from Covenant Theological Seminary. He earned the Ph.D. from the University of Edinburgh, New College, Scotland, in 1995 (under the supervision of renowned Reformation and Patristics scholar, David F. Wright). While in Scotland he also studied Systematic Theology at the Free Church of Scotland College (now Edinburgh Theological Seminary) with Professor Donald Macleod.

Ligon's pastoral experience began in his twenties, while in seminary. At the age of 24, he was licensed to preach by Calvary Presbytery (PCA) and since then he has preached in Presbyterian, Dutch Reformed, Baptist, Congregational, Anglican, Methodist, and Independent churches (including PCA, ARP, EPC, OPC, RPCNA, PC(USA), ECO, CRC, RCA, URCNA congregations, churches affiliated with the Southern Baptist Convention as well as various Reformed Baptist and evangelical Anglican groups). While in Britain, Duncan supplied pulpits in Church of Scotland and Free Church of Scotland congregations, as well as Presbyterian Association of England churches (now called The Evangelical Presbyterian Church of England and Wales). His pastoral ministry now spans four decades and four congregations: The Covenant Presbyterian Church of St. Louis, Missouri; Trinity Presbyterian Church, Jackson, Miss.; First Presbyterian Church, Yazoo City, Miss.; and historic First Presbyterian Church, Jackson, Miss., where he served almost 18 years.

At 28, Ligon was elected to the faculty of Reformed Theological Seminary (RTS). In 1990, Duncan was ordained in the Presbyterian Church in America (PCA) and began to teach at RTS, Jackson, Miss., where he eventually became chairman of the department of systematic theology, and the John R. Richardson Professor of Theology. Over his thirty-plus years at RTS he has lectured regularly at all of the campuses of (especially Jackson, Charlotte, Orlando, Washington, and New York) and he has taught all of the core Systematic Theology courses, Pastoral/Social Ethics, Apologetics, History of Philosophy and Christian Thought, Covenant Theology, Patristics, Evangelism, Worship, Church History, Philosophical Theology, Scottish Theology, Contemporary Theology, and Theology of the Westminster Standards. He left his full-time position at RTS to become Senior Minister of the historic First Presbyterian Church (1837) in Jackson, Miss., in 1996 and served until 2013, while continuing to teach at RTS as adjunct. He returned to the regular faculty of RTS in 2012 and became Chancellor/CEO of RTS.

== Theological and Social Positions ==
In 2017, Duncan signed the Nashville Statement.

=== Gender Roles ===
Duncan holds to a complementarian view of gender roles. He believes that 1 Corinthians 14:34, which says 'women should keep silent in the churches', refers to women teaching men (like found in 1Timothy 2:12), This puts him at odds with the popular view espoused by Wayne Grudem and Don Carson who insist that the context shows that Paul is prohibiting women from publicly judging prophecy in the church. In the church he serves, men teach mixed adult Sunday school classes, occasionally husband/wife teams teach on issues such as parenting and marriage.

Duncan wrote the introduction to Dr. Eric Mason's book "Woke Church," which argues Christian churches should support Black Lives Matter and that the Nation of Islam promotes black pride.

== Publications ==
=== Authored/co-authored ===
- Does Grace Grow Best in Winter? (co-author with J. Nicholas Reid). P & R Publishing, 2009.
- Fear Not! (foreword by Jerry Bridges). Christian Focus, 2008.
- The Westminster Assembly: A Guide to Basic Bibliography (co-author with David W. Hall). Reformed Academic Press, 1993.
- A Short History of the Westminster Assembly(co-author/editor with William Beveridge). Reformed Academic Press, 1993.
- The Genesis Debate: Three Views of the Days of Creation (co-author with David W. Hall, Meredith Kline, Lee Irons, Hugh Ross, and Gleason Archer). Crux Press, 2000.
- Should We Leave Our Churches? (co-author with Mark Talbot). P&R, 2004.
- Women’s Ministry in the Local Church (co-author). Crossway, 2006.

=== Edited ===
- Matthew Henry’s Method for Prayer (editor). Christian Focus Publications/Christian Heritage, 1994.
- The Westminster Confession in the 21st Century: Essays in Remembrance of the 350th Anniversary of the Westminster Assembly, (general editor and contributor) Mentor, Vol. 1, 2003; Vol. 2, 2004; Vol. 3, 2008.
- Give Praise to God: A Vision for Reforming Worship, (editor and contributor) P&R, 2003.

=== Contributor ===
- The Practice of Confessional Subscription (contributor). University Press of America, 1995.
- Reclaiming the Gospel and Reforming Churches, (contributor) Founders Press, 2003.
- Letters to Timothy, (contributor) Founders Press, 2004.
- Confessing Our Hope, (contributor) GPTS Press, 2004.
- The Devoted Life: An Invitation to the Puritan Classics, (contributor) IVP, 2004.
- Preaching the Cross (contributor), Crossway, 2007.
- Fear Not: Death and the Afterlife from a Christian Perspective (contributor), Christian Focus, 2008.
- In My Place Condemned He Stood (contributor), Crossway, 2008.
