= Anthony B. Bradley =

American theologian and academic

- Education: Clemson University; Covenant Theological Seminary; Fordham University; John J. College of Criminal Justice; Westminster Theological Seminary
- Occupations: Theologian, author and cultural analyst
- Website: https://www.anthonybradleyphd.com/

Anthony B. Bradley is an American theologian, author and cultural analyst. The author of twelve books, including Aliens in the Promised Land, which launched a minority-led conversation about racism in the U.S. evangelical church, he has also published articles on religion, culture, and society in The Washington Examiner, The Philadelphia Inquirer, The Atlanta Journal-Constitution, The Detroit News, Al Jazeera, World Magazine, Christianity Today.

Bradley has been featured on C-SPAN, CNN/Headline News, Fox News, and NPR, commenting on issues surrounding fatherlessness, fraternity reform, criminal justice, education policy, poverty, race, and faith in public life.

== Education ==
Bradley has a Bachelor of Science in biological sciences from Clemson University, a Master of Divinity from Covenant Theological Seminary, a Master of Arts in Ethics and Society from Fordham University, a Master of Criminal Justice at John Jay College of Criminal Justice, and a PhD from Westminster Theological Seminary.

== Career ==
From 2005 to 2009, Bradley was an assistant professor of theology at the Covenant Theological Seminary, where he also directed the Francis A. Schaeffer Institute.

Bradley was professor of religion, theology and ethics at the King's College in New York City, and served as the chair of the King's College Religious and Theological Studies program and directed the Galsworthy Criminal Justice Reform Program.

Bradley works as a research fellow for The Acton Institute.

== Bibliography ==
- Liberating Black Theology: The Bible and the Black Experience in America. Wheaton, IL: Crossway Books, 2010. ISBN 978-1-4335-1147-9
- Black and Tired: Essays on Race, Politics, Culture, and International Development. Eugene, OR: Wipf & Stock, 2011. ISBN 978-1-60899-596-7; C-SPAN, Book TV
- The Political Economy of Liberation: Thomas Sowell and James Cone on the Black Experience. New York, NY: Peter Lang Inc, International Academic Publishers, 2012. ISBN 978-1433111839
- Keep Your Head Up: America's New Black Christian Leaders, Social Consciousness, and the Cosby Conversation. Wheaton, IL: Crossway, 2012. ISBN 978-1-4335-0673-4
- Aliens in the Promised Land: Why Minority Leadership is Overlooked in White Christian Churches. Phillipsburg, NJ: P & R, 2013. ISBN 978-1-5963-8234-3; Edited by Bradley who also wrote the first chapter.
- John Rawls and Christian Social Engagement: Justice as Unfairness. London: Lexington, 2014. ISBN 978-1-4985-0494-2
- Black Scholars in White Space: New Vistas in African American Studies from the Christian Academy. Cascade Books: Oregon, 2015. ISBN 978-1620329955
- Something Seems Strange: Critical Essays on Christianity, Public Policy, and Contemporary Culture. Wipf and Stock: Oregon, 2016. ISBN 978-1498283908
- Ending Overcriminalization and Mass Incarceration: Hope from Civil Society. Cambridge University Press: Cambridge, 2018. ISBN 978-1108446297
- Heroic Fraternities: How College Men Can Save Universities and America. New York, NY: Wipf and Stock, 2023. ISBN 978-1-6667-1553-8
- The Fatherhood Effect: Consequences of a Dad-Deprived Culture—and Practical Strategies for Positive Change. Ada, MI: Baker Books, 2026. ISBN 978-1-5409-0521-5
