= Mixed flowing gas testing =

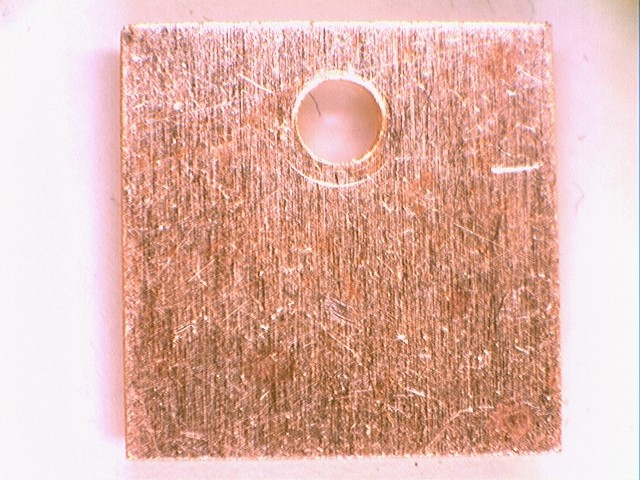
Nominally 1 cm square copper coupon prepared per ASTM B810-01a(2017) Cleaning Method I

Mixed flowing gas (MFG) is a type of laboratory environmental testing for products, particularly electronics, to evaluate resistance to corrosion due to gases in the atmosphere. Mixed Flowing Gas (MFG) test is a laboratory test in which the temperature (°C), relative humidity (%RH), concentration of gaseous pollutants (in parts per billion, ppb or parts per million ppm level), and other critical variables (such as volume exchange rate and airflow rate) are carefully defined, monitored and controlled. The purpose of this test is to simulate corrosion phenomenon due to atmospheric exposure. The electronic product is exposed to gases such as chlorine, hydrogen sulfide, nitrogen dioxide, and sulfur dioxide at levels in the parts per billion range, in a controlled environmental chamber. Test samples that have been exposed to MFG testing have ranged from bare metal surfaces, to electrical connectors, and to complete assemblies. In regards to noble metal plated connector applications, MFG testing has been widely accepted as a qualification test method to evaluate the performance of these connectors.

MFG testing was primarily developed by William H. Abbott at Batelle in the 1980s. Much of the work was described in a series of “… Progress Report[s] on Studies of Natural and Laboratory Environmental Reactions on Materials and Components,” by Abbott, issued in 1981, ‘83, ‘84 and ‘86. Abbott published two papers on MFG testing in IEEE Transactions in 1988 and 1990. Other research has evaluated MFG testing.

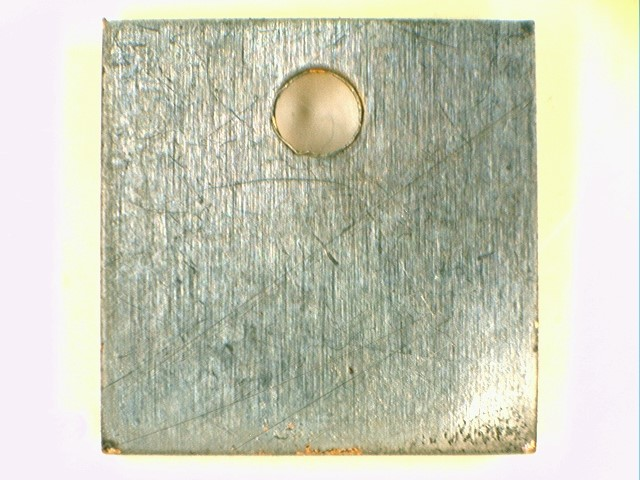
Cleaned copper coupon exposed for five days at 40 ± 2 °C and 75 ± 2 % R.H and 30 ± 5 PPB Chlorine, 200 ± 25 PPB Nitrogen dioxide, 200 ± 20 PPB Hydrogen sulfide and 200 ± 50 PPB Sulfur dioxide

While standard practice MFG testing requires careful definition, monitoring and control of temperature, humidity, gaseous pollutant concentrations, volume exchange rate and airflow rate, there is considerable potential for variations in mass flow, environmental mixing and gradients in the chambers used. The only realistic benchmark for MFG testing is the use of metal reference coupons. Copper is the most commonly used material. Silver has also been used. Copper weight-gain rates are typically four times that observed for silver. Coupons are typically hung in the test chamber located in proximity to the materials under test.

Metal coupons should ideally have large surface area and small edge thickness. Coupons are prepared per ASTM B810-01a. Coupons are weighed before and after exposure. The surface deposits are assumed to be copper (I) sulfide, Cu_{2}S, in the case of copper coupons and silver sulfide, Ag_{2}S, for silver. The weight change for both metals is assumed to be due strictly to the addition of sulfur. The deposit thickness is determined by multiplying the coupon weight change by the formula weight for the metal sulfide divided by the density of the metal sulfide times the atomic weight of sulfur times the total surface area for the two faces of the coupon (minus any drill hole for hanging).

$Thickness (cm) = {Weight change (g)\times F.W. (M_2S)(g/mol) \over \rho (M_2S)(g/cm^3) \times A_{r,standard}(S)(g/mol)\times Area(cm^2)}$

Where F.W. = formula weight, ρ = density and A_{r,standard} is the standard, relative atomic weight. Thicknesses are typically converted from centimeters to Angstrom units.

Common practice is to report the calculated copper and silver corrosion levels per ISA 71.04 [see Specification, below] reactive environment exposure severity levels. The levels are “G1” (mild), “G2” (moderate) and “G3” (harsh), reported as equivalent months or years. For equivalent months, for copper, the thickness of the deposits in Angstrom units is divided by 300 for G1, 1000 for G2 and 2000 for G3. For silver, the thickness in Angstrom units is divided by 200, 1000 and 2000, respectively. For equivalent years, the exposures in months are further divided by 12.

== Industry specifications ==
1. ASTM B827-05(2014) [Replaces ASTM B827-97]—Standard Practice for Conducting Mixed Flowing Gas Environmental Tests
2. ASTM B845-97(2018) [Replaces ASTM B845-97]—Standard Guide for Mixed Flowing Gas Tests for Electrical Contacts
3. ASTM B810-01a(2017) [Replaces ASTM B810-01a]—Standard Method for Calibration of Atmospheric Corrosion Test Chambers by Change in Mass of Copper Coupons
4. ASTM B825-97(WITHDRAWN, NO REPLACEMENT)—Standard Test Method for Coulometric Reduction of Surface Films on Metallic Test Samples
5. ASTM B826-09(2015) [Replaces ASTM B826-97]—Standard Test Method for Monitoring Corrosion Tests by Electrical Resistance Probes
6. ASTM B808-10(2015) [Replaces ASTM B808-97]—Standard Test Method for Monitoring of Atmospheric Corrosion Chambers by Quartz Crystal Microbalances
7. EIA 364, Test Procedure 65A
8. IEC 60068-2-60:2015 RLV
9. IEC 512-11-7
10. ISA 71.04-2013—Environmental Conditions for Process Measurement & Control Systems: Airborne Contaminants
