= Sarang Community Church of Southern California =

Coordinates: 33.848°N 117.961°W

- Sarang Community Church of Southern California
- Location: Orange County, California, United States
- Denomination: Presbyterian Church in America
- Churchmanship: Evangelical

History
- Founded: 1988
- Founder: Rev. Jung-hyun Oh

- Sarang Community Church of Southern California
- Hangul: 남가주사랑의교회
- Revised Romanization: Namgajusaranguigyohoe
- McCune–Reischauer: Sarang'ŭikyohoe

Sarang Community Church of Southern California is a Presbyterian Church in America (PCA) Korean-American church located in Anaheim, California. Sarang has more than 10,000 church attenders. Some statistics estimate about 11,000 attenders. It is the largest Korean church outside of Korea, as well as the largest Asian church outside Asia. In addition, Sarang is the largest congregation within the Presbyterian Church in America. Sarang (사랑) is Korean for "love".

Sa-Rang Community Church was founded in 1988 by Rev. Oh Jung-hyun.

In 2003 Pastor Oh moved to a megachurch in Seoul, Korea, of the same name, Sarang Community Church. In 2004, Rev. SeungWook Kim (Daniel Kim) moved from Korean United Church, (PCA) and installed as the new pastor.

In 2011, Pastor Kim moved to a church in Korea called Hallelujah Community Church. In 2012, Rev. ChangSoo Roh came from Korean Central Presbyterian Church (PCA) and became the new pastor.
