= Inter-Collegiate Prayer Fellowship =

Intercollegiate Prayer Fellowship
- Abbreviation: ICPF
- Founded: 1980
- Founder: Prof. Mathew P. Thomas
- Type: Christian student fellowship
- Purpose: College and university campuses
- Origins: Kerala, India
- Motto: Impacting the new generation
- President: Dr. K. Muralidar
- Religious affiliations: Evangelical
- Website: https://www.icpfglobal.com

Inter-Collegiate Prayer Fellowship (ICPF) is the largest indigenous evangelical Christian campus ministry in India. It was founded in Kerala in 1980. It operates through student-led campus prayer cells and regional structures, focusing on evangelism, leadership training, discipleship, and social awareness.

== History ==
ICPF originated from evangelical student gospel camps held at Charalkunnu, Kerala, beginning in the early 1970s under the leadership of Prof. Mathew P. Thomas. It was formally founded in 1980 to organize widespread campus ministry efforts. Dr. K. Muralidar is the president of the organisation and has led the ministry for many decades. During his college days, Christian missionary Saju John Mathew spearheaded the movement to new heights and Stanley George started the chapter in Bangalore.

Initially staffed by volunteers, ICPF expanded to multiple Indian states, Karnataka, Maharashtra, Punjab, Gujarat, Delhi, West Bengal, Orissa, Madhya Pradesh, Andhra Pradesh, and Tamil Nadu with more than 80 staff workers and over 500 campus units established by the early 2000s.

The ministry emphasizes interdenominational fellowship by bridging church divisions for shared Gospel outreach and relies on prayer and voluntary contributions for operations.

== Activities and Outreach ==
ICPF conducts campus prayer meetings, Bible study groups, awareness programs addressing issues such as substance abuse, and larger youth camps and retreats. It also provides financial assistance through Educational and Marriage Funds and operates mobile healthcare units serving rural communities. ICPF launched mobile outreach teams—named ANGELOS I (1980) and ANGELOS II (1996)—equipped with sound systems and musical instruments to carry the Gospel to college campuses and street gatherings across India.

== Organization ==
ICPF is organised as a registered society, guided by an executive committee under the leadership of founding visionary Prof. Mathew P. Thomas, with Dr. K. Muraleedhar serving as president and other appointed national leaders. Its structure includes graduate-based prayer support chapters across India and abroad.

== See also ==
- Campus ministry
