= Bryan Chapell =

American pastor and theologian

The Reverend Dr. Bryan Chapell
- Born: 18 November 1954 (age 71)
- Education: Northwestern University (B.J.); Covenant Theological Seminary (MDiv); Southern Illinois University Carbondale (Ph.D.)
- Occupations: Pastor, Author
- Spouse: Kathy Chapell

Bryan Chapell (born 18 November 1954) is an American pastor and theologian who served as the Stated Clerk of the Presbyterian Church in America until 2025. He was previously the senior pastor of Grace Presbyterian Church in Peoria, Illinois. Prior to that he was president and chancellor of Covenant Theological Seminary in St. Louis, Missouri for twenty years. Chapell is also an author, lecturer, and conference speaker specializing in homiletics. He served as Moderator of the Presbyterian Church in America in 2014.

== Family ==
Chapell married Kathleen Beth Gabriel on May 27, 1978. The two have four adult children and a growing number of grandchildren.

== Education ==
Chapell has a Bachelor of Journalism from Northwestern University, a Master of Divinity from Covenant Theological Seminary, and a PhD in speech communication from Southern Illinois University Carbondale.

== Ministry ==
Chapell began pastoral ministry at Woodburn Presbyterian Church in Woodburn, Illinois in 1976 and subsequently pastored Bethel Reformed Presbyterian Church (Reformed Presbyterian Church, Evangelical Synod) in Sparta, Illinois from 1978 to 1985. He became a professor of preaching at Covenant Theological Seminary (national seminary of the Presbyterian Church in America) in 1985, where he also served as Dean of Faculty and Executive Vice-president (1987–1994), and 20 years as President and, then, Chancellor (1994–2013). He was designated President Emeritus of Covenant Seminary in 2013. On Easter, 2013, he became Senior Pastor of the historic Grace Presbyterian Church (PCA) in Peoria, Illinois and ministered in that capacity until 2020, when he was made Pastor Emeritus. In 2020, Chapell was appointed Stated Clerk Pro Tempore of the PCA and in 2021 was elected as the Stated Clerk (i.e., Chief Administrative Officer), a position he continues to hold.

Within the Presbyterian Church in America, Chapell has served as: Moderator, Church Planting Chairman, and Candidates and Credentials Committee Chairman of the Illiana Presbytery; a member of the National Committee on Ordination Curriculum and Internship Standards for the General Assembly; Mission to North America's Candidate Assessment Committee; multiple judiciary panels of the General Assembly; the Committee on Constitutional Business (multiple terms); the Cooperative Ministries Committee; the Steering Committee for Worship Practices of PCA Church Plants; the Overtures Committee of the General Assembly (serving multiple terms and as Chairman in 2016); the Strategic Planning Committee (2000-2006 and 2008-2013, serving as Chairman); the Standing Judicial Commission (multiple terms); the Revision Committee of the Rules of Assembly Operations; and, the Steering Committee of the Presbyterian Pastors Leadership Network. Chapell was elected Moderator of the General Assembly in 2014, and has been asked to be a special session speaker for the General Assembly more than a dozen times. He has also served as interim Pastor at multiple churches in their times of transition.

== Unlimited Grace ==
In 2015, Chapell and members from Grace Presbyterian Church founded Unlimited Grace Media, an independent non-profit media ministry dedicated to spreading the gospel of God's grace to all people. Chapell now hosts a daily half-hour radio Bible teaching program called "Unlimited Grace," which began airing in 2016 both nationally and internationally. The broadcasts are also available at Unlimitedgrace.com and on multiple internet platforms such as Oneplace.com, YouTube, Vimeo, Spotify, Facebook, and Apple podcasts.

In addition to daily, national broadcasts, Unlimited Grace conducts ministry through three websites: 1) Unlimitedgrace.com for those seeking resources from the Unlimited Grace broadcast ministry that daily airs on the Salem Radio Network in major American cities; Christcenteredpreaching.com, making available seminary-level preaching courses for pastors and those in pastoral training around the world (in multiple languages) with an emphasis on preparing expository messages true to the redemptive message pervading all Scripture; and, Bryanchapell.com, providing a free, comprehensive archive of Bryan Chapell’s sermons, interviews, teachings, and writings.

== Homiletics ==
Chapell's book Christ-Centered Preaching: Redeeming the Expository Sermon is considered his magnum opus. It won Preaching magazine's Book of the Year award in 1994 and has been considered a seminal work in the movement to make the redemptive message of Scripture integral to expository preaching. Now in its third decade and third edition, Christ-centered Preaching remains widely used and is available worldwide in more than two dozen languages.

In this now-standard homiletics text, Chapell explains how the grace of God that culminates in the ministry of Jesus Christ pervades all of Scripture. Chapell helps preachers see this grace by showing how individual, biblical texts invariably have a "Fallen Condition Focus" (FCF): "the mutual human condition that contemporary believers share with those for or by whom the text was written that requires the grace of the passage to manifest God's glory in his people." Identifying the FCF enables the preacher proclaim how God is providing solution to some aspect of humanity's fallen condition that we cannot provide for ourselves. This aspect of grace will come to greatest manifestation in the ministry of Jesus. His coming was predicted after humanity's fall at Scripture's opening (Genesis 3:15) and the necessity of his ministry is the context of all Scripture's content. Thus, all Scripture is shown to be pointing away from human solutions and toward the divine redemption that is centered in Christ. Chapell's approach is to raise the FCF in the sermon's introduction so that the body of the sermon shows how God is addressing the FCF, making plain its redemptive purpose. Zack Eswine suggests that the FCF "helpfully urges the preachers to account for Christians in a fallen world," but that it is "equipped primarily as a tool for churched contexts."

== Writings ==
Chapell has written several other books, including:

- "Unlimited Grace"
- "Christ-Centered Worship"
- "The Gospel According to Daniel"
- "Standing Your Ground"
- "The Promises of Grace"
- "Using Illustrations to Preach with Power"
- "Each for the Other"
- "Commentary on Ephesians"
- "The Wonder of It All"
- "1 & 2 Timothy and Titus: To Guard the Deposit (with R. Kent Hughes)"
- "Holiness by Grace"
- "Praying Backwards: Transform Your Prayer Life by Beginning in Jesus' Name"
- "The Hardest Sermons You'll Ever Have to Preach"
- "I'll Love You Anyway and Always, a children's book"
- "Daily Grace: 365 Daily Devotions Reflecting God's Unlimited Grace"
- "Grace At Work: Redeeming the Grind and the Glory of Your Job"
- “Each for the Other” with Kathy Chapell
- “Any and Always” with Kathy Chapell
- “The Multigenerational Church Crisis: Why We Don’t Understand Each Other and How to Unite in Mission” (2025)

He has also contributed to more than 50 other books and written many academic and devotional articles as well as lyrics to several hymns.

== Religious service ==
Chapell has served the larger church in numerous roles of pastoral, mission, and academic leadership including: long-term membership in the Evangelical Theological Society and Evangelical Homiletics Society; Steering Committee of St. Louis Billy Graham Crusade; Board of Directors of Cass Information Systems; Contributing Editor of Preaching Today; Contributing Editor of Reformation and Revival journal; Contributing Editor of Preaching magazine; Board of World Magazine; Board of byFaith Magazine; Board of Reference for Stephen Olford Ministries International; Board of Reference of Calvin 500 in Geneva, Switzerland; Board of Advisors of New England Theological Seminary; Board of Advisors of Life and Word magazine of The Society for Reformed Life Theology; Founding Council and Governance Committee of The Gospel Coalition; President of the Fellowship of Evangelical Seminary Presidents; Interim President of Christ College, Taiwan; International Council of Reference for Lausanne III of the Lausanne Committee for World Evangelization; Standards Revision Committee for the Association of Theological Schools in North America; Planning Committee of the Lausanne Consultation on Global Theological Education; Host Committee for Lausanne Global Leaders’ Summit; International Training Leader for Bible Study Fellowship; Board of Directors of Serge International; Board of Advisors for Inspiro Internet Ministries; Board of Directors of the National Association of Evangelicals; President and Chairman of the Board of Unlimited Grace Ministries.

In November 2009, Chapell signed an ecumenical statement known as the Manhattan Declaration: A Call of Christian Conscience calling on evangelicals, Catholics and Orthodox to support the constitutional right to address issues that go against religious conscience such as human trafficking, abortion, same-sex marriage, etc.

In his roles as a preacher, teacher, and author, Bryan Chapell has preached and lectured in seminaries, universities, churches, and conferences in many nations. He is currently Distinguished Professor of Preaching at Knox Theological Seminary and Distinguished Professor of Preaching at Gordon-Conwell Theological Seminary. In addition, he has served multiple terms as Adjunct Professor of Preaching at Covenant Theological Seminary, Reformed Theological Seminary, Western Theological Seminary, Trinity Evangelical Divinity School, Heritage Theological Seminary; and, Christ College, Australia. He has provided individual lectureships in scores of additional theological institutions and preached sermons in hundreds of churches across the world. In 2023, Chapell preached at the Hong Kong Bible Conference to an audience of over 1.1 million Chinese people.

In May 2025, during an appearance on The Gospel Coalition's Gospelbound podcast, Chapell displayed a note containing names of people he described as church "scandalizers" and said that every person on the list had "either left his family, left the faith or taken his life". After screenshots of the list circulated, Chapell apologized in byFaith, calling his response "not appropriate or true" and saying it brought "unwarranted disrepute" on people identified. The PCA Administrative Committee later approved Chapell's request to retire, effective immediately, and said it had received his repentance and apology while recognizing the seriousness of the situation.

Academic offices
Preceded by Paul Kooistra	President and Chancellor of Covenant Theological Seminary; 1994–2013	Succeeded by Mark Dalbey
