= Robert G. Rayburn =

American pastor and college president (1915–1990)

- Born: January 14, 1915; Newton, Kansas, US
- Died: January 5, 1990 (aged 74)
- Children: 4, including Robert S. Rayburn & Bentley Rayburn
- Parent(s): James Chalmers Rayburn, Sr.
- Relatives: Jim Rayburn (brother)

Robert Gibson Rayburn (January 14, 1915 – January 5, 1990) was an American pastor and college president.

== Personal life ==
Rayburn was born in Newton, Kansas, to James Chalmers Rayburn, Sr. (an evangelist for the Presbyterian Church), and Elna Beck Rayburn. Robert was one of four sons. His oldest brother, James, also a Presbyterian minister, would go on to found the Christian organization Young Life in 1941.

Rayburn studied at Wheaton College, Omaha Presbyterian Theological Seminary, and Dallas Theological Seminary. He served as a chaplain in the U.S. Army from 1944 to 1946, and again from 1950 to 1952, during the Korean War. Between these two terms of service, he was pastor of College Church in Wheaton, Illinois.

== Ministry ==
Rayburn served as president of Highland College in Pasadena, California from 1952 to 1956. In 1956, he joined with the Evangelical Presbyterian Church in parting ways with Carl McIntire's Bible Presbyterian Church. He became the founding president of Covenant College, which belonged to the new denomination, and then founding president of Covenant Theological Seminary. He relinquished the presidency of the college in 1965 after it relocated from St. Louis, Missouri to Lookout Mountain, Georgia, but remained president of the seminary until 1977. He died of cancer in 1990.

Rayburn wrote O Come Let Us Worship in 1980, in which he "sought to reintroduce evangelicalism to its history and liturgy." According to Bryan Chapell, Rayburn "became the vanguard" of "modern integrative liturgies", anticipating the work of Robert E. Webber, Thomas C. Oden, and Hughes Oliphant Old.

The chapel on the campus of Covenant Theological Seminary in St. Louis is named in honor of its founding president.

Rayburn College, in Manipur, India, is named after him.

Rayburn had four children, including Robert S. Rayburn and Bentley Rayburn.

Academic offices
Preceded by New Office	President of Highland College; 1952–1955	Succeeded by Lynn Gray Gordon
Preceded by New Office	President of Covenant College; 1955–1965	Succeeded by Marion Barnes
Preceded by New Office	President of Covenant Theological Seminary; 1956–1977	Succeeded by William S. Barker
