= Korean Central Presbyterian Church =

Korean Central Presbyterian Church (KCPC)
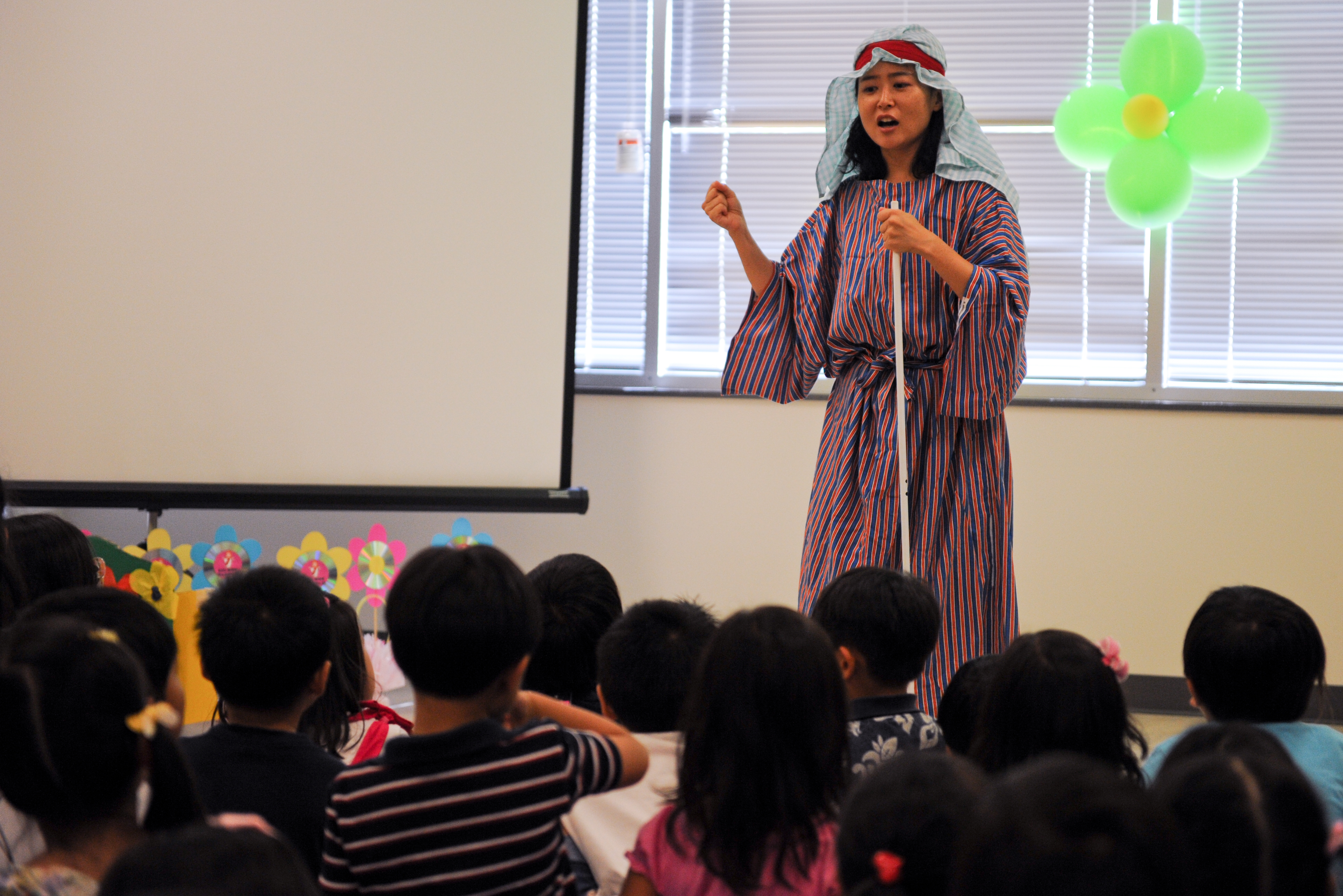
- A Sunday school class at Korean Central Presbyterian Church
- Korean Central Presbyterian Church (KCPC)
- 38.829337°N 77.480295°W
- Location: 15451 Lee Highway, Centreville, Virginia 20121, U.S.
- Country: United States
- Denomination: Presbyterian Church in America
- Website: www.kcpc.org; English Congregation ec.kcpc.org; DC Campus dc.kcpc.org

History
- Founded: 1973
- Founder: Myung Ho Yoon

Architecture
- Style: modern

Clergy
- Pastor: KCPC pastor - Rev. Eung-yul David Ryoo

Korean Central Presbyterian Church (KCPC; Korean: 와싱톤중앙장로교회) is a Christian church located in Centreville, Virginia, situated in the Washington D.C. in the US. Korean Central Presbyterian Church is the largest member congregation of the Presbyterian Church in America. Korean Central Presbyterian Church has about 5,400 members and about equal number of non-communicants who call the church home; its services average 4,600 attendees per week. As of 2025, the Senior Pastor is Eung-yul David Ryoo.

== History ==
The Korean Central Presbyterian Church was founded on November 4, 1973, by Rev. Myung Ho Yoon with 20 Korean American families. The first service was in his residence at 313 Park Street, N.E., in Vienna, Virginia.

Four years later, Rev. Won Sang Lee became senior pastor; he and served for 26 years. By 2003, the congregation grew to over 3,700 members. The English-speaking congregation (Korean Central Presbyterian Church English Ministry) began in the early 1990s to minister to the American-born or raised members of the church. To accommodate the growing size of the congregation Korean Central Presbyterian Church moved from the previous 12-acre Vienna campus to a new 80-acre campus at Centreville on July 11, 2010.

The third senior pastor was Rev. Danny C. Ro, who served from October 2003 until July 1, 2012, when he left to become the senior pastor of Sarang Community Church of Southern California.

Rev. Eung-yul David Ryoo was installed in 2013 as the church's fourth pastor. The church's English-speaking congregation, having joined the Korean Capital Presbytery, changed its name to Christ Central Presbyterian Church (CCPC). In 2019, Korean Central Presbyterian Church launched a 10 a.m. worship service for its English-speaking congregation (Korean Central Presbyterian Church EC). An English Congregation Support Committee (ECSC) was launched in 2020 to systematically pursue Korean Central Presbyterian Church's vision of unity and diversity between the English- and Korean-speaking congregants under a "one church" model.

On January 10, 2021, Korean Central Presbyterian Church launched its KCPC-DC Campus in Arlington, Virginia.

== Ministries ==
The congregation has several ministries including youth, health, and security.

== Community service ==
In the past, KCPC has supported the community by;

- Supporting Fairfax County government by providing use of their buildings for the Providence District staff meetings and the Long Term Care Council monthly meetings.
- Providing a Personal Care Aids Program in Fairfax, Virginia.
- Providing voter registration campaigns.
- Participating in the Senior Navigator Korean project which provides translation of information into Korean for the local Korean community.

== See also ==
- Koreans in Washington, DC
