= Robert S. Rayburn =

American pastor and theologian (born 1950)

Robert S. Rayburn (born August 8, 1950) is an American pastor and theologian. He was the pastor of Faith Presbyterian Church, a PCA church in Tacoma, Washington, and served as the stated clerk of the Presbytery of the Pacific Northwest. Rayburn studied at Covenant College, Covenant Theological Seminary, and the University of Aberdeen.

Rayburn has been described as "the modern patriarch of covenant succession thinking," for his essay "The Presbyterian Doctrines of Covenant Children, Covenant Nurture and Covenant Succession". He was also the author of the PCA minority report in favor of paedocommunion.

He is the son of Robert G. Rayburn, the founder of Covenant College and Covenant Theological Seminary.
