= The Sulphur Institute =

Non-profit organization

The Sulphur Institute logo

The Sulphur Institute, or TSI (also spelled The Sulfur Institute), is an international non-profit organization which acts as a global advocate for sulfur and sulfur producers.

== History ==
The Sulphur institute was founded in 1960, initially working with companies involved in the mining of sulfur using the Frasch process. With the increase of the Claus process for extracting sulfur from natural gas and oil, TSI's members now include multinational energy companies. The Sulphur Institute connects these sulfur producers with sulfur's largest consumer markets (fertilizers and construction materials), transporters, traders, and service providers. Today, The Sulphur Institute's member companies include a host of companies from five continents involved with producing, consuming, trading, adding value, or supplying services to the sulfur industry.

== Programs and Activities ==
TSI is actively engaged in event planning and publishing print materials for the benefit of all sulfur stakeholders. Their work includes international meetings, and developing field activities in regions where sulfur has an economically beneficial role. TSI provides individuals with access to sulfur related publications. In addition to these meetings and printed works, TSI has programs in four main aspects of the sulfur industry: Environment, Health, and Safety; Information and Advocacy; Sulphuric Acid; and Transportation Regulations and Logistics.

=== Environment, Health, and Safety program ===
TSI's Environment, Health, and Safety program addresses environmental and safety issues surrounding the transportation, production, and storage of sulfur. The Sulphur Institute's program allows regulatory agencies and industry stakeholders to connect, exchange knowledge, and develop practices which improve the safety of the industry.

=== Information and Advocacy program ===
The Sulphur Institute provides members, government and non-government agencies, and industry stakeholders accurate information on sulfur. TSI has served as a source of industry information for many publications including the Wall Street Journal. TSI is often quoted by publications within the industry as well. The information gathered by TSI is made available through a number of publications, webinars, and speaking engagements.

=== Sulphur Advocacy program ===
The Sulphur Advocacy program encourages the use of sulfur worldwide in many applications, to promote sulfur as a valuable fertilizer. "Through advocacy, education, and promotion, the program seeks to facilitate increased sulfur demand by removing hurdles for private industry to develop commercial scale sulfur-based fertilizer businesses."

TSI has worked in China and India to develop and promote the use of sulfur. China is one of the major consumers of sulfur, mainly because of its phosphate fertilizer industry. TSI began encouraging sulfur market growth in China beginning in 1994 and has continued working with Chinese organizations. In the 1984 The Sulphur Institute began working with representatives in India to encourage similar growth in sulfur usage. TSI worked with the International Fertilizer Industry Association and the Fertilizer Association of India to provide activities and resources on the use of sulfur in agriculture.

=== Transportation Regulations and Logistics program ===
TSI serves as a spokesperson for the sulfur industry with its Transportation Regulations and Logistics program. "TSI monitors for proposed changes to regulations impacting transportation and handling of sulfur and sulfur compounds." Their program covers transportation by rail, road, and sea transportation on regional, national, and international levels.

== Sulphur World Symposium ==
The Sulphur Institute holds an international symposium annually titled The Sulphur Institute's Sulphur World Symposium. The symposia are attended by producers, consumers, and traders in sulfur, as well as industry service providers, and feature speakers discussing a range of topics relating to sulfur.

The 2010 Sulphur World Symposium was held in Doha, Qatar from April 12 through April 15, 2010. The 2010 symposium featured a tour of the Ras Laffan Industrial City, which is not normally available to the public.

== Publications ==
Publications by The Sulphur Institute include market studies, industrial publications, general brochures about sulfur, and brochures on the agricultural uses of sulfur. Symposium proceedings are also available. Most publications are available in English, with several available in Spanish, Chinese, and Hindi.
