= Reformed University Fellowship =

Campus ministry organization

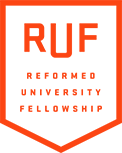
Reformed University Fellowship logo

Reformed University Fellowship (RUF) is the campus ministry organization of the Presbyterian Church in America (PCA). RUF has experienced rapid growth since the 1990s; its income in 1995 was $200,000 and grew to $24 million by 2012. RUF began on college campuses in the southern United States but expanded throughout the country, with campus ministries from Hawaii to Massachusetts. Currently, RUF has more than 170 ministries at different college campuses spread across 41 states in the US and throughout the world. The PCA follows traditional Westminster standards, including belief in the inerrancy and infallibility of the Bible.

== Purpose ==
RUF is not intended to be a substitute for formal church. It is open for anyone to join and is not exclusive to those within a certain denomination. However, the organization itself is closely associated with the Calvinist theological viewpoint, as their name implies. Its meetings range in size from campus to campus. There are also different types of meetings, often referred to as 'Large Group' or 'small groups'.

RUF hosts its main conference, Summer Conference (popularly known as SuCo), for students during three weeks in the summer at Laguna Beach, Florida. There are also regional conferences that take place throughout the year. The conferences, like the organization meetings, are not limited to those ascribing to Calvinist theology.

== History ==
The first RUF was started by Mark Lowrey in 1973 at the University of Southern Mississippi. The mission, vision, and guiding principles of RUF were approved by the PCA in 1979, and Lowrey became the first National Coordinator in 1982.

RUF grew significantly in the early 21st century. It went from 35 campuses in 1998 to over 100 in 2012 to 175 in 2023. Its revenue was $200,000 in 1995, but $24 million in 2012.

As of 2021, RUF has 170 campus ministers, 49 campus staff, and 176 interns.

== Other similar movements ==
The Reformed Youth Movement, while a ministry similar to RUF, is not officially a part of the PCA.
