= Covenant Theological Seminary =

Seminary of the Presbyterian Church in America

Coordinates: 38.6437°N 90.4521°W

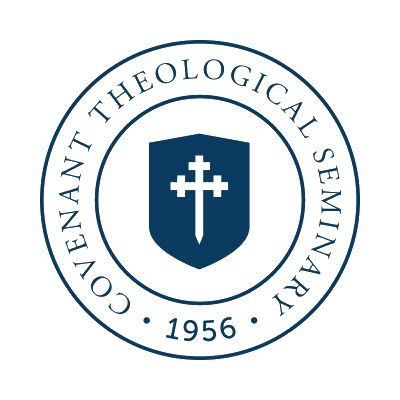
- Motto: Rooted in grace for a lifetime of ministry
- Type: Private seminary
- Established: 1956; 70 years ago
- Accreditation: Higher Learning Commission, Association of Theological Schools in the United States and Canada
- Religious affiliation: Presbyterian Church in America
- President: Thomas C. Gibbs
- Students: 300 FTE (2025)
- Location: Creve Coeur, Missouri, United States
- Campus: Suburban
- Website: covenantseminary.edu

Covenant Theological Seminary, informally called Covenant Seminary, is the denominational seminary of the Presbyterian Church in America (PCA). Located in Creve Coeur, Missouri, it trains people to work as leaders in church positions and elsewhere, especially as pastors, missionaries, and counselors. It does not require all students to be members of the PCA, but it is bound to promote the teachings of its denomination. Faculty must subscribe to the system of biblical doctrine outlined in the Westminster Standards.

== History ==
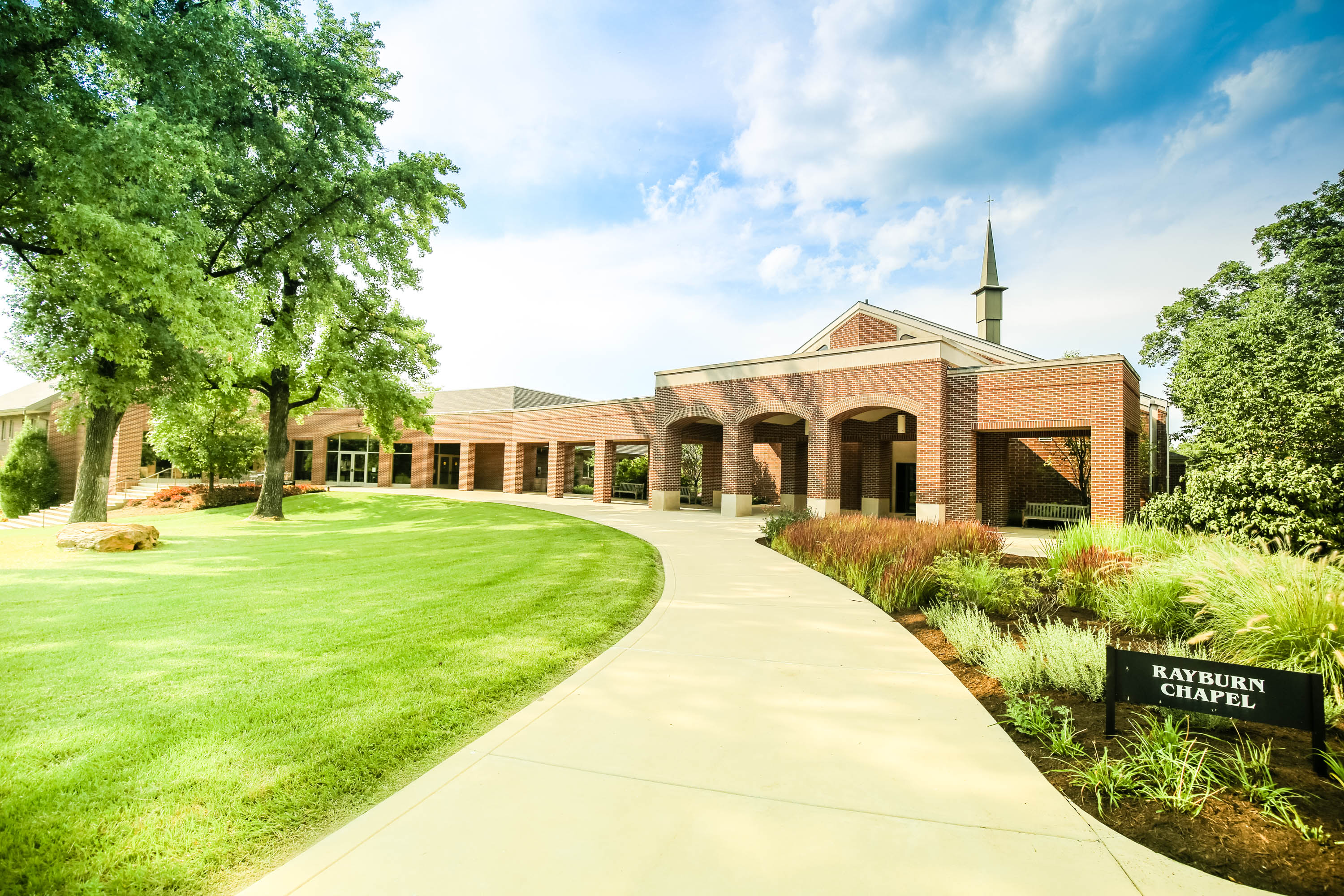
Covenant Theological Seminary

The seminary was established in 1956 as a sister institution to Covenant College, founded the previous year in Pasadena, California. Both were agencies of the Bible Presbyterian Church (Columbus Synod). The institution's founders believed that their denomination needed a strong theological school to resist liberalizing influences in American Evangelicalism. The college and seminary shared the president and campus in St. Louis until the college outgrew its space and moved to Lookout Mountain, Georgia, in 1964. They formally became two separate institutions in 1966.

Denominational mergers over the ensuing decades made the schools part of the Evangelical Presbyterian Church (EPC), then the Reformed Presbyterian Church, Evangelical Synod (RPCES), and finally, in 1982—through what is known as the "joining and receiving" with the RPCES—the Presbyterian Church in America (PCA), which elects and oversees the work of the seminary's board of trustees.

On March 26, 1990, Covenant Theological Seminary student Elizabeth Mackintosh was murdered on the Seminary's campus. The murder remains unsolved.

Over its 65 years, the seminary has continued to grow in size and reputation, and is now home to a student body (both on campus and online) drawn from nearly every U.S. state and many other nations. More than 4,500 Covenant Seminary graduates now serve as pastors, church planters, missionaries, campus ministers, counselors, Bible translators, and educators, and in many other ministry and non-vocational ministry capacities in multiple denominations and in all 50 states and 100 countries.

== Academics ==
The seminary is accredited by the Higher Learning Commission and Association of Theological Schools in the United States and Canada. It offers several academic degrees, including the Master of Divinity (MDiv), Master of Arts (MA), Master of Theology (ThM), and Doctor of Ministry (DMin).

The seminary is doctrinally committed to the Reformed faith and Covenant theology, and it believes the Bible to be the inspired and inerrant word of God.

The seminary is also home to the Francis Schaeffer Institute, which encourages Christians to engage contemporary culture in a compassionate way with the truth-claims of the gospel.

Covenant publishes Covenant magazine annually and Presbyterion, an academic theological journal, semiannually.

== President ==
In July 2021, Thomas C. Gibbs became the sixth president of Covenant Seminary, After graduating from Auburn University, Gibbs served as a youth director at Faith Presbyterian Church in Birmingham, Alabama. After earning a Master of Divinity degree from Covenant Seminary in 1997, he started a new Reformed University Fellowship (RUF) chapter at Baylor University, then served as senior pastor at Redeemer Presbyterian Church of San Antonio, Texas, for 19 years.

Previous Covenant presidents include: Robert G. Rayburn (1956–1977), William S. Barker (1977–1985), Paul Kooistra (1985–1994), Bryan Chapell (1994–2010; chancellor, 2011–2012), and Mark Dalbey (interim president, 2012–2013, permanent, 2013–2021).

== Notable alumni ==
- Kenneth Bae, US missionary, author, activist
- William S. Barker, theologian, educator
- Anthony Bradley, theologian, educator, author
- Bryan Chapell, theologian, educator, pastor
- Ligon Duncan, pastor
- Taek Kwon Lim, Former President of ACTS University in Korea.
- Matt Morginsky, Christian singer
- Nancy Pearcey, Christian author
- Bong Rin Ro, missiologist, former executive secretary of Asia Graduate School of Theology
- Phillip Sandifer, singer/songwriter
- Gavin Ortlund, theologian, author, apologist
