= Will Graham (evangelist) =

American Christian evangelist (born 1975)

- Born: William Franklin Graham IV; January 30, 1975 (age 51); Longmont, Colorado, U.S.
- Education: Liberty University; Southeastern Baptist Theological Seminary
- Occupation: Evangelist
- Spouse: Kendra Graham
- Children: 3
- Parent(s): Franklin Graham; Jane Cunningham
- Relatives: Billy Graham (grandfather), Ruth Graham (grandmother), L. Nelson Bell (great-grandfather), Gigi Graham (aunt), Anne Graham Lotz (aunt)

William Franklin Graham IV (born January 30, 1975) is an American Christian evangelist. He is the Executive Vice President and associate evangelist of the Billy Graham Evangelistic Association. Graham is the third generation of Grahams to preach under the banner of the Billy Graham Evangelistic Association (BGEA). He is a grandson of Billy Graham and the oldest son of Franklin Graham.

== Early years ==
The oldest of the four children of evangelist Franklin Graham and wife Jane Graham, Will Graham grew up in a farm house in the mountains of Boone, North Carolina, along with his two brothers and one sister.

He was introduced to Christianity by his father.

He graduated from Liberty University in 1997 with a bachelor's degree in religion and in 2001 graduated from Southeastern Baptist Theological Seminary with a master of divinity degree.

== Ministry ==
Since beginning his evangelistic ministry with youth-oriented, one-day events in Canada, Graham has spoken to audiences across North and South America, Australia, India, and other parts of Asia.

Graham's first crusade-style event took place in 2006 in Leduc, Alberta. His first celebration on U.S. soil came later that year in Gastonia, North Carolina. Since then, he has held evangelistic outreaches in Australia, Canada, England, Tanzania, India, Romania, the Philippines, Thailand, Japan, Scotland, Sri Lanka, Uganda, Papua New Guinea, Kenya, Mexico and many American states.

Graham also served BGEA as executive director of the Billy Graham Training Center at The Cove in Asheville, North Carolina until 2022. The Cove offers multi-day seminars and one-day events on a variety of Christian subjects and features nationally-recognized speakers.

In 2018 Will Graham played the role of his grandfather Billy Graham in the motion picture Unbroken: Path to Redemption.

Graham's first book, Redeemed: Devotions for a Longing Soul a devotional book, was published by Thomas Nelson in 2018. It features stories centered on the life-changing power of a relationship with God.

== Family ==
Graham and his wife, Kendra, have two daughters, Christine Jane (CJ), Rachel Austin (Rae), and a son, William Franklin Graham V (Quinn).
