= Tullian Tchividjian =

American pastor and author

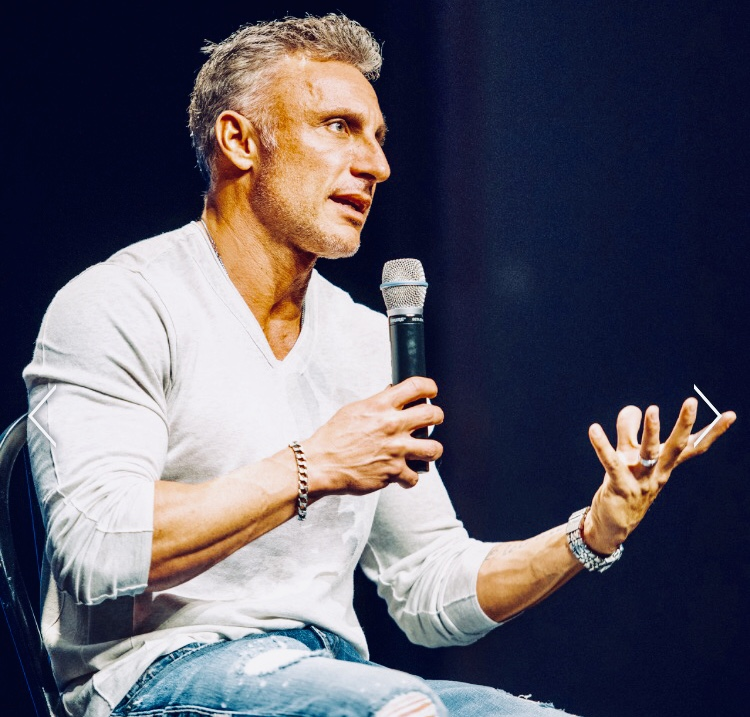
- Born: William Graham Tullian Tchividjian; July 13, 1972 (age 54); Jacksonville, Florida, U.S.
- Education: B.A., Columbia International University, M. Div. from Reformed Theological Seminary
- Known for: Senior Pastor of Coral Ridge Presbyterian Church (2009–2015)
- Spouses: Kim Tchividjian (m. 1994; div. 2015) Stacie Phillips (m. 2016)
- Children: 3
- Parent(s): Stephan Tchividjian; Gigi Graham
- Relatives: Billy Graham (grandfather); Ruth Graham (grandmother); Franklin Graham (uncle); Jerushah Duford (sister)

William Graham Tullian Tchividjian (/ˈtʌliən tʃɪˈvɪdʒɪn/; born July 13, 1972) is an American pastor and author of more than a half dozen books about Christianity and current issues, including One Way Love and It is Finished (David C. Cook, 2013 and 2015). He is a grandson of Christian evangelist Billy Graham.

Prior to 2015, Tchividjian blogged for some time for The Gospel Coalition, contributed to a variety of secular and Christian publications, and appeared on a variety of major televisions news programs.

Tchividjian founded an Evangelical Presbyterian Church congregation. In 2009 he was invited to merge churches and become the second senior pastor of Coral Ridge Presbyterian Church in Fort Lauderdale, Florida (after the church's late founder and longterm leader, D. James Kennedy). In 2015, Tchividjian resigned from Coral Ridge after admitting to an extramarital affair.

In 2019, Tullian Tchividjian started a new church in Jupiter, Florida, called "The Sanctuary".

== Biography ==
=== Early life and education ===
William Graham Tullian Tchividjian, whose third given name is shortened from his namesake, the theologian of antiquity, Tertullian, was born on July 13, 1972, in Jacksonville, Florida. He is the middle of seven children born to Stephan Tchividjian, a psychologist of Swiss and Armenian ancestry, and Gigi Graham, the eldest daughter of Billy Graham and Ruth Graham. Through his mother, he is a nephew of evangelists Franklin Graham and Anne Graham Lotz. Tchividjian's older brother, Basyle "Boz" Tchividjian, is a former Professor of Law at Liberty University School of Law in Lynchburg, Virginia, and the founder and former CEO of Godly Response to Abuse in the Christian Environment (GRACE).

Tchividjian attended the Westminster Academy, an educational ministry of Coral Ridge Presbyterian Church, Fort Lauderdale, Florida, for a time, but is described as having "dropped out during a period of rebellion - sinking into South Florida's 'pleasure-saturated culture' ... then [coming] to a personal faith in Jesus at the age of 21 and return[ing] to a Christian lifestyle." In this same rough time frame, he attended and graduated from Columbia International University, in Columbia, South Carolina, with a B.A. in philosophy in 1997. Tchividjian subsequently earned an M.Div. degree at Reformed Theological Seminary in Orlando in 2001, and was ordained in the Presbyterian Church in America (PCA) denomination in 2001.

== Career ==
=== New City Presbyterian (Coconut Creek) and earlier ===
Before founding New City Presbyterian Church in Coconut Creek, Florida, an Evangelical Presbyterian Church congregation, Tchividjian spent "a short two-year stint at a Cedar Springs Presbyterian Church in Knoxville, Tennessee". Tchividjian went on from that position to found and pastor New City in Coconut Creek - Margate, Florida, about 12 miles northwest of his earlier Westminster Academy school in Ft. Lauderdale, ca. 2003. The church has been described as "a young church plant." As of 2009, New City Presbyterian had a congregation of ca. 650 persons.

=== Coral Ridge Presbyterian (Fort Lauderdale) ===
==== Merger and installation ====
In 2009, a merger between the larger and widely known Coral Ridge Presbyterian Church in Fort Lauderdale, Florida and Tchividjian's New City Presbyterian was negotiated. Tchividjian noted at the time that "the denominations [of the merging churches] are both theologically conservative and [they] have maintained a good working relationship over the years."

As described by Tchividjian and others to James D. Davis, Religion Editor of the South Florida Sun-Sentinel, the process to decide leadership that resulted in the merger of the two congregations was a year-long process managed by "Coral Ridge's 15-member Pulpit Nominating Committee" (Dan Westphal, chair), who evaluated 150-175 candidates nationally and internationally. Coral Ridge is described as having approached Tchividjian three times during the process, beginning in May 2008, and his having stipulated the necessity of a church merger for him to consider that pastorate at Coral Ridge; the final discussion between Tchividjian and Coral Ridge began "just before Christmas [2008]."

Westphal announced the committee's selection of Tchividjian, pending congregational approval, to Coral Ridge congregants in a Sunday morning service on January 18, 2009, to "[g]asps, then applause" (as described by Davis of the Sun-Sentinel). The merger of the two congregations was official on Easter Sunday, April 12, 2009. Tchividjian was approved, with his installation on May 10, 2009 as senior pastor of Coral Ridge, formally succeeding its late founding pastor, D. James Kennedy; the installation address was delivered by Evangelical Christian writer and social critic, Os Guinness, and more than 5,000 are reported to have attended the installation worship service. Tchividjian brought with him a less formal worship style from New City, for instance, conducting services in a suit and tie rather than the vestments Kennedy had worn.

==== Challenge ====
At one time drawing 7,000 worshipers, Kennedy's Coral Ridge "had been in decline" since the death of its famous first preacher in 2007; Tchividjian's presented vision, his relative youth (aged 36 at time of installation), and his association with the famous Graham family and were seen by the church elders as a way to "revive... the aging congregation." At the time of Tchividjian's installation, Coral Ridge was described as having a weekly attendance at 1,800, from a membership of 2,200 persons. The combined weekly attendance of the merged congregations was anticipated to be on the order of 2,450 persons.

However, the response of the church to the difference in pastoral styles, and "Tchividjian's rejection of culture war politics" led to "chaos" in the church, and Tchividjian's recall was sought by a group led by Kennedy's daughter, Jennifer, within 6 months of his installation. In its description of the conflict, Bobby Ross Jr. of Christianity Today describes its outcome as "Tchividjian [having] survived an attempt… by… church members to remove him.

Tchividjian was retained by a majority of the congregation in September 2009. and the individuals bringing the removal action were described as being banned from the church.

==== Congregation size ====
At its peak, under Kennedy, as many as 7,000 worshipers attended Coral Ridge, although this number had declined between Kennedy's death in 2007, and 2009. In a Press Release from both churches just prior to the merger, Coral Ridge was described as having 2,200 members (with weekly attendance at 1,800), and New City as being "a church of 650 people." More than 5000 were said to be in attendance on the Sunday of Tchividjian's installation as the church's new senior pastor in spring of 2009. In September 2009 Coral Ridge was described by Christianity Today as having "2500-member[s]".

==== Resignation ====
On June 21, 2015, Tchividjian resigned as senior pastor of Coral Ridge Presbyterian Church after admitting to an extramarital affair. On August 11, the South Florida Presbytery of the PCA ruled him "unfit for Christian ministry" and deposed him from his call as teaching elder.

=== Willow Creek (Winter Springs) ===
On September 2, 2015 it was announced that Tchvidjian was hired to a non-leadership, non-pastoral staff position, as Director of Ministry Development at Willow Creek Church (PCA) in Winter Springs, Florida. Tchvidjian was fired from the position at Willow Creek on March 16, 2016, following the disclosure of a second extramarital affair, one predating his earlier admitted affair, one that had also occurred during his previous position in pastoral leadership at Coral Ridge.

=== The Sanctuary (Jupiter) ===
In 2019, Tullian Tchividjian announced the formation of The Sanctuary, an independent church, meeting in Jupiter, Florida.

== Other ministries led ==
Tchividjian was among those who founded LIBERATE, a resource ministry that held an annual conference, and published music, books and a radio program. LIBERATE was closed indefinitely after Tchividjian's resignation from Coral Ridge Presbyterian Church. A related organisation, Liberate Network, was initiated by Tchividjian after his hiring by Willow Creek Church in Winter Springs, Florida, but was disbanded within months of its launch, following his departure from that second church after the revelation of other affairs.

== Writings ==
=== Articles ===
Tchividjian has written for Christianity Today and other print outlets. In addition, Tchividjian was a contributor to Don't Call It a Comeback: The Old Faith for a New Day, published by the Reformed network called The Gospel Coalition (TGC) in 2011, and was a contributing editor of Christianity Today's Leadership Journal.

=== Blogging ===
Tchividjian was a regular blogger at TGC until 2014. In 2014, a dispute regarding differing theologies of sanctification was described by TGC founders Tim Keller and Don Carson as "becoming increasingly sharp and divisive rather than moving toward greater unity," leading the TGC Council to decide to remove Tchividjian's blog from the network's website. Part of the division stemmed from Tchividjian's teaching, which many within the Reformed community criticized as endorsing antinomianism, a claim which Tchividjian denies. For example, in a May 18, 2014 post (subsequently reposted on his own blog and later removed from TGC), he interpreted 1 John's 5:3's line that "[God's] commandments are not burdensome," to be a statement related to justification: "God’s commandments are not burdensome because we do not carry them." One response was that of Daniel R. Hyde, who called this a case of "right doctrine, wrong text: Christians are unburdened from the curse of the law by Jesus Christ, but 1 John 5:3 is about the child of God who has been born again and is now able to love God and his commands.

Christianity Today described Tchividjian's final blog post on the network as "complain[ing] that he had been abruptly ordered off the Reformed network," but noted that he later apologized for his role in the "very public 'break-up.'"

As of December 2016, Tchividjian has also written a few blog posts for a variety of other publications, including the Huffington Post, and the religious ecumenical website OnFaith.

=== Books ===
Tchividjian has written several books. Some of the works are as follows.

- — (2005). The Kingdom of God: A Primer on the Christian Life. Carlisle, PN: Banner of Truth. ISBN 0-85151-900-8.
- — (2009). Do I Know God? Finding Certainty in Life's Most Important Relationship. foreword by Billy Graham. Colorado Springs, CO and New York, NY: Multnomah [Penguin Random House/WaterBrook & Multnomah] and Knopf Doubleday Religious. ISBN 978-1-60142-218-7.
- — (2009). Unfashionable: Making a Difference in the World by Being Different. foreword by Timothy Keller. Colorado Springs, CO and New York, NY: Multnomah [Penguin Random House/WaterBrook & Multnomah] and Knopf Doubleday Religious. ISBN 978-1-60142-085-5.
- — (2010). Surprised by Grace: God's Relentless Pursuit of Rebels. Wheaton, IL: Crossway. ISBN 978-1-4335-2361-8.
- — (2011). Jesus + Nothing = Everything. Wheaton, IL: Crossway. ISBN 978-1-4335-0778-6.
- — (2012). Glorious Ruin: How Suffering Sets You Free. Zahl, David; Holcomb, Justin & Johnson, Matt. Colorado Springs, CO: David C Cook. ISBN 978-1-4347-0515-0.
- — (2013). One Way Love: Inexhaustible Grace for an Exhausted World. Zahl, David & Fitzpatrick, Elyse. Colorado Springs, CO: David C Cook. ISBN 978-0-7814-1089-2.
- — (2015). 'It is Finished': 365 Days of Good News. With Lannon, Nick. Colorado Springs, CO: David C Cook. ISBN 978-1-4347-0899-1.

==== Reception and controversy ====
Jesus + Nothing = Everything (2011) was the co-awardee of Christianity Today's Book Award in the category Christian Living in 2012, and was a finalist in the non-fiction category for the 2012 Christian Book Awards from the Evangelical Christian Publishers Association (ECPA). In 2013, Mark Jones, a minister in the Presbyterian Church of America, published a book on antinomianism that explicitly labeled Tchividjian's book as "one lengthy antinomian diatribe." Crossway, publisher of Tchividjian's Jesus + ..., took the book out of print in 2015 for the author's having violated a "morality clause" in his contract with them; per the Christian Post's reporting on a Tchividjian blog, the book's rights reverted to him.

Glorious Ruin: How Suffering Sets You Free (2012) was also a finalist in the non-fiction category for the 2013 Christian Book Awards from the ECPA.

As of December 2016, the Christian publisher David C. Cook remained committed to publishing Tchividjian's next book. In 2018, the Christian Post reported on Tchividjian blogging that indicated that Jesus + ... would be republished by Fortress Press.

=== Social media ===
Tchividjian has maintained a presence on social media throughout his ministry, and has "remained active on social media" since resigning his ministry positions in 2015, stating to Christianity Today that "leaving the public eye would undermine the message of grace" that he had advocated.

== Public appearances ==
Tchividjian has appeared on Fox News, Morning Joe, Sean Hannity, and The 700 Club.

== Personal life ==
In a story done at the time of the announcement of the merger of his New City church plant and Coral Ridge, Tchividjian is described as enjoying "weightlifting while playing the likes of Coldplay or John Mayer on his iPod… surfing when time permits, as well as spending time with wife Kim and their children."

Tchividjian married his first wife, Kim, in 1994; they have three children, Gabe, Nate, and Genna. In August 2015 Tchividjian filed for divorce.

In August 2016, he married Stacie Phillips. He is step-father to her two sons.
