= Franklin Graham =

American Christian evangelist and missionary (born 1952)

The Reverend Franklin Graham
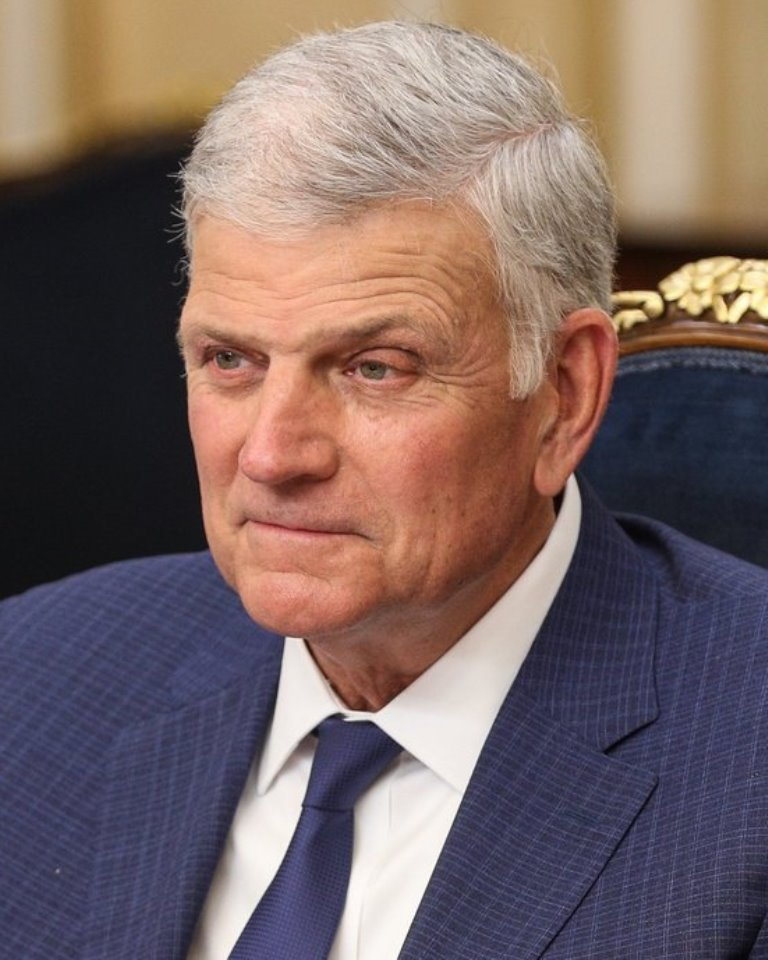
- Graham in 2021
- Born: William Franklin Graham III; July 14, 1952 (age 74); Asheville, North Carolina, U.S.
- Education: LeTourneau University; Montreat College (AS); Appalachian State University (BA)
- Occupation: Christian evangelist
- Political party: Republican (before 2015); Independent (2015–present)
- Spouse: Jane Cunningham (m. 1974)
- Children: 4, including Will
- Parent(s): Billy Graham; Ruth Graham
- Relatives: L. Nelson Bell (grandfather), Gigi Graham (sister), Anne Graham Lotz (sister)

President of the Billy Graham Evangelistic Association
- In office 2001–present
- Preceded by: Billy Graham

William Franklin Graham III (/ˈɡreɪəm/; born July 14, 1952) is an American evangelist and missionary in the evangelical movement. He frequently engages in Christian revival tours and political commentary. The son of Billy Graham, he is president and CEO of the Billy Graham Evangelistic Association (BGEA) and of Samaritan's Purse, an international evangelical Christian humanitarian aid organization. Under his leadership, Samaritan's Purse has become a leading global Christian relief organization, providing emergency assistance in crisis zones worldwide, including large-scale responses in Ukraine, Pakistan, and other regions affected by conflict or natural disasters. Graham has been considered as one of the most influential and best-known evangelicals in America, leading one of the largest charitable organizations in the United States, with $1.111 billion in private donations.

Graham became a "committed Christian" in 1974 and was ordained in 1982, and has since become a public speaker and author.

== Early life and education ==
William Franklin Graham III was born in Asheville, North Carolina, on July 14, 1952, to evangelist Billy Graham and Ruth Graham, the fourth of their five children. His father, Billy Graham, was one of the world's most renowned evangelists and civil rights advocates. The father originated from North Carolina, and was of Scots-Irish descent. His mother, Ruth Graham (née Ruth McCue Bell), was born in China to the medical missionary family of L. Nelson Bell, who served as head of the Presbyterian hospital in Qingjiang, China. Ruth's father, Franklin's maternal grandfather, Lemuel, in addition to his decades of medical missionary service, was a co-founder of Christianity Today.

Graham was raised in a log home in the Appalachian Mountains of North Carolina, surrounded by a family deeply committed to Christian ministry. During Franklin Graham's childhood, the Graham family lived in a house near Asheville, North Carolina. As his father, Billy Graham, gained national recognition, an increasing number of tourists began visiting their home daily. To ensure greater privacy, the family purchased several acres of land in the mountains outside of Montreat, North Carolina, where they built a log house named Little Piney Cove. Even after relocating to Little Piney Cove, the Graham family occasionally faced harassment from strangers, including death threats directed at Billy Graham by radical groups. Due to security concerns, the FBI recommended installing a security fence with electronic gates around the property. According to Franklin Graham, the family agreed to the measures, which effectively deterred unwanted intrusions.

Billy Graham was often absent during his children's upbringing, leaving his wife to take on the primary role in maintaining the family.

As a teenager, Graham attended The Stony Brook School, a Christian private school on Long Island, New York, but was expelled mid senior year. In his autobiography, Graham stated that he was very unhappy there and developed a "prisoner of war mentality", refusing to conform to the school's order or ways of thinking, and repeatedly breaking the rules (including its prohibition of smoking). He finished Owen High School in North Carolina, close to his home.

In 1970, Graham attended LeTourneau College in Longview, Texas, and was expelled from the school for keeping a female classmate out past curfew. In 1973, Graham joined Bob Pierce, founder of Samaritan's Purse, on a six-week mission to Asia. During this trip, Graham decided to focus on world relief. In 1974, he graduated from Montreat-Anderson College, now Montreat College, with an A.S. That same year on a trip to Jerusalem, he repented and experienced a new birth. After his studies, Graham was involved in administrative work related to preparation of his father's crusades. In 1978 he graduated from Appalachian State University with a B.A.

In his school days, Graham's favorite hobbies included "mountains, dogs, guns, and friends". According to his autobiography he would go out with his gun and dogs, build a campfire, and listen to music by artists such as Elvis Presley, Johnny Cash, Jerry Lee Lewis, Chuck Berry, and Little Richard on a transistor radio. He also developed an interest in motorcycles and airplanes.

== Ministerial career ==
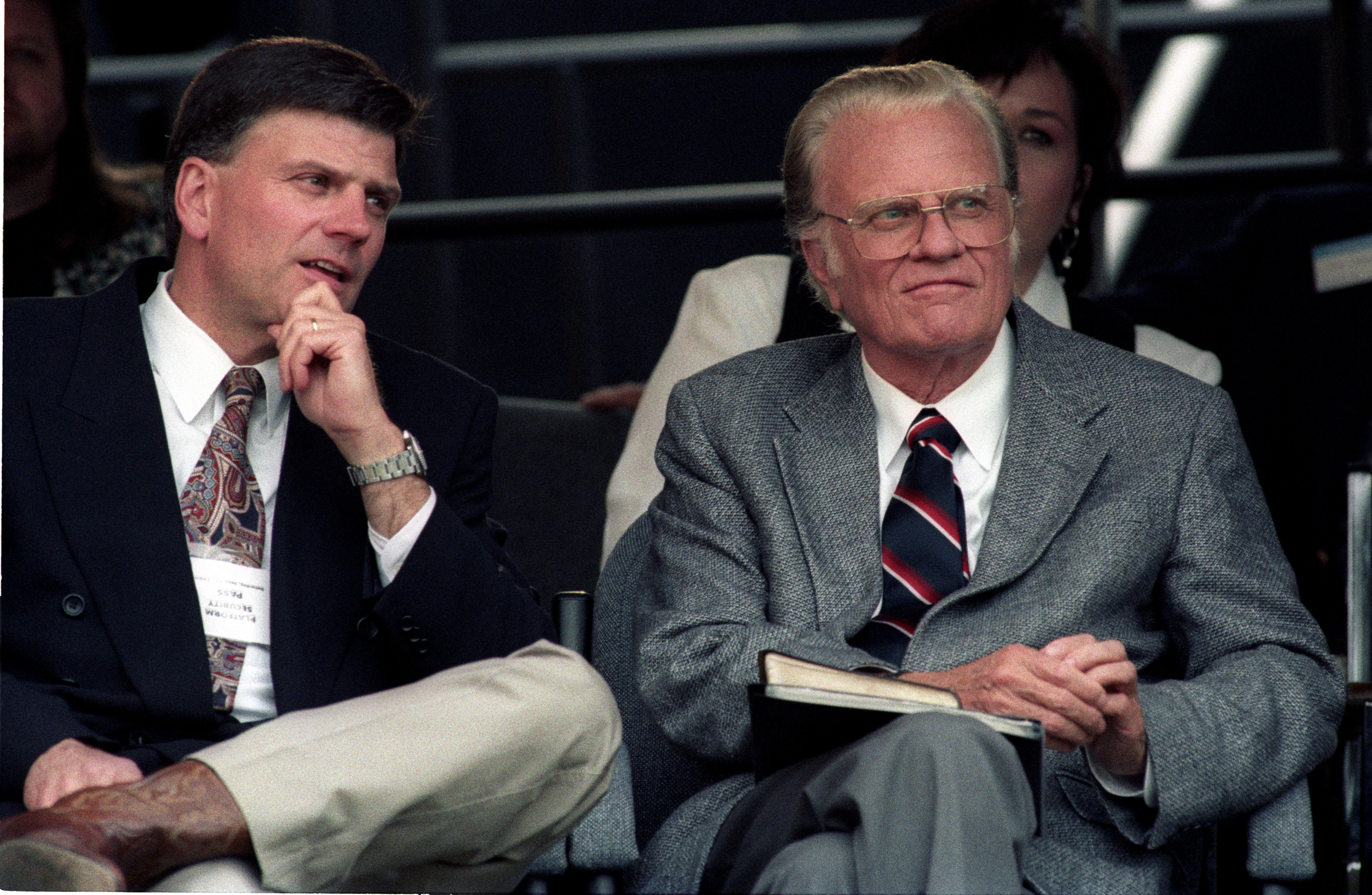
On the left, with his father Billy Graham, June 1994

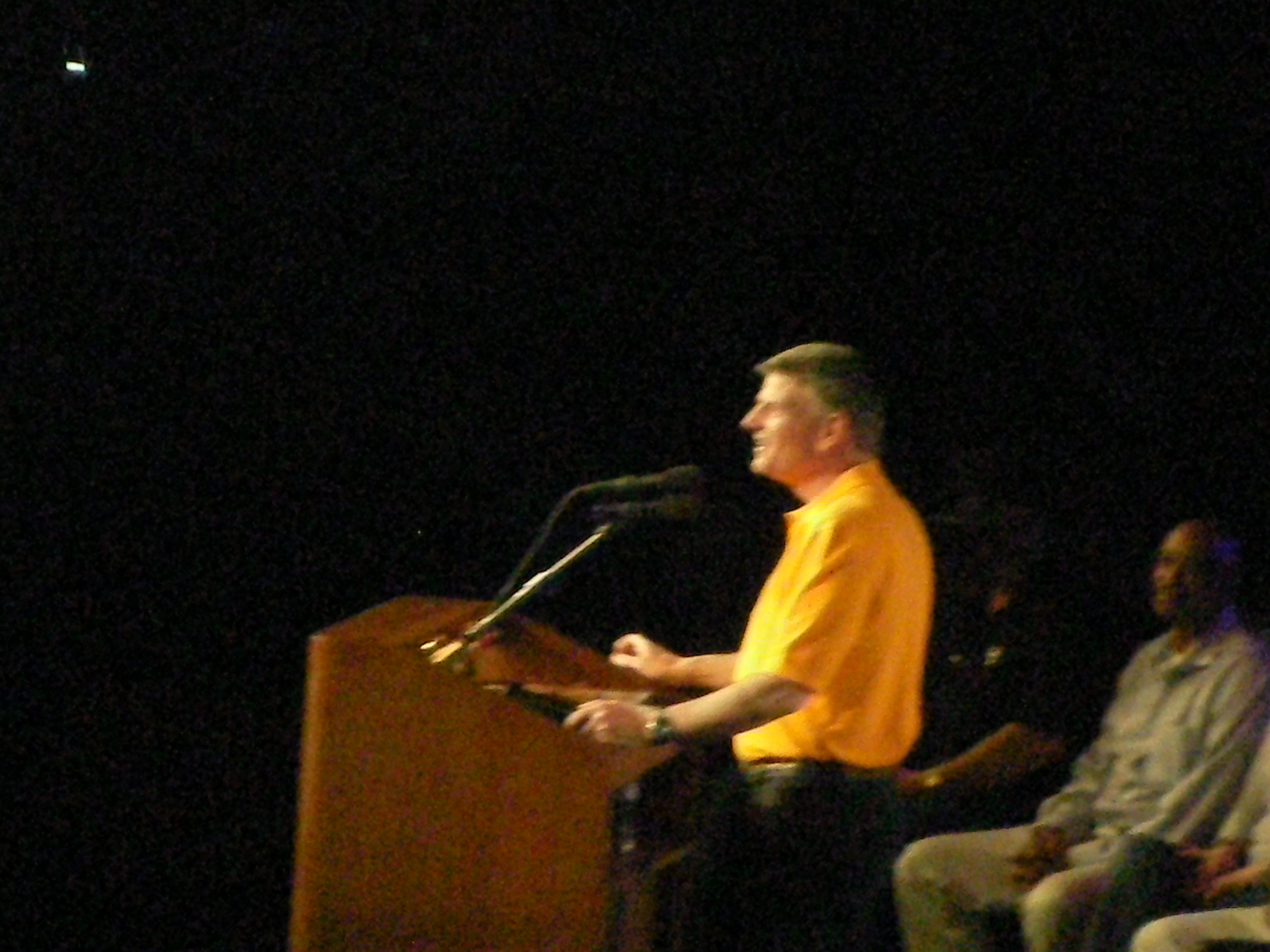
Graham preaching in Knoxville, Tennessee

Franklin Graham was ordained in 1982 by Grace Community Church in Tempe, Arizona, a non-denominational church. Graham gained his first experience in ministry in 1975 when he was invited by Bob Pierce, President of Samaritan's Purse, to accompany him on an international trip. According to Graham's autobiography, the journey included visits to missionary and refugee camps, hospitals, and meetings with government officials, church leaders, and missionaries in South Korea, Hong Kong, Indonesia, Thailand, India, and Nepal.

In 1979, after the death of Pierce, he became the president of Samaritan's Purse. According to Graham, he built the organization in close cooperation with the Board, mirroring it after the Billy Graham Evangelistic Association (BGEA) by adopting its policies and procedures.

In his first year as president of Samaritan's Purse, Franklin Graham managed the organization's operations from Boone, North Carolina, while administrative tasks were handled from its California office. In 1980 the headquarters was relocated to Boone, where it merged with World Medical Mission under one roof.

In 1982, Franklin Graham was ordained, marking the beginning of his evangelistic career. He denied that he was groomed to become a successor of his father. He argued that God had called him for his own work in the Samaritan's Purse.

In 1989, Franklin Graham held his first evangelistic event, continuing his father's preaching to large audiences in stadiums and other venues worldwide. He has preached at more than 325 outreaches across all 50 U.S. states and territories, as well as in over 55 countries. Since 1989, Graham has delivered sermons in Mexico, Poland, Vietnam, Italy, United Kingdom, and other countries.

In the early 1990s Franklin Graham was second second vice-chairman of the Billy Graham Evangelistic Association (BGEA). He was the only child of Billy Graham on the BGEA's board. It was speculated that Franklin Graham could become his father's successor in ministry; however, he denied that he could fulfill the role in the same way as Billy Graham. In 1995, at a crusade in Toronto, Billy Graham collapsed from a bleeding colon and, despite his hosts' efforts to find another preacher, insisted that his son Franklin take his place, highlighting Franklin's emerging role as his father's successor. A few month later in 1995, Franklin Graham became vice-president of the BGEA. According to Billy Graham's biographer, the decision to appoint his son, Franklin, as the head of the BGEA was initially controversial among some long-time employees who were critical of Franklin's lifestyle that clashed with the organization's conservative corporate traditions. At the same time, Franklin's father remained chairman and chief executive.

According to Billy Graham's autobiography, Franklin Graham gradually assumed greater leadership responsibilities within the Billy Graham Evangelistic Association (BGEA) as his father reduced his public engagements and administrative duties due to declining health. Billy Graham stated that Franklin's experience as the president of a global Christian relief and evangelism organization made him well-qualified to lead BGEA. In 2000, Franklin Graham was named the CEO of the organization, since his father retired from ministry. According to the BGEA spokeswoman, it was his father's decision to let his son take charge. In 2001, Franklin Graham succeeded his father, Billy Graham, as President of BGEA.

Franklin Graham continued the crusade ministry following his father's final evangelistic event, the Greater New York Crusade, held in June 2005. In 2006, Billy Graham preached alongside Franklin at two events: the Celebration of Hope in New Orleans and the Metro Maryland Festival in Baltimore.

=== Relations to U.S. politicians ===
Throughout his long ministry, Franklin Graham has had several encounters with U.S. presidents. For example, during his early career, Graham met with President Jimmy Carter. This meeting was linked to his father, Billy Graham's, longstanding relationship with Carter dating back to the 1973 Atlanta Crusade and later integrated evangelical outreach activities in Georgia. Franklin Graham also met with former president George H. W. Bush during events that included the dedication of the Billy Graham Library and prayer services held during the Gulf War. At President George W. Bush's inauguration, Franklin Graham delivered a prayer of invocation.

== Evangelistic crusades ==
=== Return to Glasgow ===
Following his legal victory against the Scottish Event Campus (SEC) in 2022, Franklin Graham returned to Glasgow in June 2024 to hold an evangelistic event at the OVO Hydro arena, the same venue that had previously canceled his event. More than 7,500 people attended the event as part of Graham's "God Loves You" tour. Speaking to the crowd, Graham emphasized forgiveness, faith, and unity, stating, "Maybe you're here tonight and you're wanting to know, who is Jesus? Jesus Christ is God's Son and He came on a rescue mission to save you from your sins."

The Billy Graham Evangelistic Association (BGEA) called the event a significant moment for religious freedom in the UK, demonstrating that Christian evangelists could continue to hold public gatherings despite previous opposition. Graham stated, "This is a victory, not just for us, but for all Christians and churches across the U.K."

=== Ethiopia ===
In March 2025, Franklin Graham led a large-scale evangelistic event, Encountering God Ethiopia, at Meskel Square in Addis Ababa, Ethiopia. Over 430,000 people attended the two-day outreach, and at least 4,000 people publicly committed their faith in Jesus Christ. During the event, Graham emphasized themes of repentance, salvation, and God's love for Ethiopia, drawing parallels to his father Billy Graham, who had preached in the same city 65 years earlier.

=== European Congress on Evangelism ===
In May 2025, Franklin Graham held the European Congress on Evangelism in Berlin, drawing about 1,000 Christian leaders from 55–56 countries. The meeting emphasized "proclamation evangelism," urging pastors to preach the gospel "unashamedly" amid perceived cultural opposition. The event also highlighted tensions within European evangelicalism: British apologist Amy Orr-Ewing reported unprecedented openness to the Christian message among Gen Z, while Finnish MP Päivi Räsänen's ongoing legal case illustrated constraints on public religious expression. During the congress on 28 May 2025, Graham met Ukrainian president Volodymyr Zelenskyy and led delegates in prayer for peace in the Russia–Ukraine war, also praying for Vladimir Putin and U.S. president Donald Trump.

== Humanitarian efforts ==
As president of Samaritan's Purse, Franklin Graham has overseen a broad range of humanitarian relief efforts in response to conflicts, natural disasters, and other emergencies around the world. In the aftermath of the Watergate scandal, the Vietnam War, and increasing divisions within evangelicalism, Franklin Graham's father, Billy Graham, prioritized evangelism while maintaining a commitment to humanitarian work. During the mid-1970s, world hunger became a significant concern among evangelicals, as famine in Africa gained widespread attention through relief agencies and media coverage, leading to a surge in faith-based aid efforts. This movement contributed to the expansion of evangelical relief organizations, including the establishment of Samaritan's Purse, which Franklin Graham later led.

In 1978, while studying at Appalachian State University, Franklin Graham was approached by surgeons Lowell and Dick Furman from Boone, North Carolina, who proposed establishing an organization to send Christian physicians to missionary hospitals for short-term voluntary service. Graham agreed to assist with administrative responsibilities and initiated contact with approximately 30 mission hospitals to assess the need for short-term medical assistance. Following a positive response, World Medical Mission, the medical ministry of Samaritan's Purse, was founded.

Under Graham, Samaritan's Purse has become one of the largest Christian charitable organizations in the US. As of 2025, Samaritan's Purse maintained offices in the United States, Australia, Canada, Germany, Korea and the United Kingdom, providing aid in over 100 countries worldwide. According to the Forbes 2024 ranking, the Samaritan's Purse was ranked 13th among the 100 largest charitable organizations in the United States, with $1.111 billion in private donations. While it occasionally partners with U.S. government agencies, only about 5% of its budget in recent years has come from federal grants.

Franklin Graham has regularly called on the global Christian community to pray for those affected, emphasizing prayer for peace in Ukraine, the Middle East, and other crisis zones. He has also stated that Samaritan's Purse "does not force religion on anyone" but shares Christian faith while meeting urgent needs.

Regarding the Trump administration's 90-day freeze on USAID, Graham is supportive. "I think it's a good thing for the government to assess and reexamine the various programs that the U.S. is funding around the world", Graham said. However, Graham added, "the details of the waiver process are not yet clear." Less than 5% of Samaritan's Purse's budget for 2024 came from government grants.

=== Operation Christmas Child ===
In 1993, Franklin Graham was contacted by British businessman Dave Cooke, who had founded Operation Christmas Child in 1990. Initially, the project involved collecting shoeboxes filled with gifts for children in Romania after the Cold War. Cooke asked Graham if he would help expand the initiative by providing shoeboxes filled with gifts for children affected by the war in Bosnia. Under Graham's leadership, Samaritan's Purse officially took over Operation Christmas Child. In November 2022, Samaritan's Purse celebrated a milestone by distributing its 200 millionth shoebox through Operation Christmas Child.

=== Victims of HIV/AIDS ===
Leading Samaritan's Purse, Graham has been an advocate for victims of HIV/AIDS since the 1980s. In February 2002, he organized a five-day international conference on HIV/AIDS in Washington, D.C. Graham described HIV/AIDS as a greater threat than terrorism and urged Christians to set aside their prejudices and help prevent its spread globally. In 2004, Foreign Affairs journal noted, "Graham's superstar status among evangelicals and the conference's heartbreaking testimony from African ministers and health workers convinced American religious conservatives that it was their moral duty to do something about the pandemic."

In 2001, Samaritan's Purse allocated only $1.6 million for HIV/AIDS prevention efforts due to a lack of donor-designated contributions for such programs. In 2012, Graham stated that individuals with HIV or AIDS are often marginalized, similar to how those with leprosy were treated in biblical times, and asserted that the church should respond with compassion and support. As a result, Samaritan's Purse introduced programs fighting HIV/AIDS in Africa. Graham partnered with rock musician Bono to raise awareness about HIV/AIDS globally. In late 2002, Franklin Graham gathered with Bono and the Brooklyn Tabernacle Youth Choir at New York's JFK International Airport to send off more than 80,000 Operation Christmas Child shoebox gifts, which were loaded onto a cargo jet for delivery to Ugandan children affected by HIV/AIDS. Graham also influenced President George W. Bush to encourage his involvement in funding AIDS relief.

=== 2007 Mexico floods ===
In November 2007, Graham led Samaritan's Purse in responding to severe flooding in Mexico's Tabasco region. With the support of local churches and relief teams he distributed survival kits, deployed community water filtration systems, and coordinated medical care for those stranded by floodwaters.

=== 2017 emergency field hospital near Mosul, Iraq ===
In 2017, Franklin Graham's organization, Samaritan's Purse, partnered with the Iraqi Health Ministry and the World Health Organization to establish an emergency field hospital near Mosul, Iraq, during the battle against ISIS. Located just 6 miles (10 km) from the front lines, this 54-bed trauma hospital provided critical medical care to civilians, Iraqi soldiers, and even ISIS fighters injured in the conflict.

The facility featured two operating rooms, an intensive care unit, and emergency care wards, treating over 1,000 patients in the first few months alone. More than 435 major surgeries were performed, including amputations for children injured by shrapnel, drone attacks, and sniper fire. Some patients had been trapped under rubble for days before being rescued.

Dr. Elliott Tenpenny, the hospital's director, noted that 95% of critically injured patients would not have survived the long journey to a permanent hospital in Erbil without the field facility. The United Nations praised the hospital for its role in saving lives. Graham stated that the hospital's mission was to provide compassionate care in Jesus' name, regardless of the patients' background, including injured ISIS militants.

=== Ukraine ===
In response to the 2022 Russian invasion of Ukraine, Graham deployed Samaritan's Purse disaster response specialists to Poland and Romania, providing medical supplies, food, and temporary shelter. The charity also shipped and delivered over 600,000 Operation Christmas Child shoebox gifts to children in Ukraine, and set up field hospitals to treat the wounded.

The organization has also conducted airlifts to deliver medical supplies, food, and relief items, as well as provided training to local healthcare providers. As of September 2022, Samaritan's Purse had conducted at least 30 airlifts carrying essential relief and medical equipment into Ukraine. According to the Ukrainian government, Samaritan's Purse has been operating in Ukraine since the start of the hostilities in Ukrainian Donbas in 2014. Since the full-scale Russian invasion in 2022, the organization, through local partners, has been delivering food, water, warm clothing, and medical assistance. During the organization's work in Ukraine, Franklin Graham visited the teams operating the hospital and offering medical assistance. More than 9.6 million Ukrainians have benefited from this aid. The organization has established cooperation with 2,000 Ukrainian partners.

In March 2025, Franklin Graham spoke with Ukrainian President Volodymyr Zelenskyy to discuss humanitarian aid efforts and support for Ukraine amid the ongoing war. Zelenskyy publicly thanked Graham for his assistance through Samaritan's Purse, which has provided medical care, supplies, and disaster relief to affected Ukrainian civilians. During their meeting, Zelenskyy informed Graham about Ukraine's acceptance of a United States proposal for a 30-day unconditional ceasefire and emphasized the importance of international pressure in achieving peace. He also highlighted Graham's role, stating that Ukraine values his voice and relies on his support.

In May 2025, when Franklin Graham was convening the European Congress on Evangelism in Berlin, Germany, he met with President Zelensky. Graham prayed for Zelenskyy and prayed for an end to the conflict.

=== 2022 Pakistan floods ===
In August 2022, following severe monsoon flooding that devastated one-third of Pakistan, Franklin Graham directed Samaritan's Purse to launch an immediate relief operation. During August and September the provided help included distribution of emergency food, water filtration kits, shelter materials, and hygiene supplies to thousands of affected families. Graham emphasized the importance of demonstrating Christian compassion, aligning with his approach of deploying rapid assistance to global disaster zones.

=== Gaza war (2023-present) ===
In October 2023, after the initial outbreak of the Israel–Hamas conflict, Graham visited Israel to assess humanitarian needs and provide assistance through Samaritan's Purse. The organization pledged to send 42 replacement ambulances, trauma kits, and essential medical supplies, partnering with over 50 local churches to distribute relief to displaced families in both Israel and Gaza. In July 2025, Samaritan's Purse began airlifting food to Gaza, sending 65 tons of food for starving Palestinians on three air missions.

=== 2023 earthquake relief in Turkey ===
In February 2023, after a 7.8-magnitude earthquake devastated Turkey and Syria, Franklin Graham's Samaritan's Purse deployed a 52-bed emergency field hospital to Antakya, Turkey (ancient Antioch). The hospital was strategically placed in a damaged regional medical center's parking lot and became a crucial healthcare provider, treating over 530 earthquake victims in its first week.

The hospital included two operating rooms, an intensive care unit, an X-ray unit, and a pharmacy, with more than 100 medical staff rotating every two weeks. Graham personally visited the site, emphasizing the hospital's role in providing orthopedic care for victims suffering from fractures and crush injuries. Among the patients was a 14-year-old boy who had been buried under rubble for more than a week.

Graham described the scale of destruction as "unbelievable" and committed to long-term aid efforts, including distributing tents, blankets, water purification systems, and hygiene kits. He noted that Samaritan's Purse would remain in Turkey for at least three months, possibly longer, depending on the needs of the people.

=== Hurricane Helene ===
In response to Hurricane Helene in western North Carolina Franklin Graham mobilised about 35,000 volunteers and oversaw the largest civilian airlift operation in U.S. history, flying 385 air missions to deliver 7000,000 pounds of supplies. Graham also promised to rebuild destroyed homes, and he started welcoming the first families into their new homes in May 2025. The homes were provided for survivors for free and were fully furnished.

=== Texas Floods ===
In early July 2025, severe flash flooding struck central Texas, leaving at least 104 people dead across multiple counties, including Kerr, Burnet, Kendall, Travis, Tom Green, and Williamson. The flooding was caused by torrential rains that led the Guadalupe River to rise rapidly—cresting at more than 39 feet (12 m) and surpassing the previous record set in 1987. Among the victims were campers at Camp Mystic, a private Christian girls' camp located along the Guadalupe River. In addition to deploying disaster relief teams with Samaritan's Purse and chaplains with the Billy Graham Rapid Response Team, Franklin Graham prayed with distraught families waiting for the bodies of their loved ones to be discovered. On July 8, 2025, Graham wrote, "This morning, I joined Secretary of Homeland Security Kristi Noem via phone from Alaska to pray for families gathered in a church in Kerrville, Texas, to await word about their missing children and loved ones," wrote Graham. "I read Scripture to them and prayed for them, and Secretary Kristi Noem prayed for them as well. We need to continue to surround these devastated families and communities in prayer."

== Political views and activism ==
In December 2015, Franklin Graham left the Republican Party. He stated, "This is an example of why I have resigned from the Republican Party and declared myself Independent. I have no hope in the Republican Party, the Democratic Party, or Tea Party to do what is best for America." His decision came in response to a GOP-led budget that continued funding Planned Parenthood, which he criticized for its fetal tissue donation practices, comparing them to Nazi atrocities. Graham's move reflected broader evangelical frustration with mainstream politics, and he subsequently launched a series of prayer rallies to mobilize Christian voters. He criticized both Republicans and Democrats for passing a budget that continued funding Planned Parenthood.

=== Donald Trump ===
In April 2011, Graham told ABC's This Week program that Donald Trump, who had recently declared an interest in the Republican nomination for the 2012 U.S. presidential race, was his preferred candidate. During an MSNBC Morning Joe interview on February 21, 2012, Graham said that Rick Santorum was most closely aligned to "Christian values" in his words and deeds and that Senator Santorum was certainly a "Christian at heart". On President Obama, Graham said he is "a fine man", but he could not know whether the president was a Christian. Asked about Mitt Romney, Graham said that most Protestants do not view Mormonism as a Christian faith.

In June 2016, Graham told a crowd, "I have zero hope for the Democratic Party; I have no hope for the Republican Party. I am running a campaign to put God back in the political process." Nevertheless, in November 2016, Graham told The Washington Post that God had played a role in Donald Trump's election as U.S. president, saying: "I could sense going across the country that God was going to do something this year. And I believe that at this election, God showed up." The same newspaper noted that the day after Trump's victory, Graham had posted a comment on Facebook in which he wrote, "Did God show up? […] In watching the news after the election, the secular media kept asking 'How did this happen?' 'What went wrong?' 'How did we miss this?' Some are in shock. Political pundits are stunned. Many thought the Trump/Pence ticket didn't have a chance. None of them understand the God-factor." At the first inauguration of Donald Trump, Graham chose to read a passage from chapter 2 of Paul's First Epistle to Timothy, which calls for prayers for all people, including "kings and for all those in authority, that we may live peacefully quiet lives in all godliness and holiness."

Graham expressed the same belief after Joe Biden was elected president. In an interview with ABC News, Graham said, "God put him in that seat. All authority in heaven has been given by God. All authority—that means Joe Biden."

Since the 2016 election, Graham has been a prominent supporter of some of Trump's policies on the U.S. economy, abortion, and religious freedom. He strongly opposed the first impeachment of Donald Trump, calling it an "unjust inquisition." In a November 21, 2019, interview with Eric Metaxas, Graham suggested opposition to Trump was the work of a "demonic power." In December, when Christianity Today magazine, founded by Graham's father Billy, published an editorial calling Trump "profoundly immoral" and supporting his removal from office, Graham responded by saying his father had voted for Trump and saw him as the "man for this hour in history for our nation" and that the magazine was "representing the elitist liberal wing of evangelicalism." Graham did not support and expressed dismay about the attack on the U.S. Capitol that took place in January 2021.

In mid-December 2020, Graham wrote about the first Trump presidency on Facebook, saying that "President Trump will go down in history as one of the great presidents of our nation, bringing peace and prosperity to millions here in the U.S. and around the world."

In January 2021, Graham compared the ten Republican members of the United States House of Representatives who voted for the second impeachment of Donald Trump to Judas Iscariot, suggesting that the Democrats had promised them "thirty pieces of silver".

In 2024, Graham wrote a private letter to President Trump asking him to stop using profanity. During the 2024 Republican National Convention, Trump publicly said he was trying to follow Graham's advice to stop swearing.

In October 2025 Graham wrote a letter to Trump praising him for his peacemaking efforts and outlining God's plan of salvation.

=== North Carolina Amendment 1 ===
Graham supported North Carolina Amendment 1, which was passed by a voter referendum on May 8, 2012, prohibiting same-sex marriage and all domestic partnerships. Graham responded to Obama's May 9, 2012, statement of support for same-sex marriage, saying, "President Obama has, in my view, shaken his fist at the same God who created and defined marriage. It grieves me that our president would now affirm same-sex marriage, though I believe it grieves God even more."

In December 2017, several British MPs urged the Home Secretary to consider refusing UK entry to Graham from speaking at an event due to take place in Blackpool in September 2018. As Graham represents the evangelical community, critics argued that those who want to ban Graham, which means that individuals who have different opinions of LGBT rights would be banned in the UK. Gordon Marsden, an openly gay Labour MP, suggested that Graham's comments may have contravened British laws on hate speech. As of February 2018, a petition against Graham being granted a visa had gathered more than 7,500 signatures. The pastor of Liberty Church in Blackpool, who organized the petition, said: "As a Christian and as a leader of a church that particularly welcomes LGBT people, I'm horrified that other local churches are inviting someone with this record of hate speech." The pastor said that Graham's visit had triggered an "enormous amount of protest from Christians in the north-west" of England, and his presence would be "extremely destructive in the area".

In addition to the criticisms, local religious leaders provided a different perspective. An imam stated, "I heard there was an evangelist from America who was coming here to Blackpool and he would be preaching hate speech, so I wanted to come and see for myself. There was nothing hateful in what I heard." Steve Haskett, vicar of the Anglican church of St. John's in Blackpool, added, "Franklin will come with a positive message of hope. There are few people around who can share the Christian message with the clarity and conviction that Franklin does and that's why we've invited him."

=== 2025 Donald Trump inauguration ===
At the inauguration ceremony for President Donald Trump on January 20, 2025, Graham gave an invocation in which he thanked God for Trump's win and stated, "Mr President, over the last four years I'm sure there were times when you thought it was pretty dark. But look at what God has done. We praise him and give him glory."

=== Legal and political advocacy in the UK ===
Franklin Graham has actively advocated for religious freedom and challenged restrictions on Christian evangelism. His legal victories in the United Kingdom, particularly in Blackpool and Glasgow, have reinforced protections for religious expression under UK law.

In 2020–2022, Graham's events in multiple UK cities faced cancellations by local authorities and venue operators, often due to concerns about his past comments on LGBTQ+ issues and Islam. Graham and the Billy Graham Evangelistic Association (BGEA) took legal action against multiple venues, arguing that their cancellations violated the UK Equality Act (2010).

The court rulings in both Blackpool and Glasgow established legal precedents protecting Christian evangelists' right to public speech, with judges affirming that venues and government officials must remain neutral and cannot suppress religious views due to public opposition. Graham's legal team stated that these cases represent a landmark defense of religious liberty in modern Britain.

=== Foreign policy views ===
==== Support of the Iraq War Effort ====
On the eve of the 2003 Invasion of Iraq, Graham called for support for the president "and the men and women in harm's way."

==== Opposition to indicting Sudan's Al-Bashir ====
When the International Criminal Court indicted Sudanese president Omar Hassan al-Bashir in March 2009, Graham argued in an op-ed in The New York Times that Bashir should not be indicted for alleged genocidal acts because the indictment would lead to the collapse of the 2005 peace agreement.

==== Commentary about Vladimir Putin ====
In a February 28, 2014 opinion piece titled "Putin's Olympic Controversy: Morality & Nations in a Changing World", Franklin Graham defended aspects of Russian President Vladimir Putin's policy that banned "propaganda of nontraditional sexual relations to minors." Graham argued that the law was intended to protect children from what he considered harmful influences. He noted that American media and liberal activists had reacted strongly against the law, while he contrasted this reaction with what he perceived as a decline in American moral standards.

Graham also acknowledged that Putin's background—as a former KGB officer and a political figure with personal controversies—leads some critics to label him as ruthless and compare him to a modern czar. He stated, "To be clear, I am not endorsing President Putin. To survive in the KGB and rise to power in Russia, you have to be tough." Despite his reservations about other aspects of Putin's leadership, Graham expressed the opinion that on the specific issue of protecting children, Putin's policy was justified.

==== Political support for Ukraine ====
Franklin Graham visited Ukraine in March 2022, immediately after the full-scale Russian invasion of Ukraine. Graham conducted an Easter Sunday sermon from Ukraine and addressed both Presidents Putin and Volodymyr Zelenskyy, calling for a 10-day ceasefire between Russia and Ukraine in observance of the Easter holiday.

==== Relations with Ethiopia ====
Franklin Graham's 2025 crusade in Ethiopia coincided with a period of shifting political dynamics between Ethiopia's government and the Trump administration. Reports suggested that the Ethiopian government viewed Graham's influence among American evangelicals as a potential diplomatic channel to improve relations with Donald Trump, who had distanced himself from Abiy Ahmed during his presidency. Critics of the Ethiopian government questioned whether the event had an implicit political strategy behind it. However, Graham himself maintained that his primary mission was solely to preach the Gospel. Samaritan's Purse has an extensive history of humanitarian work in Ethiopia since the 1980s, including drilling water wells and responding to the war in Tigray by providing life-saving aid to nearly 300,000 people and distributing over 51,000 tons of food.

== Reception and controversies ==
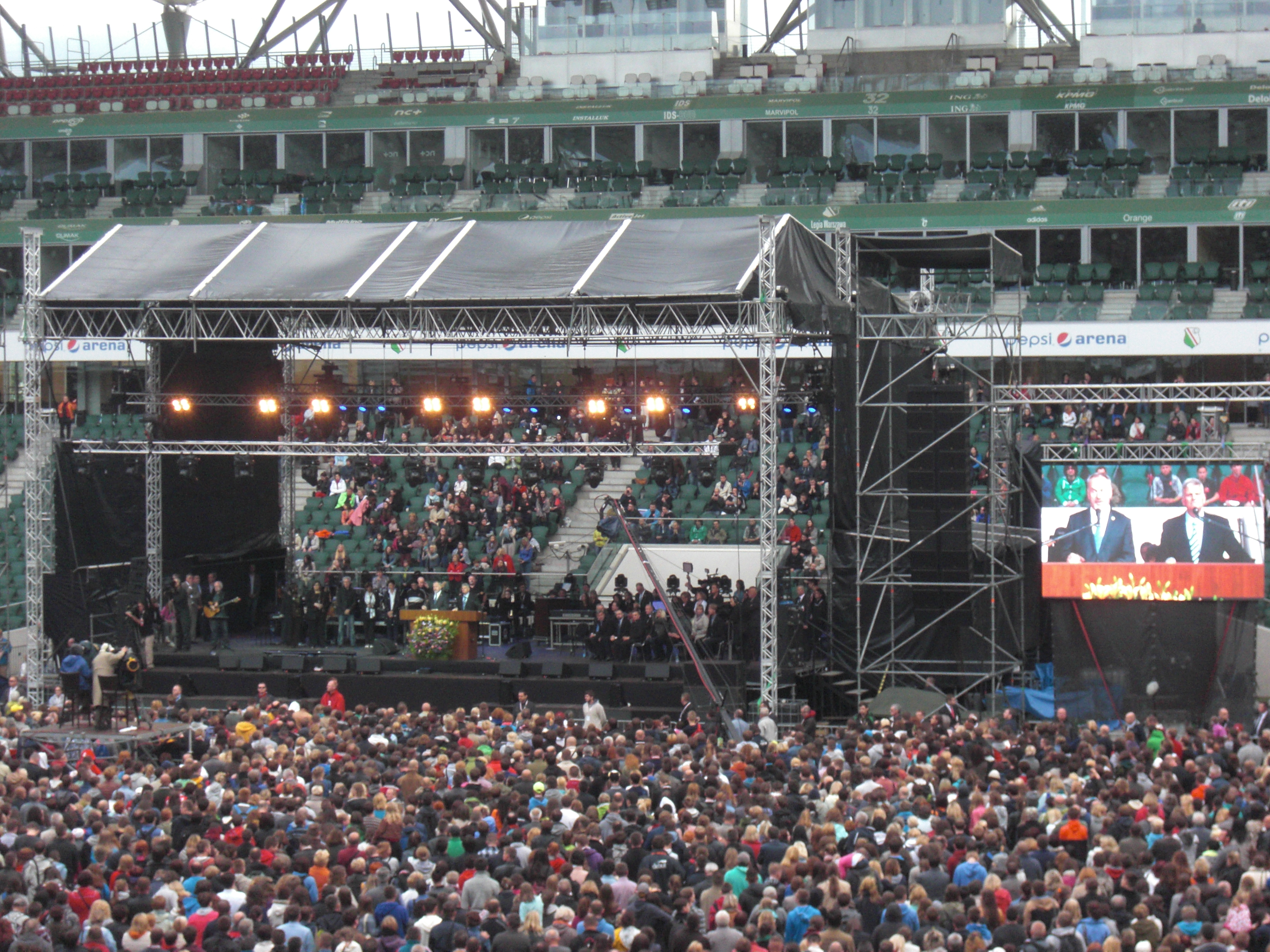
Warsaw (June 14, 2014)

=== COVID vaccination ===
Graham has said in interviews and social media posts that he believes Jesus would approve of the COVID-19 vaccine, saying "that's what Jesus Christ would want us to do, to help save life. It's just a tool to help save life." He has compared the vaccine to the oil and wine the Good Samaritan used to treat the wounds of the injured traveler, saying "Now the oil and wine were the medicines of that day." He told ABC News, "I think for a pastor to tell someone not to take the vaccine is problematic because what would happen if that person got coronavirus and died?"

Graham has also cited the work of Samaritan's Purse in describing his support for the vaccine. "We have seen what COVID can do", said Graham, citing Samaritan's Purse work to help during the outbreaks in Cremona, Italy; Los Angeles; North Carolina and the Bahamas.

Graham has also spoken of seeing the effects of the virus in his own organization. "I've had some of my own staff, one of them was on a ventilator for three months, Graham said in an interview with CBS News, "...from what I have seen and experienced myself, I don't want COVID and I don't want anybody else to get it." Graham stated that he and his wife are both vaccinated. He also stated, "I want people to know that COVID-19 can kill you. But we have a vaccine out there that could possibly save your life. And if you wait, it could be too late."

=== Islam ===
Graham came under criticism for comments he made about Islam in the wake of the September 11, 2001, attacks when he referred to Islam as "a very evil and wicked religion." A month earlier, Graham told CNN that Americans should not generalize Muslims, stating that a "small group of people" was responsible for the terror attacks. Further criticism came on April 18, 2003, when he preached at a Good Friday service at the Pentagon. Graham has made controversial remarks against Islam saying, "True Islam cannot be practiced in this country", to CNN's Campbell Brown in December 2009. "You can't beat your wife. You cannot murder your children if you think they've committed adultery or something like that, which they do practice in these other countries." On April 22, 2010, after objections from the Military Religious Freedom Foundation and the Muslim group Council on American–Islamic Relations (CAIR), the Pentagon rescinded his invitation from the Christian conservative National Day of Prayer Task Force to speak at a Pentagon National Day of Prayer event.

In the August 30, 2010, issue of Time magazine, "Does America Hate Islam?" Graham reportedly said that Islam "is a religion of hatred. It's a religion of war." Building the cultural center near Ground Zero, he says, means Muslims "will claim now that the World Trade Center property...is Islamic land."

In September 2010, Graham claimed on ABC's This Week with Christiane Amanpour that building churches and synagogues is forbidden in most Muslim-majority countries.

=== Two salaries ===
Franklin Graham drew scrutiny in 2009 for drawing a full-time salary from Samaritan's Purse while simultaneously receiving a full-time salary from Billy Graham Evangelistic Association (BGEA). This was called into question after his 2008 compensation from both organizations totaled $1.2 million. (Most of this was the result of a new IRS rule that required him to re-report deferred retirement contributions that had already been reported over the previous three years.) Some experts on non-profit organizations have questioned whether one person can perform two full-time jobs leading organizations that employ hundreds and spend hundreds of millions around the world. In response to the questions about his compensation, Graham decided to give up his salary from BGEA, stating his calling to the ministry "was never based on compensation." He also had contributions to his retirement plans suspended until the economy bounced back. However, Graham was again criticized in 2015 when it was revealed he had again taken up his salary from BGEA where his annual compensation was significantly higher than that of the CEO's of similar, but much larger, non-profit organizations.

According to 2014 data, Graham is the highest paid Samaritan's Purse employee at $622,252 annually and leads other charities in compensation. The preacher gave up a salary at the evangelistic association during the late economic downturn, but the leaders urged him to accept compensation again and he now receives increased retirement contributions as well as a regular salary. The evangelistic association reported 2013 revenues as $106.5 million and 2014 as $112,893,788.

=== Barack Obama (2009–2017) ===
On August 19, 2010, when asked by CNN correspondent John King if he had doubts that President Barack Obama is a Christian, Graham stated, "I think the president's problem is that he was born a Muslim; his father was a Muslim. The seed of Islam is passed through the father like the seed of Judaism is passed through the mother. He was born a Muslim, his father gave him an Islamic name." Graham continued, "Now it's obvious that the president has renounced the prophet Mohammed, and he has renounced Islam, and he has accepted Jesus Christ. That's what he says he has done. I cannot say that he hasn't. So I just have to believe that the president is what he has said." In a March 2011 interview with the conservative Internet publication Newsmax, Graham claimed officials in the Obama administration had connections to the Muslim Brotherhood:

The Muslim Brotherhood is very strong and active in our country. It's infiltrated every level of our government. Right now we have many of these people that are advising the US military and State Department on how to respond in the Middle East, and it's like asking a fox, like a farmer asking a fox, "How do I protect my henhouse from foxes?" We've brought in Muslims to tell us how to make policy toward Muslim countries. And many of these people we've brought in, I'm afraid, are under the Muslim Brotherhood.

On February 28, 2012, Graham responded to a one-page letter sent by the National Association for the Advancement of Colored People (NAACP) as an: "Open Letter from Leaders of Faith Regarding Statements by Franklin Graham." In the introduction to the one-page letter, the fourteen signatories stated: "We are greatly troubled by recent attempts by some religious leaders to use faith as a political weapon. We were disturbed and disappointed by statements made by Rev. Franklin Graham during an interview on MSNBC that questioned whether President Obama is a Christian." In closing, the open-letter stated: "We call on Rev. Graham and all Christian leaders to exemplify this essential teaching of Jesus and refrain from using Christianity as a weapon of political division."

In an open letter response, Graham apologized to President Obama, saying, "I regret any comments I have ever made which may have cast any doubt on the personal faith of our president, Mr. Obama. The president has said he is a Christian and I accept that." In the open letter closing Graham stated, "In this election season and challenging economic time I am praying for our country and for those who lead it—for we are commanded in Scripture to do so."

=== Hinduism ===
Graham has commented on Hinduism as well, saying, "No elephant with 100 arms can do anything for me. None of their 9,000 gods is going to lead me to salvation."

=== Support for conversion therapy ===
In 2017 Graham spoke against a bill proposing a ban on conversion therapy. Referencing the biblical text of Leviticus 18:22, he said, "Democrats are proposing a bill to ban conversion therapy in the United States, saying that LGBTQ people were born perfect. Actually, they are very misled. We were all born imperfect, with sinful natures—yet loved by God who offers us forgiveness and wholeness through faith in His Son, Jesus Christ. Homosexuality is defined by God as sin, an abomination to Him. There's one 'conversion therapy' that works for all sin, and that is asking Jesus Christ to come into our hearts." He quoted the Bible "Therefore, if anyone is in Christ, he is a new creation. The old has passed away; behold, the new has come (2 Cor. 5:17)."

=== Buttigieg tweets ===
After South Bend, Indiana mayor Pete Buttigieg became the first openly gay man to announce a run for the 2020 Democratic nomination for President against President Donald Trump, Graham was accused of attacking Buttigieg for his homosexuality and marriage to another gay man in April 2019, tweeting "Mayor Buttigieg says he's a gay Christian. As a Christian I believe the Bible which defines homosexuality as sin, something to be repentant of, not something to be flaunted, praised or politicized. The Bible says marriage is between a man & a woman—not two men, not two women." The tweet was one of three in a thread.

The tweet was met with a strong negative response against Graham, much of which condemned Graham as a hypocrite for selective criticism of a Democratic candidate's perceived wrongdoings while remaining silent on those perceived of the incumbent Republican. MSNBC host Joe Scarborough denounced Graham on his Morning Joe program, saying, "Just shut up Franklin Graham! You are a disgrace! You are a disgrace for normalizing Donald Trump's behavior." The Washington Post columnist Jennifer Rubin rebuked Graham as a "hypocritical bigot" who "has rationalized Trump's infidelity and racism, ignored his lies, cheered his inhumane immigration policy and behaved as a political hack rather than a religious leader", also writing "Buttigieg gets the benefit of being attacked by a right-winger whom progressives revile, gets to underscore a message of generational change and acceptance and gets to demonstrate what a class act he is. The other candidates must be wondering why some GOP hatemonger doesn't attack them." Opinion pieces in the National Review, The Charlotte Observer, and The Arizona Republic were also critical of Graham's comments.

=== UK tour 2020 and 2022 ===
All venues booked for Franklin Graham's planned eight-city 2020 UK tour cancelled his booking after protests by LGBTQ+ activists, petitions and requests from local councils. Mayor of Liverpool, Joe Anderson, stated Liverpool is proud of its LGBT+ community and would challenge hatred and intolerance. Graham's organisation said it would seek other venues. Many opponents said statements Graham had made were incompatible with their values, and that his appearance would be divisive, could be disruptive, or lead to a breach of the peace. After threatening legal action for breach of contract and giving assurances to venues that his preaching would not be discriminatory, Graham's tour was rescheduled for mid-2022.

=== Blackpool bus advertisements ===
In 2018, Blackpool Borough Council and Blackpool Transport Services removed advertisements for Franklin Graham's Lancashire Festival of Hope from local buses following complaints about his past comments on Islam and same-sex marriage. The advertisements, which simply stated "Time for Hope", were taken down due to concerns that Graham's presence might incite hatred. The Billy Graham Evangelistic Association UK (BGEA UK) took legal action against the council, arguing that the removal of the ads constituted religious discrimination and a violation of freedom of expression.

After a long legal battle, in April 2021, Judge Claire Evans ruled in favor of BGEA UK, stating that Blackpool Council had breached human rights laws by removing the advertisements. The ruling emphasized that the UK Human Rights Act (1998) and the Equality Act (2010) protect religious expression, even when views may be controversial. In her judgment, Evans criticized Blackpool officials for displaying "a wholesale disregard for the right to freedom of expression", siding with one part of the community while suppressing the rights of another. She affirmed that a pluralistic society must tolerate differing beliefs, including religious views on marriage and sexuality.

As a result of the ruling, Blackpool Council was ordered to pay £109,000 in damages and legal fees to BGEA UK and issue a formal public apology. The council acknowledged its mistake, stating that it had not adequately considered the impact on the religious community and admitted that the advertisements themselves "were not offensive". Graham called the ruling "a victory for every Christian".

== Awards and honors ==
In 2005, TIME magazine recognized Franklin Graham as one of the most influential evangelicals in the United States ("The 25 most influential evangelicals in America"). Graham was also inducted into the Hall of Faith by the Southern Baptist Evangelists.

=== Honorary doctorates ===
- 1988: Toccoa Falls College
- 2000: LeTourneau University
- 2002: Whitworth College
- 2023: Liberty University

=== Other honors ===
- 1996: The Salvation Army's William Booth Award by the Southern California Division
- 1999: The News & Observer's Tar Heel of the Year, an honor given to North Carolinians for their contributions to the state and beyond.
- 2002: WORLD magazine named him Daniel of the Year.
- 2014: Watchman Award from the Family Research Council
- 2023: The Italian Senate in Rome recognized the lifesaving work of Samaritan's Purse in Italy's Lombardy region when it was the deadly epicenter of the COVID-19 pandemic
- 2025: Order of Prince Yaroslav the Wise II degree, awarded by the President of Ukraine on August 23, 2025

== Personal life ==
Graham married Jane Austin Cunningham of Smithfield, North Carolina, on 14 August 1974. Their wedding ceremony was officiated by Billy Graham, Franklin's father. They have four children: William Franklin Graham IV (Will), born in 1975, Roy Austin Graham (b. 1977), Edward Bell Graham (b. 1979) and Jane Austin “Cissie” Graham Lynch (b. 1986). Graham and his wife have thirteen grandchildren. He now lives in the mountains of Boone, North Carolina, with his wife.

Graham underwent heart surgery in November 2021, to treat constrictive pericarditis.

== Works ==
Franklin Graham is editor-in-chief of BGEA's Decision magazine, founded by his father in 1960. Graham has own column in the journal.

=== Books ===
- Bob Pierce: This One Thing I Do (1983), with Jeanette Lockerbi
- Rebel With A Cause: Finally Comfortable Being Graham (1995), autobiography
- Miracle in a Shoe Box (1995), with Estelle Condra
- Living Beyond the Limits: A Life in Sync with God (1998)
- The Name (2002)
- It's Who You Know: The One Relationship That Makes All the Difference (2002)
- Kids Praying for Kids (2003)
- Operation Christmas Child: A Story of Simple Gifts (2003), with Donna Lee Toney
- All for Jesus (2003), with Ross Rhoads
- A Wing and a Prayer (2005), with Kevin Burke
- Billy graham in quotes (2011), with Donna Lee Toney
- The Sower. Worthy Publishing. 2012. ISBN 9781617951114.
- Rocks, Dirty Birds, and Briars (2016), with Donna Lee Toney
- Through My Father's Eyes (2018), with Donna Lee Toney
- The Greatest Rescue Mission (2021)
- A Biblical Perspective on Elections (2022)

=== Movies ===
Franklin Graham has become a producer of several TV movies on evangelism and Billy Graham.

- Light in the Darkness (2021)
- Storms in Latin America (2021)
- The Legacy of the Gospel (2021)
- Change: Needing More (2020)
- Persecution& the Gospel (2020)
- When the World is Shaken (2020)
- The Cost of Christmas (2019)
- Sowing in the Land Down Under (2019)
- Rediscovering Christmas (2018)
- The Message Lives On (2018)
- Vietnam: Rising Hope (2018)
- Return to the Holy Land (2018)
- Canvas Cathedral: Billy Graham's Crisis of Faith (2018)
- Billy Graham: A Life Remembered (2018)
- Flying Blind (2017)
- Facing Darkness (2017)
- Footprints of a Pilgrim (2016)
- Worth of a Soul (2016)
- Decisions (2016)
- Louis Zamperini: Captured by Grace (2015)
- Second Chance (2015)
- Value of a Soul (2015)
- Heaven (2014)
- 7 Day in the Holy Land (2014)
- Defining Moments (2013)
- The Cross (2013)
- Lose to Gain (2013)

Religious titles
Preceded by Robert Pierce	President of Samaritan's Purse; 1979–present	Incumbent
Preceded by Billy Graham	President of Billy Graham Evangelistic Association; 2001–present	Incumbent
