= Tchividjian =

The Armenian surname Tchividjian (Armenian: Չիվիճեան, derived from Turkish çivici [çivi "nail" + ci "agentive/profession suffix"], meaning "nail maker/seller"), also spelled as Chivijian, etc., may refer to:

- Basyle "Boz" Tchividjian, a founder of the Godly Response to Abuse in the Christian Environment organization
- Tullian Tchividjian, Presbyterian pastor and Christian author
