= Gigi Graham =

American Christian author and speaker

Gigi (or GiGi) Graham
- Born: Virginia Leftwich Graham; 21 September 1945 (age 81); Montreat, North Carolina, U.S.
- Education: Mary Baldwin College
- Occupations: Speaker, author, evangelist
- Spouse(s): Stephan Tchividjian (d. 2010); Chad Foreman; Jim Wilson (2012-)
- Children: 7
- Relatives: parents Billy Graham and Ruth Bell Graham; siblings Anne, Ruth Bell, Franklin (William Franklin III), and Nelson Edman (Ned).
- Writing career
- Period: 1978–present
- Genre: Christian non-fiction
- Notable works: A Quiet Knowing (W Publishing, 2001), Currents of the Heart (Multnomah Publishers, 1996), Passing It On (Word Publishing, 1993).

Virginia Leftwich “Gigi” Graham Tchividjian, also known as Virginia Leftwich “Gigi” Graham Foreman (born September 21, 1945), the eldest child of the late Billy Graham and the late Ruth Bell Graham, is an American Christian author with more than 10 published books, who has, in addition, a developed "speaking... ministry". Her book-length writings include several coauthored by Ruth Bell Graham.

== Early life and education ==
Virginia Leftwich Graham was born in 1945, in Montreat, North Carolina on September 21 of that year, to Billy and Ruth Bell Graham. In addition to Gigi, the Grahams had four more children: Anne, Ruth Bell, Franklin (William Franklin III), and Nelson Edman (Ned).

Just prior to her thirteenth birthday, Gigi left to attend a boarding school, Hampden DuBose Academy, in Zellwood, Florida, where Billy Graham's close friends and colleagues, the brothers T.W. and Grady Wilson, had sent their children (and where one of Gigi's best friend was going). After four years, there Gigi returned home, but soon transitioned to begin college, at Wheaton College, in Wheaton, Illinois, which she began, with boyfriend Jim Wilson (son of T.W.), shortly after her seventeenth birthday.

In that same year (1962), Stephan Tchividjian, son of a wealthy Swiss-Armenian convert to Christianity from Montreaux, Switzerland, who supported Billy Grahams ministry and had hosted the Graham family in the summer of 1960, reached out to Billy and Ruth Graham family, seeking their permission to be in contact with their daughter, with a proposal for marriage. (Seven years her senior, and thinking it "unseemely to approach a girl so young", Tchividjian had for some time "hesitated making direct contact".) Gigi's parents delayed communicating the proposal until the Christmas holidays of that year, leading to Gigi's insistence that she be allowed to meet with Stephan, which led to his invitation to join the Graham's for Christmas; after a time which she described as "days either on my knees or sitting in my window seat... seeking God's direction", she concluded that "the Lord has told me to say yes", and arranged, to the surprise of Stephan, in accommodation with the elder Graham's ministry schedule, to be married the following May, in Switzerland.

In addition to having attended Wheaton College, she is reported to have attended Mary Baldwin College. Sometime after their wedding, Stephan and Gigi returned to the United States.

== Career ==
After leaving Switzerland for America, and in the course of having and raising her children (see following), Gigi, then married to Stephan Tchividjian, began writing out her thoughts during a period of depression, "on scraps of paper between household tasks". This began a process that culminated in her completing more than 10 books (see following), and her "develop[ing] an inspirational speaking and writing ministry". She began writing down her personal experiences, which later grew into a career of sharing stories from different life backgrounds. She used her early notes to create a collection and organized her work around themes like personal struggle and faith.

== Personal life ==
Graham was married to the late Stephan Tchividjian, with whom she had seven children: Stephan, Berdjette (now Berdjette Barker), Basyle ("Boz"), Tullian, Aram, Jerushah (now Jerushah Duford), and Antony. She and Stephan later divorced, which was followed by a second marriage and divorce, and then, in 2012, to a renewed relationship and marriage to Jim Wilson, whom she had originally dated before and in her first year at Wheaton College.

=== Controversy ===
On July 1, 2005, Virginia Graham Foreman was arrested and charged with misdemeanor domestic abuse in an incident involving her husband, Chad Foreman; she was released on her own recognizance the following day. Following a legal case, she was placed on one year’s probation and ordered to complete a domestic violence evaluation, complete doctor-recommended treatment/ counselling and pay $100 for prosecution costs; she was also barred from possessing a weapon.

== Published works ==
The following is a list of books published by Gigi Graham (under that and other names):

- Tchividjian, Gigi (1979). Thank You, Lord, for My Home. Minneapolis MN: World Wide Publications. ISBN 9780890660232.
- Tchividjian, Stephan; Tchividjian, Gigi (1981). Our Search for Serenity. Minneapolis MN: World Wide Publications. Note, the presented weblink confounds this volume- showing a thumbnail of its cover, which makes clear the two authors and the publisher - with Gigi Tchividjian's A Woman's Quest for Serenity (see following). For a 1983 edition presenting Stephan Tchividjian as sole author of this work, see this link.
- Tchividjian, Gigi Graham (1982). A Woman's Quest for Serenity. Ada, MI: Revell. ISBN 9780800751029. Note, at Google Books, the cover/title page thumbnail image for this book confounds it with the preceding work, having Stephan Tchividjian as a coauthor.
- ——— (1984). Sincerely - Gigi. Contemporary Evangelical Perspectives. Grand Rapids, MI: Daybreak Books-Zondervan. ISBN 9780310448501.
- Diapers and Dishes or Pinstripes and Pumps: Christian Women in a Changing World
- (1991) Weather of the Heart: Glimpses of God in Sunlight and Storm ISBN 0-88-070447-0.
- (1992) Passing It on: Four Generations of Graham Traditions ISBN 1-56-977500-1.
- (1992) Marriage: Questions Women Ask.
- (1993) A Search for Serenity: Encouragement for Your Weary Days ISBN 0-80-108908-5.
- (1996) Currents of the Heart: Glimpses of God in the Stream of Life ISBN 1-56-977500-1.
- (1997) Coffee and Conversation With Ruth Bell Graham and Gigi Graham Tchividjian ISBN 1-56-955041-7.
- (1998) Mothers Together with Ruth Bell Graham ISBN 0-80-101166-3.
- (2000) Weatherproof Your Heart ISBN 0-80-078673-4.
- (2001) For Women Only: Keeping Your Balance in a Changing World ISBN 0-80-106360-4.
- (2005) A Quiet Knowing with Ruth Bell Graham ISBN 08-49-90608-3.
- (2008) Prodigal and Those Who Love Them: Word of Encouragement for Those Who Wait with Ruth Bell Graham ISBN 0-80-107155-0.
