= Pyongyang Foreigners School =

School in Pyongyang, North Korea

Coordinates: 39°1′25″N 125°47′29″E

Pyongyang Korean School for Foreigners
- 평양외국인학교
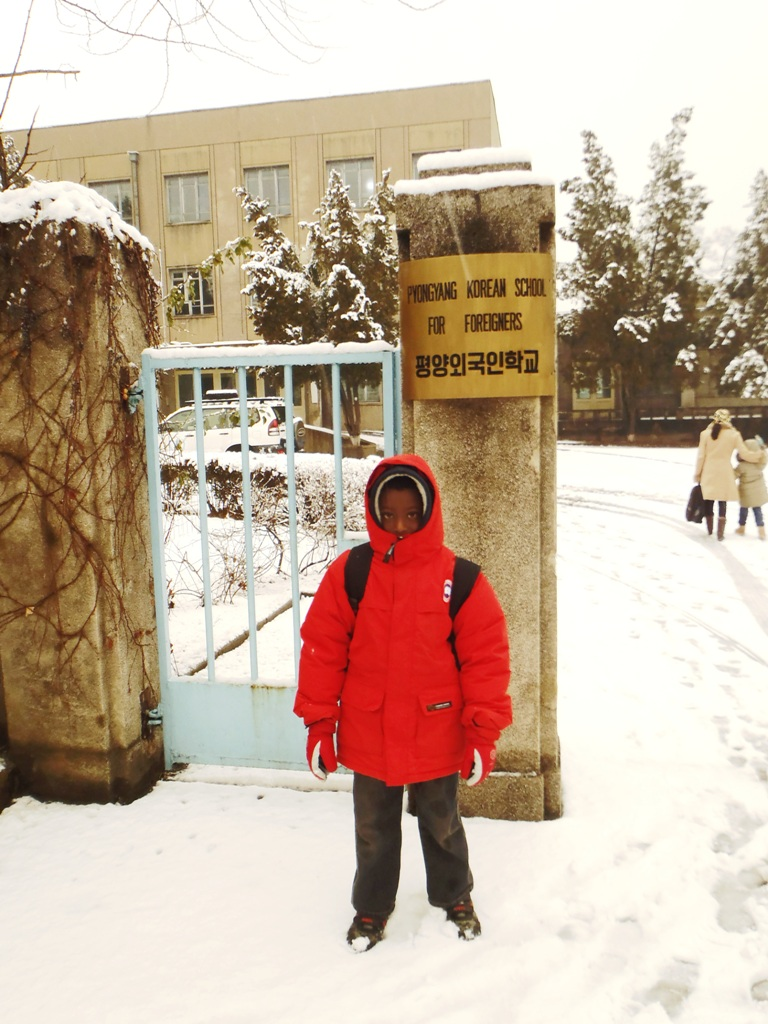
- Pyongyang Korean School for Foreigners 2012
- Students: c.40-50
- Location: Pyongyang, Democratic People's Republic of Korea
- Language: English

- Pyongyang Foreigners School
- Chosŏn'gŭl: 평양외국인학교
- Hancha: 平壤外國人學校
- Revised Romanization: Pyeongyang Oegugin Hakgyo
- McCune–Reischauer: P'yŏngyang Oegugin Hakkyo

The Pyongyang Korean School for Foreigners (Korean: 평양외국인학교) is a primary school in Pyongyang, North Korea, exclusively for foreign children. It has also a facility for foreign children studying on secondary school level. The school is located at the Munsudong diplomatic compound in Pyongyang, the capital of the DPRK. The children who attend are mainly dependents of the diplomatic community and the United Nations agencies in the country, although also children of foreign businessmen, mainly Chinese, have been joining the school. All teachers are Korean. The language of instruction is English. Local textbooks in English are used. English and mathematics are the two major subjects, with Korean language, music, art and physical education as minor subjects; from class 3 onwards also science is provided as minor subject. In the early 1990s the official name in English of the school was "Pyongyang Foreigners School", which is the straight translation of the name of the school in Korean (평양외국인학교), which did not change.

== History ==
=== Pre-DPRK history ===
A school with the same name in Korean, but the English language name "Pyeng Yang Foreign School" operated as an American Presbyterian mission school (founded in 1900), and was closed in 1940 with the greater militarization of Korea and antagonistic attitude towards foreigners by the then Japanese government. The missionary faculties involved continued their legacy from 1958 in another missionary school called Taejon Christian International School. Mrs. Ruth Bell Graham, wife of evangelist Billy Graham, attended the Pyeng Yang Foreign School in the 1930s. The buildings of this school were destroyed during the Korean War, and the site was used to build the Embassy of the Soviet Union, the present Russian Embassy complex. The Russian Embassy also includes a Russian school open for all foreign children of the diplomatic community, with Russian as the language of instruction. As 2025, Russian school in Pyongyang had 25 students and 10 teachers (all are Russian citizens).

=== Recent history ===
Between 1991 and 2015, the school doubled in size. As of 2015, the school had around 40-50 students.

The school follows the North Korean curriculum.
