= Billy Graham Library =

Religious museum in North Carolina, US

Coordinates: 35.1905516°N 80.9093017°W

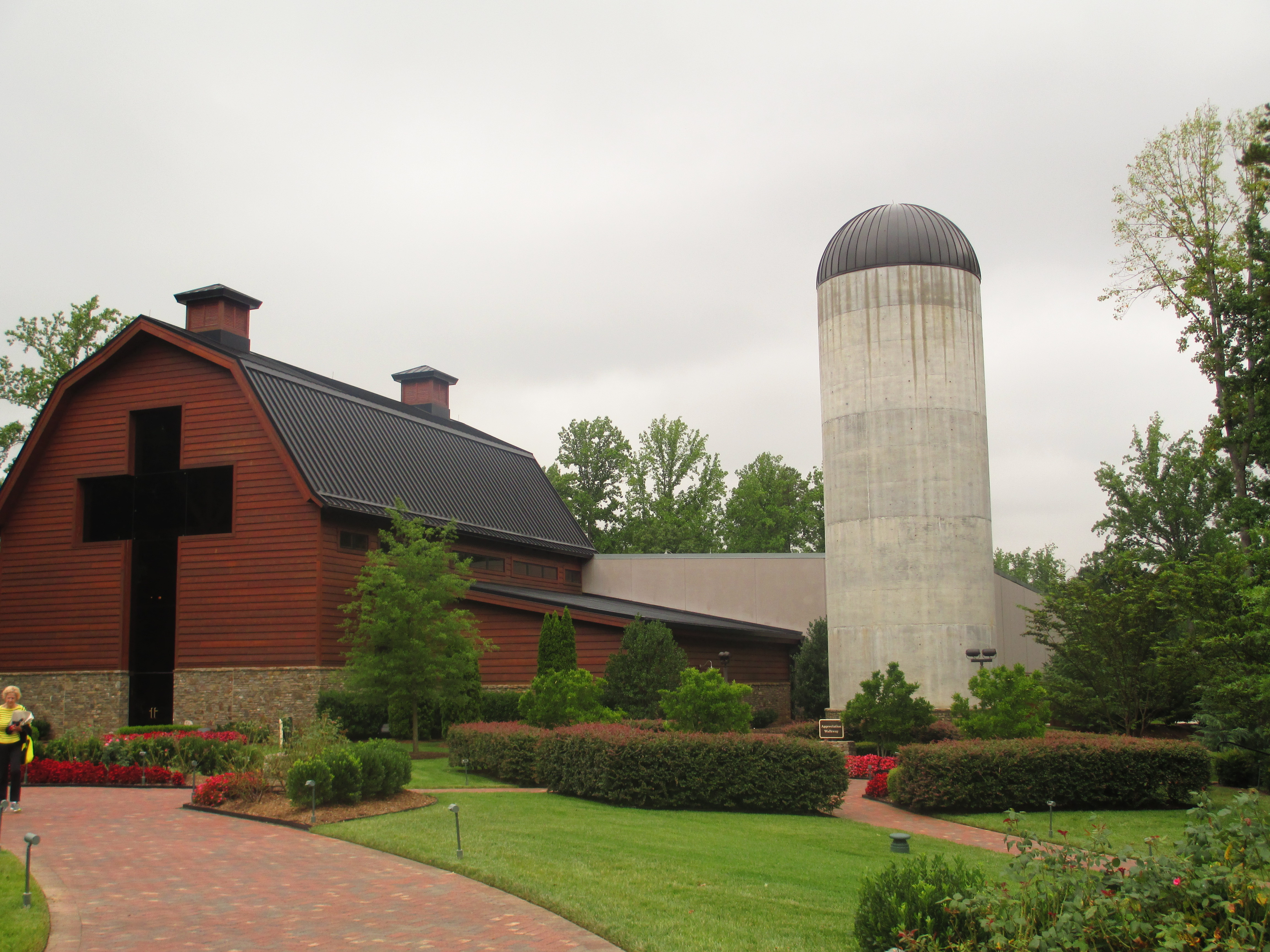
The Billy Graham Library is shaped like a dairy barn, with a silo to the right

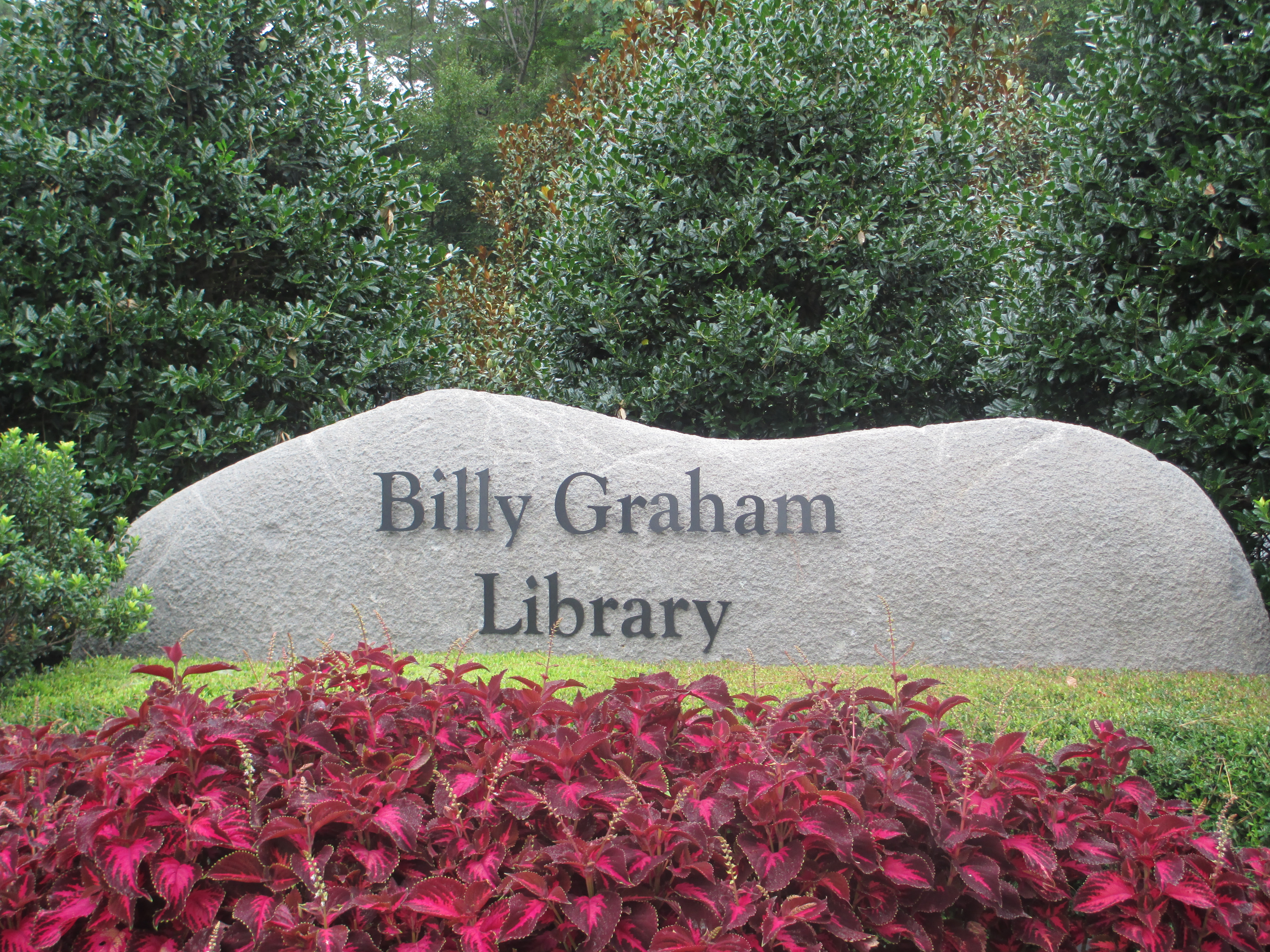
Entrance to the library from the Billy Graham Parkway in Charlotte, North Carolina

The Billy Graham Library is a public museum and library documenting the life and ministry of Christian evangelist Billy Graham. The 40,000-square-foot (3,700 m^{2}) complex opened to the public on June 5, 2007. The library is located on the grounds of the international headquarters of the Billy Graham Evangelistic Association in Charlotte, North Carolina, a few miles from where Graham was reared. The library is styled after a dairy barn, with a mechanical "talking" cow, to reflect Graham's farm-based childhood.

== Exhibits ==
The main galleries within the library showcase numerous presentations, pictures, music, artifacts, and voices from throughout Graham's ministry. One gallery is entirely devoted to Ruth Bell Graham, the wife of the evangelist. There is a dairy bar café and bookstore called "Ruth's Attic." All visitors enter the Library through doors at the base of a 40-foot (12 m) glass cross. Also located on the Library grounds is the Memorial Prayer Garden, where Ruth Graham was buried on June 17, 2007.

== Memorial Prayer Garden ==
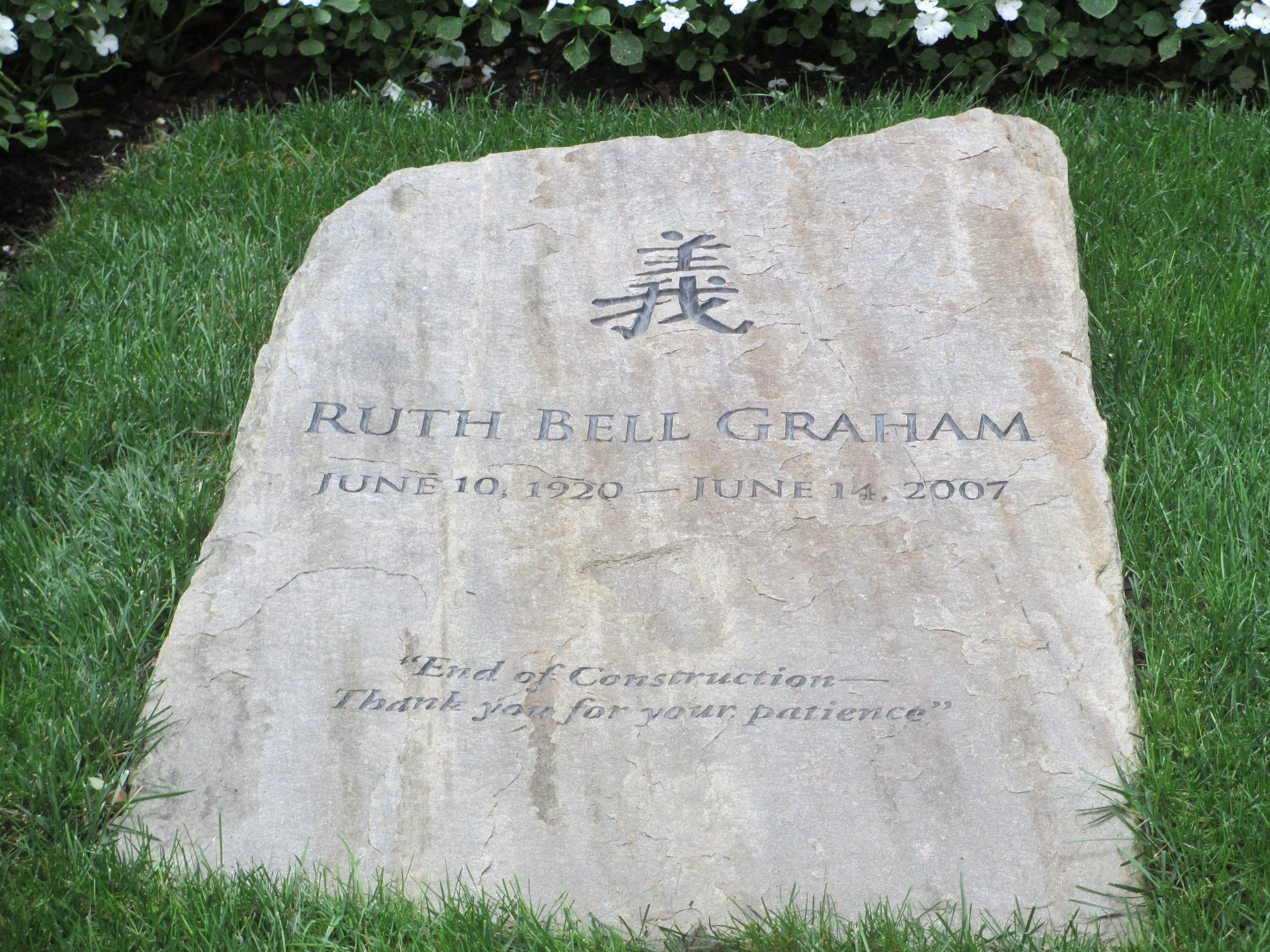
Gravestone of Ruth Bell Graham

Ruth Graham was initially opposed to being buried at the library, and instead preferred her home at the Billy Graham Training Center at the Cove near Asheville to be her final resting place until just before she died. In March 2009 Wilma "Billie" Barrows, the wife of Billy Graham's longtime Music Director Cliff Barrows, was interred on the Library grounds.

In April 2013, Gospel singer and Graham's regular featured soloist George Beverly Shea was interred there as well. Barrows was buried next to his wife on the grounds after his death in November 2016.

Graham's funeral following his February 21, 2018 death was conducted on March 2, 2018 in a tent, similar to the tents where he held his first crusades, on the grounds of the Library. Prior to the funeral, Graham had laid in repose in his childhood homeplace next to the library as well as lying in honor at the United States Capital in Washington, D.C. Following the funeral, Graham was buried next to his wife in the Library's Prayer Garden.

== Gallery ==
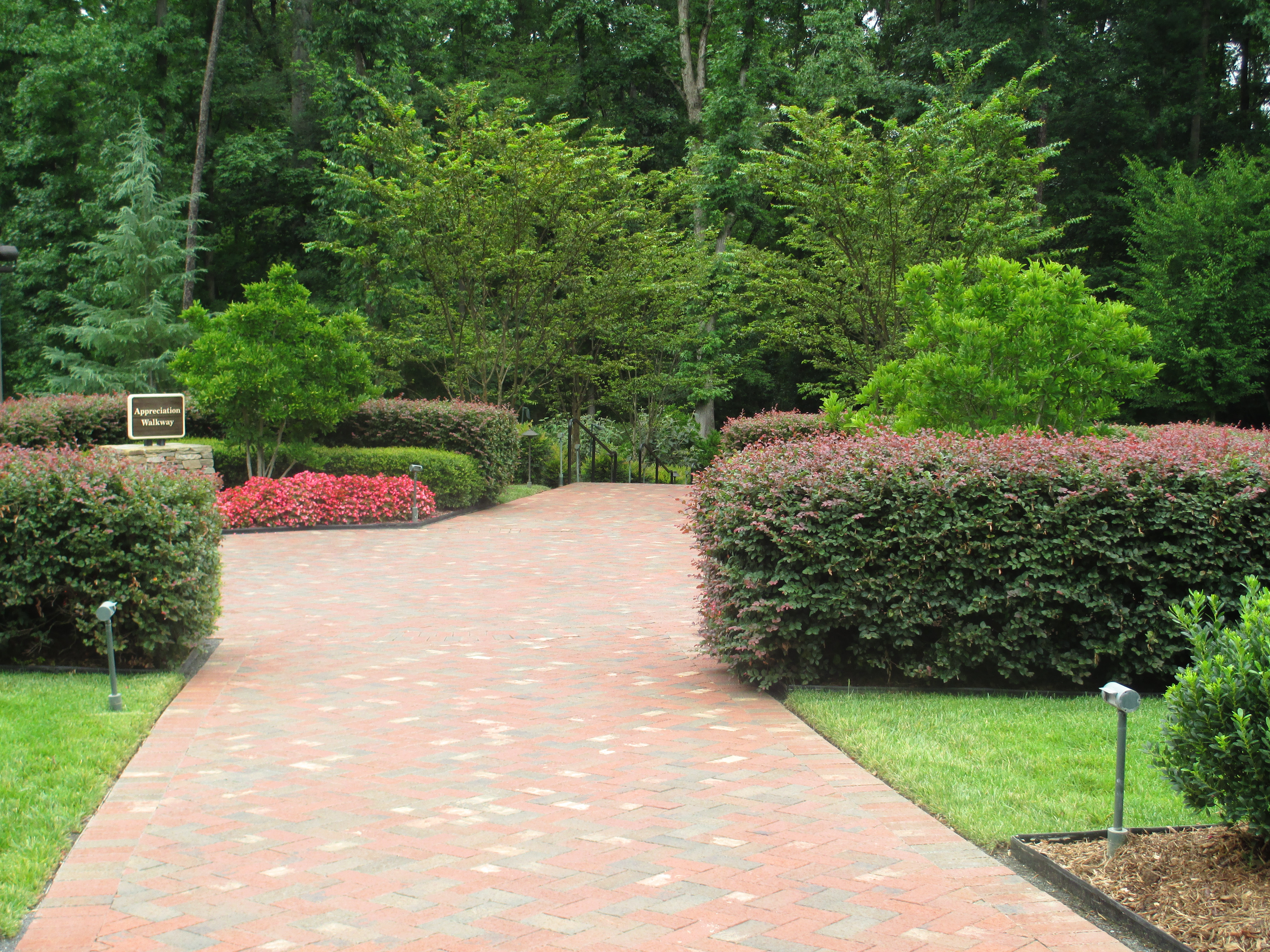
Appreciation Walkway at the Billy Graham Library leads to the graves of Billy Graham & Ruth Bell Graham

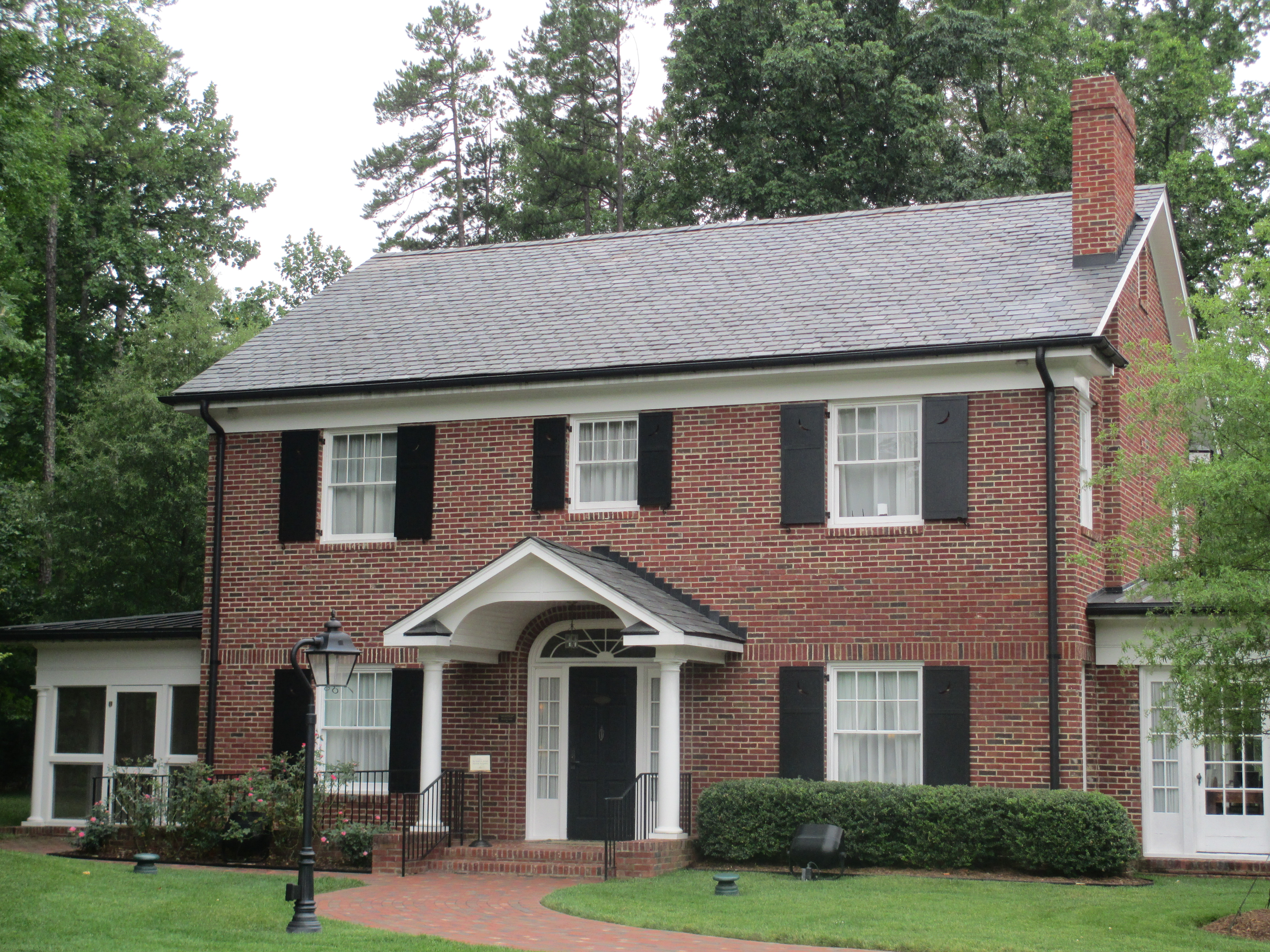
The home of Morrow Coffey Graham, the mother of Billy Graham, has been preserved at the Graham Library

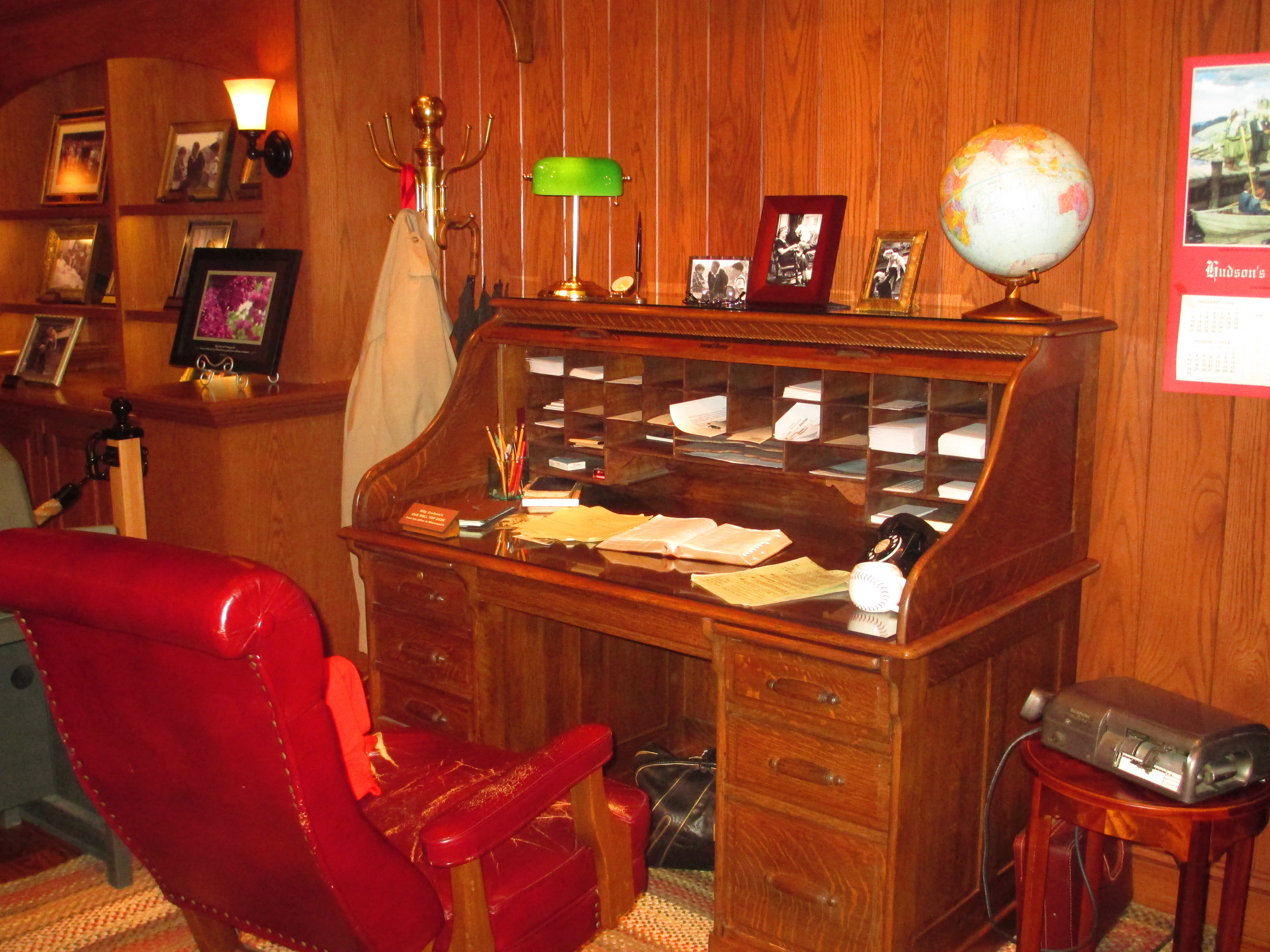
Replica of the desk of Billy Graham

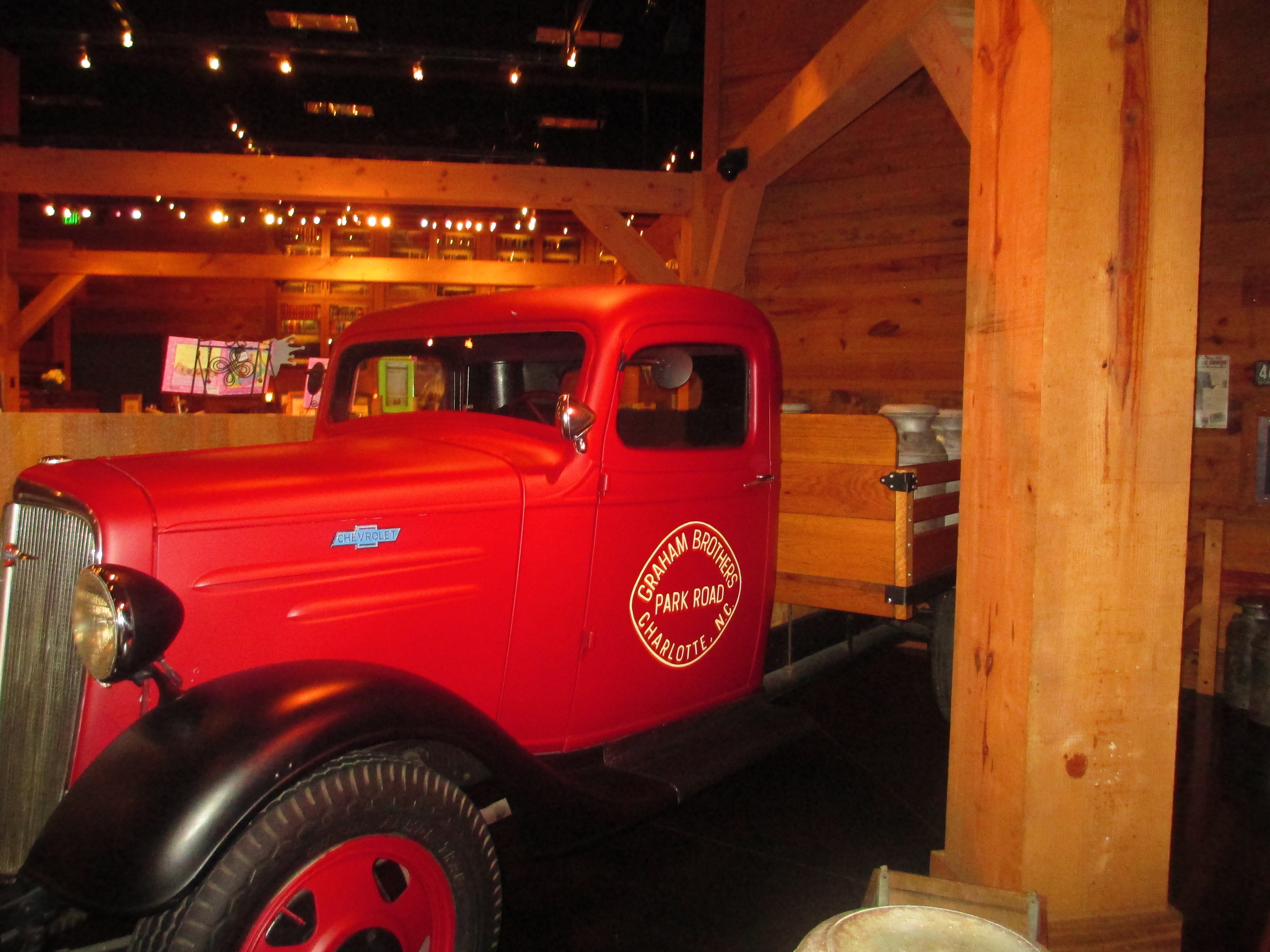
Model Graham Brothers Dairy truck on display at the Billy Graham Library

== See also ==
- List of Billy Graham's crusades
