= L. Nelson Bell =

American missionary (1894–1973)

- Medical missionary to China
- Born: Lemuel Nelson Bell; July 30, 1894; Longdale, Virginia, U.S.
- Died: August 2, 1973 (aged 79); Montreat, North Carolina, U.S.
- Spouse: Virginia Myers Leftwich
- Children: 5, including Ruth

Lemuel Nelson Bell (July 30, 1894 – August 2, 1973) was a medical missionary in China and the father-in-law of famous evangelist Billy Graham. Few people had more influence on Billy Graham than Bell.

== Life and work ==
Bell was born in Longdale, Virginia, the son of Ruth Lee (née McCue) and James Harvey Bell. Bell and his wife, Virginia Myers (née Leftwich) Bell, served as Presbyterian medical missionaries in China from 1916 to 1941 with the American Southern Presbyterian Mission. They lived on the compound of Love and Mercy Hospital in Qingjiangpu, Jiangsu Province, 300 miles north of Shanghai. They had five children: Rosa, Ruth, Lemuel, Virginia, and Clayton.

Bell kept a busy schedule as surgical chief and administrative superintendent at the hospital. Although the hospital had a pastor on staff, Bell made the healing of souls a priority in his work, gently explaining the Gospel to his patients. He never minimized the importance of addressing the spiritual needs of the people as well as their physical needs.

The Bells returned to the United States before Pearl Harbor in 1941 and retired in Montreat, North Carolina, across the street from their daughter Ruth and Billy Graham.

In 1942, Bell founded The Southern Presbyterian Journal, a publication which championed conservative Presbyterianism within the denomination that had sent Bell and his family to China as missionaries.

From 1942 to 1966, the Southern Presbyterian Journal also championed racial segregation. Historian Kenneth Taylor describes this segregationist stance:

Paternalistic Journalers professed to love African Americans and to want only the best for them. Integration, the writers insisted, was cruel, and segregation was kind. Thus, social separation was consistent with the Golden Rule, 'to do unto others as you want others to do unto you.' In 1947 Bell wrote without irony that he was 'ashamed at the intolerance, the discrimination, and the humiliations which have been heaped on them [blacks] by the white race' while he defended segregation. … Segregation was kind and Christian.

Bell considered himself a moderate with respect to segregation, primarily opposing force with respect to either segregation or integration. While he never fully embraced the Civil Rights Movement, his views changed considerably over the course of his life.

After Bell's death, and the subsequent founding of the Presbyterian Church in America, this publication would eventually evolve into the God's World News line of children's magazines, founded in 1981 under the direction of Joel Belz, and later lead to the 1986 founding of a parallel news publication for adults, WORLD Magazine.

Bell was also the one who suggested to Billy Graham the idea of the periodical that would eventually be named Christianity Today. He became its executive editor, commuting regularly to Washington from his home in Montreat and writing "A Layman and His Faith," a regular column in the magazine. With his son-in-law, he was extremely active in trying to mobilize evangelicals to support Richard Nixon against Roman Catholic John F. Kennedy for president in 1960. Bell received seven awards from the conservative Freedoms Foundation at Valley Forge, Pennsylvania for articles and editorials.

Nelson Bell died in Montreat, North Carolina.

Bell's biography is entitled, "A Foreign Devil in China: The Story of Dr. L. Nelson Bell," by John Charles Pollock.
