= Ruth Graham =

American author (1920–2007)

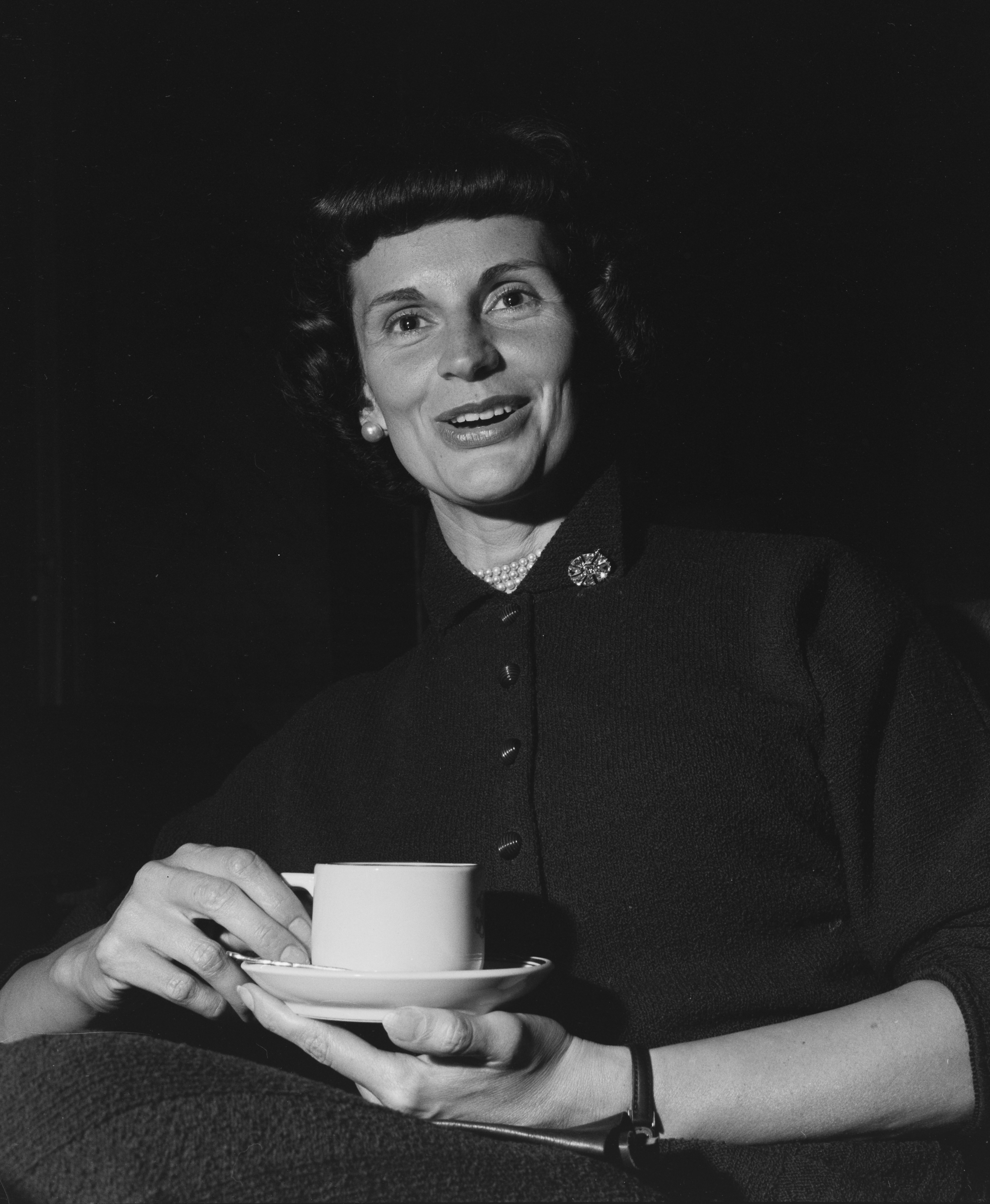
- Graham in 1955
- Born: Ruth McCue Bell; June 10, 1920; Qingjiang, Jiangsu, China
- Died: June 14, 2007 (aged 87); Montreat, North Carolina, U.S.
- Resting place: Billy Graham Library
- Other name: Ruth Bell Graham
- Occupations: Philanthropist, poet, author, painter
- Spouse: Billy Graham (m. 1943)
- Children: 5, including Gigi, Anne and Franklin
- Parent(s): L. Nelson Bell; Virginia Leftwich

Ruth McCue Bell Graham (June 10, 1920 – June 14, 2007) was an American Christian author. She was born in Qingjiang, Jiangsu, China, the second of five children. Her parents, Virginia Leftwich Bell and L. Nelson Bell, were medical missionaries at the Presbyterian Hospital 300 miles (480 km) north of Shanghai. At age 13 she was enrolled in Pyeng Yang Foreign School in Pyongyang, Korea, where she studied for three years. She completed her high school education at Montreat, North Carolina, while her parents were there on furlough. She graduated from Wheaton College in Wheaton, Illinois.

Ruth met her husband Billy Graham at Wheaton College. They were married in the summer of 1943, shortly after their graduation. Ruth Graham became a minister's wife for a brief period in Western Springs, Illinois. She lived out the rest of her life in Montreat, North Carolina. The Grahams have five children: Virginia (Gigi), Anne, Ruth, Franklin, and Nelson Edman (Ned), 19 grandchildren, and numerous great-grandchildren.

Graham wrote a number of books, including some co-authored with her daughter Gigi Graham.

== Early life ==
Ruth McCue Bell was born in Qingjiang, Jiangsu, China (now the main district of Huai'an, Jiangsu, China). Her parents, Virginia Myers (née Leftwich) and Dr. L. Nelson Bell, were American medical missionaries at the Presbyterian Hospital 300 miles north of Shanghai. She grew up in China in a deeply religious household.

Graham studied for three years at a high school in Pyongyang, now in North Korea, before graduating from a school in Montreat, North Carolina, while her parents were on furlough.

== Married life ==
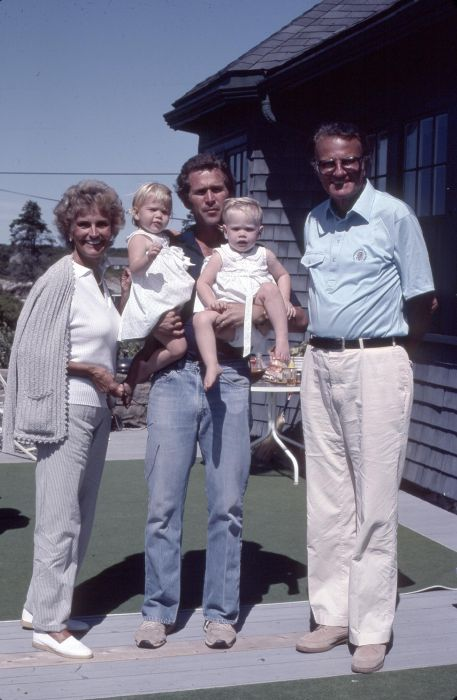
Graham (left) with her husband (right) and George W. Bush (middle) in 1983

Graham returned to the U.S. at the age of 17 in the fall of 1937, and enrolled at Wheaton College, outside Chicago, Illinois, where she met Billy Graham. They married on August 13, 1943. In 1945, after a brief stint as a suburban pastor, her husband became an evangelist for Youth for Christ. The Grahams moved to Montreat near her parents where the Grahams continued to live for the rest of their married life. Despite her husband being one of the world's most famous Baptists, Graham remained a Presbyterian and often taught Sunday School.

Between 1945 and 1958, Graham gave birth to five children, whom she raised – sometimes single-handedly – while her husband was away on extended national and international evangelistic crusades. Their three daughters and two sons are all actively involved in ministry, including eldest son Franklin, who heads the Billy Graham Evangelistic Association (BGEA) founded by his father.

== Ministry ==
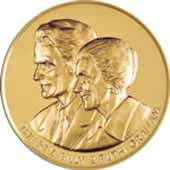
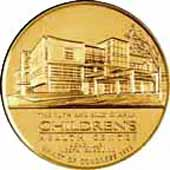
1996 Congressional Gold Medal coin shows Ruth and Billy Graham in profile (obverse); the Ruth and Billy Graham Children's Health Center in Asheville, North Carolina (reverse).

In 1959, Graham published her first book, Our Christmas Story, an illustrated volume for children. She went on to write or co-write 13 other books, many of them works of poetry she wrote as an emotional release while her husband was so often on the road through the years.

Graham was a vital part of Billy Graham's evangelistic career, and he turned to her for advice and input about many ministry decisions. One of the early uses of media by the BGEA was the "Hour of Decision" radio program begun in 1950, which she named. After her upbringing in China and high school experience in Korea, she continued to have compassion for the people of Asia. She encouraged her husband to visit and later accompanied him during his historic visits to the People's Republic of China.

Graham's significant role in her husband's ministry was recognized in 1996, when they were jointly awarded the Congressional Gold Medal in a special ceremony in the U.S. Capitol Rotunda in Washington, D.C.

== Philanthropy ==
In 1966, Graham founded the Ruth and Billy Graham Children's Health Center in Asheville, North Carolina, with which she was actively involved until her death.

== Declining health and death ==
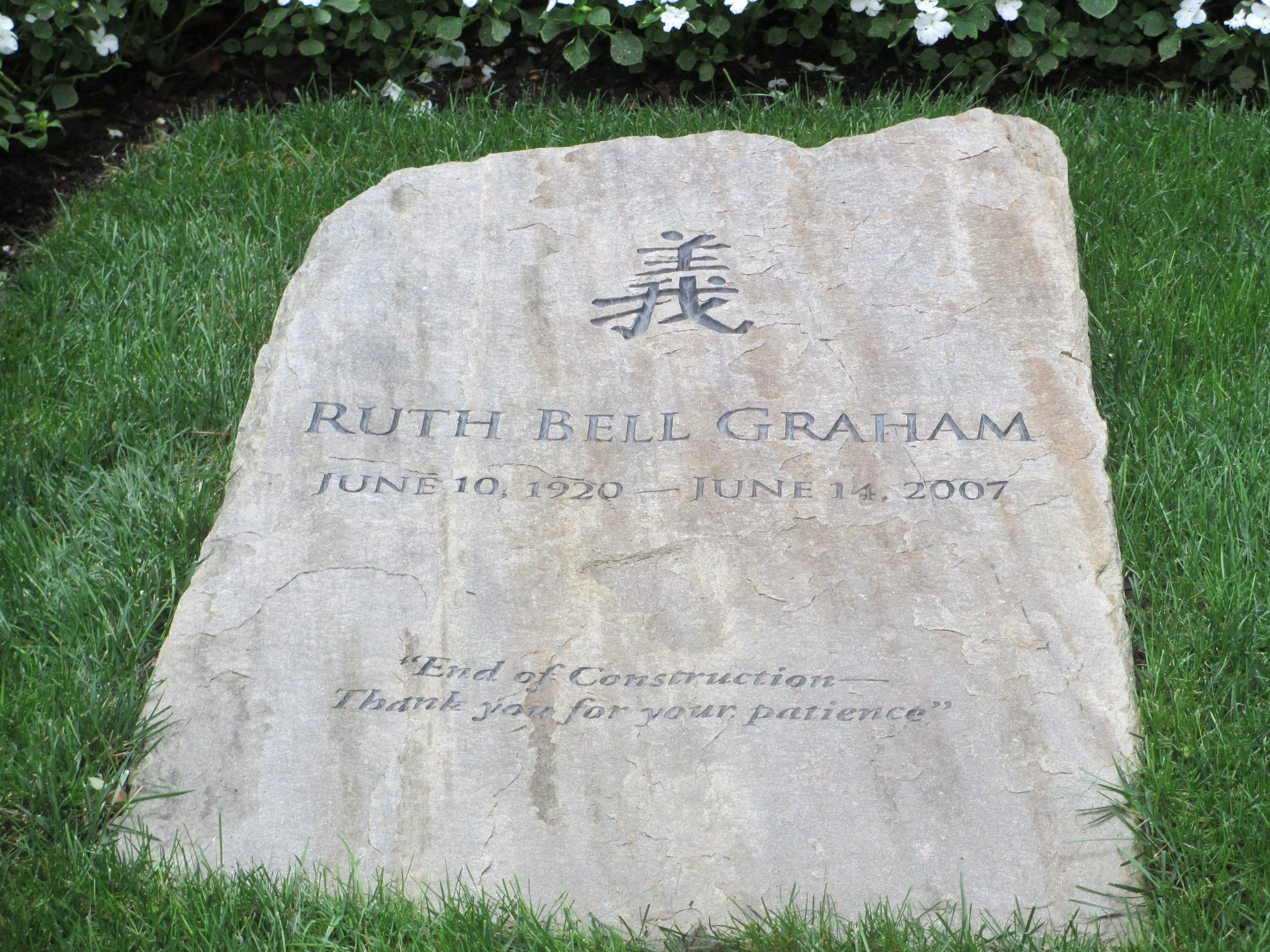
Ruth Graham gravestone at Billy Graham Library in Charlotte, North Carolina

Graham had been in frail health since suffering spinal meningitis in 1995. This was exacerbated by a degenerative osteoarthritis of the back and neck that began with a fall while testing a swing she made for her grandchildren in 1974 that resulted in chronic back pain for many years. During the final months of her life, she was bedridden and had contracted pneumonia.

The day before Ruth Graham's death, Billy Graham released a statement through the Billy Graham Evangelistic Association stating, "Ruth is my soul mate and best friend, and I cannot imagine living a single day without her by my side. I am more and more in love with her today than when we first met over 65 years ago as students at Wheaton College."

On Monday, June 11, at Graham's request and subsequent to consultation with her family, she was removed from life support. On June 13, 2007, following her decline into a semi-coma, her husband announced that he and his wife had decided to be buried beside each other at the Billy Graham Library in Charlotte, North Carolina. She died at 5:05 pm. EDT June 14, 2007, at the couple's home, Little Piney Cove, in Montreat, North Carolina, with her husband and five children at her bedside, four days after her 87th birthday. A private ceremony followed by burial on the grounds of the Billy Graham Library was held on Sunday, June 17, 2007.

In a statement released from Wheaton College, Duane Litfin, president of the school, remarked, "Strong, steady, and dauntless, Ruth Bell Graham was the glue that held many of the parts of their lives together."

== Bibliography ==
Graham was a poet and writer, authoring or co-authoring 14 books, as well as a regular contributor for newspapers and magazines.

- Our Christmas Story, 1959
- Family Bible Library, 1971 (Board of Editorial Advisors)
- Sitting by My Laughing Fire, 1977 (revised 2006)
- It's My Turn, 1982
- Legacy of a Pack Rat, 1989
- Prodigals and Those Who Love Them, 1991
- Clouds are the Dust of His Feet, 1992
- One Wintry Night, 1994
- Collected Poems, 1997
- Prayers from a Mother's Heart, 1999
- Footprints of a Pilgrim: The Life and Loves of Ruth Bell Graham, 2001
- Never Let It End: Poems of a Lifelong Love, 2001

With Gigi Graham:

- Coffee and Conversation With Ruth Bell Graham and Gigi Graham Tchividjian, 1997
- Mothers Together, 1998
- A Quiet Knowing, 2001

Her biography, A Time for Remembering (later reissued as Ruth: A Portrait), was an early work of novelist Patricia Cornwell.
