= Bible Study Fellowship =

Fellowship of lay people offering a system of structured Bible study

- Abbreviation: BSF
- Formation: 1959 in Oakland, California
- Type: Parachurch organization
- Purpose: "Bible education of people in the United States and throughout the world."
- Headquarters: San Antonio, Texas, USA
- Region served: Worldwide
- Executive Director: Hollie Roberts
- Budget: $13.9 million (fiscal year ending August 31, 2006)
- Website: http://www.bsfinternational.org/

Bible Study Fellowship (also known as BSF) is an international Christian interdenominational or parachurch fellowship of lay people offering a system of structured Bible study. It was founded in 1959 by Audrey Wetherell Johnson, a British evangelist to China.

== History ==
BSF grew out of a program of structured Bible study that A. Wetherell Johnson, a missionary with China Inland Mission, agreed to run for a group of friends in California in 1952. "In 1958, Ms. Johnson accepted an invitation to go to San Francisco to conduct Bible classes for the revival converts of Billy Graham's neo-evangelical crusades." BSF began in 1959.

Upon Johnson's retirement, Rosemary Jensen became executive director (ED) and served for nearly twenty years. In 2000, she began serving as the head of the Rafiki Foundation International which has since moved from San Antonio, TX to Eustis, FL and Mrs. Jean Nystrand assumed the position of ED. In 2009, Susie Rowan took over as executive director. In 2021, Susie Rowan retired and Hollie Roberts was appointed by the board to be the new executive director.

The sixty year old international organization was forced by the COVID19 pandemic to shift its thousands of Bible study meetings online which had just begun to shift towards technology in its marketing and study materials distribution.

== Countries ==
According to the organization's Form 990 for the year ending August 31, 2006, BSF has offices in the US, Australia, United Kingdom, Hong Kong, Kenya, and Singapore, and has a financial interest in the following 35 countries:

- Australia
- Belize
- Bermuda
- Brazil
- Canada
- China
- Ecuador
- United Kingdom
- France
- Ghana
- Hong Kong
- Hungary (Class closed in May 2007)
- India
- Indonesia
- Israel
- Japan
- Kenya
- Madagascar
- Malaysia
- Myanmar
- Netherlands
- New Zealand
- Nigeria
- Peru
- Philippines
- Singapore
- South Africa
- South Korea
- Switzerland
- Taiwan
- Tanzania
- Thailand
- USA
- Uganda
- Vietnam
- Zimbabwe

== Doctrinal positions and practices ==
BSF has a statement of faith to which all leaders must agree. It emphasizes salvation by grace through faith (Eph 2:8) while encouraging a holy (sanctified) lifestyle.

Any BSF participant who agrees to the BSF Statement of Faith, when that statement is not in conflict with the church they are a member of, can be called into leadership positions in BSF. BSF is careful not to call someone into leadership where the profession of their faith as a member of their church would be conflict with the BSF Statement of Faith.
