= Billy Graham Evangelistic Association =

Christian outreach organization

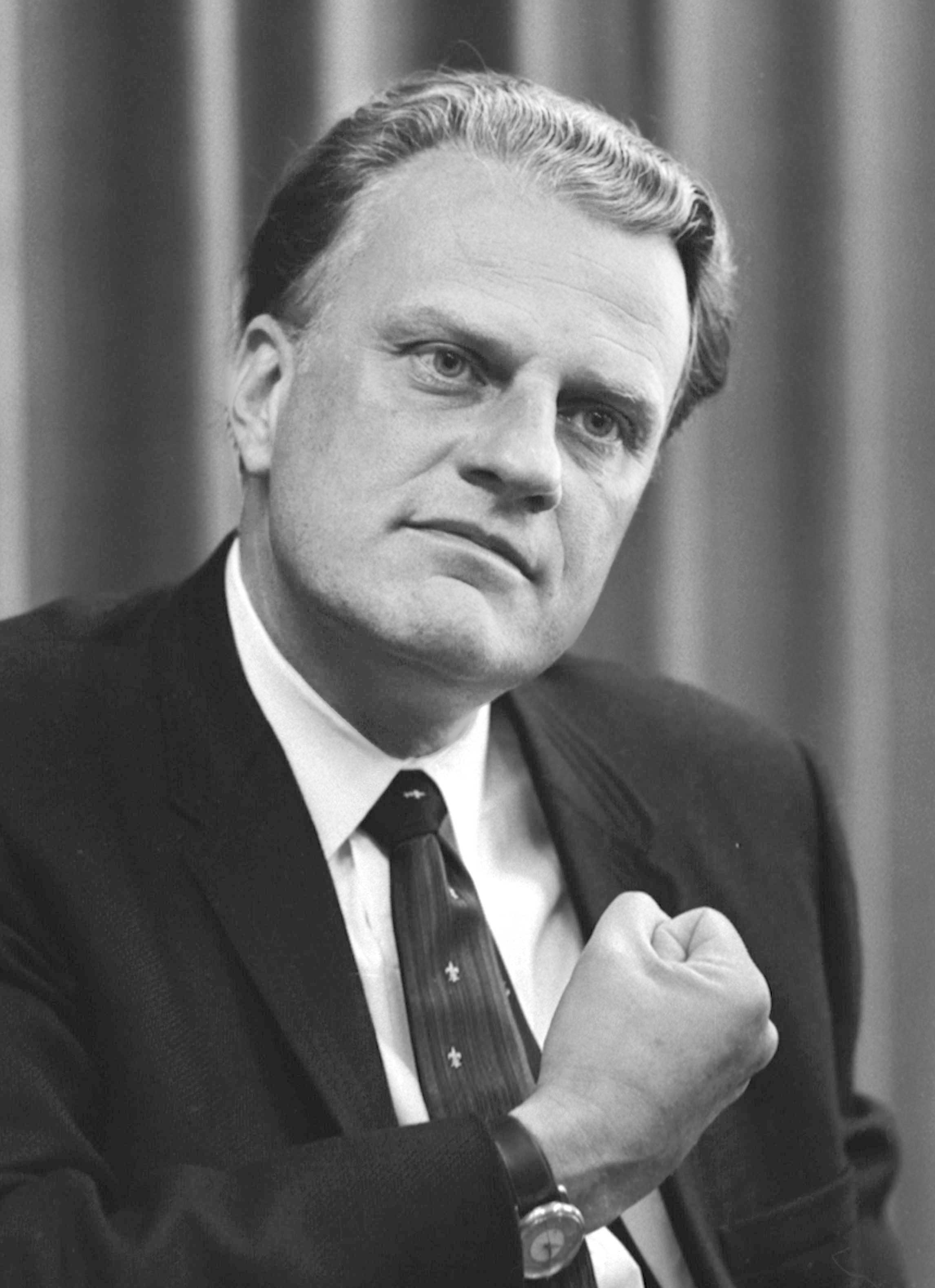
Founder Billy Graham in 1966, who led the organization from its founding in 1950 until 2001.

The Billy Graham Evangelistic Association (BGEA) is a non-profit Christian outreach organization that promotes multimedia evangelism, conducts evangelistic crusades, and engages in disaster response. The BGEA operates the Billy Graham Training Center in Asheville, North Carolina, and the Billy Graham Library in Charlotte, North Carolina.

== History ==
The organization was founded in 1950 by Billy Graham in Minneapolis, Minnesota; it later moved to Charlotte, North Carolina.

The organization broadcast the Hour of Decision radio show for more than sixty years. In August 2018, six months after Graham's death, the BGEA launched the Billy Graham Channel on SiriusXM to broadcast Graham's sermons.

Franklin Graham serves as president and CEO. Several times a year, he and his son, Will Graham, preach at evangelistic crusades modeled after those Billy Graham was known for holding.

The BGEA's internet evangelism ministry, Search for Jesus, was launched in 2011. The outreach is aimed at sharing the Christian gospel with people around the world through websites in multiple languages. More than 50 million people have visited the websites since 2011, according to the BGEA.

The organization produces a television special each month, which is broadcast on TV stations across the United States and posted online. The organization also publishes Decision magazine monthly.

The BGEA began an international evangelism project in 2002 called My Hope, in which Christians invite friends, neighbors, and relatives to their homes to watch a national telecast featuring Billy or Franklin Graham, translated into their language. BGEA claims that the project helped more than 9.8 million people "make decisions for Christ."

Billy Graham and his ministry were also instrumental in founding Christianity Today magazine, the Lausanne Committee for World Evangelization and the Internet Evangelism Coalition.

BGEA's Charlotte headquarters is the site of the Billy Graham Library, which was formally dedicated on May 31, 2007, with former U.S. Presidents Jimmy Carter, George H. W. Bush, and Bill Clinton in attendance. Former U.S. Presidents George W. Bush, Bill Clinton, and Donald Trump visited the Billy Graham Library to pay their respects following Billy Graham's death.

== See also ==
- List of Billy Graham's crusades
