= Montreat, North Carolina =

- Town
- Seal
- Motto: "A Place Set Apart"
- Location in Buncombe County and the state of North Carolina
- Coordinates: 35°38′52″N 82°18′09″W
- Country: United States
- State: North Carolina
- County: Buncombe

Area
  - Total: 2.73 sq mi (7.07 km^{2})
  - Land: 2.73 sq mi (7.06 km^{2})
  - Water: 0.0039 sq mi (0.01 km^{2})
- Elevation: 2,720 ft (830 m)

Population (2020)
  - Total: 901
  - Density: 330.3/sq mi (127.54/km^{2})
- Time zone: UTC-5 (Eastern (EST))
  - Summer (DST): UTC-4 (EDT)
- ZIP code: 28757
- Area code: 828
- FIPS code: 37-44100
- GNIS feature ID: 2406182
- Website: www.townofmontreat.org

View from the Lookout Mountain Overlook in Montreat, North Carolina

Montreat is a town in Buncombe County, North Carolina, United States. As of the 2020 census, Montreat had a population of 901. It is part of the Asheville metropolitan area. The town is best known for Montreat Conference Center and Montreat College, and for having been the home of the evangelist Billy Graham and his wife Ruth Bell Graham.

== History ==
The town of Montreat was incorporated in 1967. Much of the property in the area is still owned by the Mountain Retreat Association, formed in 1897 by John Collins, a Congregationalist minister from Connecticut. Funding for the retreat's creation was secured from candy manufacturer and philanthropist John S. Huyler, founder of Huyler's. The name of Montreat is a portmanteau of the words "Mountain" and "Retreat". In 1907, control of the Mountain Retreat Association (MRA) passed to the Presbyterian Church in the US, and for many years Montreat has been host to religious conferences, mainly Presbyterian, organized through the MRA. Woman's Auxiliary of the Presbyterian Church, U.S. was established in Montreat in 1912. Significant organizations in the contemporary town of Montreat, in addition to the Mountain Retreat Association, include Montreat Presbyterian Church: PC(USA), Montreat College (founded in 1916), and Christ Community Church, EPC (formerly Montreat Presbyterian Church).

In 2024, the town was severely damaged by Hurricane Helene.

== Geography ==
Montreat is located in eastern Buncombe County. Its eastern border is the county line, with McDowell County to the east. The town is located in the valley of Flat Creek and is surrounded by mountains on three sides. The only road access is via North Carolina Highway 9, which leads southwest 2 miles (3 km) to the town of Black Mountain.

According to the United States Census Bureau, Montreat has a total area of 2.7 square miles (7.1 km^{2}).

== Demographics ==
Historical population
Census	Pop.	Note	%±
1970	581		—
1980	741		27.5%
1990	693		−6.5%
2000	630		−9.1%
2010	723		14.8%
2020	901		24.6%
U.S. Decennial Census

=== 2020 census ===
Montreat racial composition
Race	Number	Percentage
White (non-Hispanic)	740	82.13%
Black or African American (non-Hispanic)	75	8.32%
Native American	3	0.33%
Asian	6	0.67%
Other/Mixed	10	1.11%
Hispanic or Latino	67	7.44%

As of the 2020 United States census, there were 901 people, 69 households, and 57 families residing in the town.

=== 2000 census ===
As of the census of 2000, there were 630 people, 185 households, and 98 families residing in the town. The population density was 227.3 inhabitants per square mile (87.8/km^{2}). There were 572 housing units at an average density of 206.3 per square mile (79.7/km^{2}). The racial makeup of the town was 95.40% White, 0.95% African American, 0.63% Native American, 0.63% Asian, 0.79% from other races, and 1.59% from two or more races. Hispanic or Latino of any race were 1.43% of the population.

There were 185 households, out of which 11.4% had children under the age of 18 living with them, 48.1% were married couples living together, 2.2% had a female householder with no husband present, and 47.0% were non-families. 37.3% of all households were made up of individuals, and 20.0% had someone living alone who was 65 years of age or older. The average household size was 2.16 and the average family size was 2.63.

In the town, the population was spread out, with 9.4% under the age of 18, 45.7% from 18 to 24, 10.3% from 25 to 44, 11.6% from 45 to 64, and 23.0% who were 65 years of age or older. The median age was 23 years. For every 100 females there were 102.6 males. For every 100 females age 18 and over, there were 101.8 males.

The median income for a household in the town was $45,625, and the median income for a family was $60,625. Males had a median income of $39,375 versus $22,292 for females. The per capita income for the town was $16,699. About 3.6% of families and 11.9% of the population were below the poverty line, including 7.8% of those under age 18 and 3.9% of those age 65 or over.

The town is the location of the main campus of Montreat College.
