= Anne Graham Lotz =

American evangelist (born 1948)

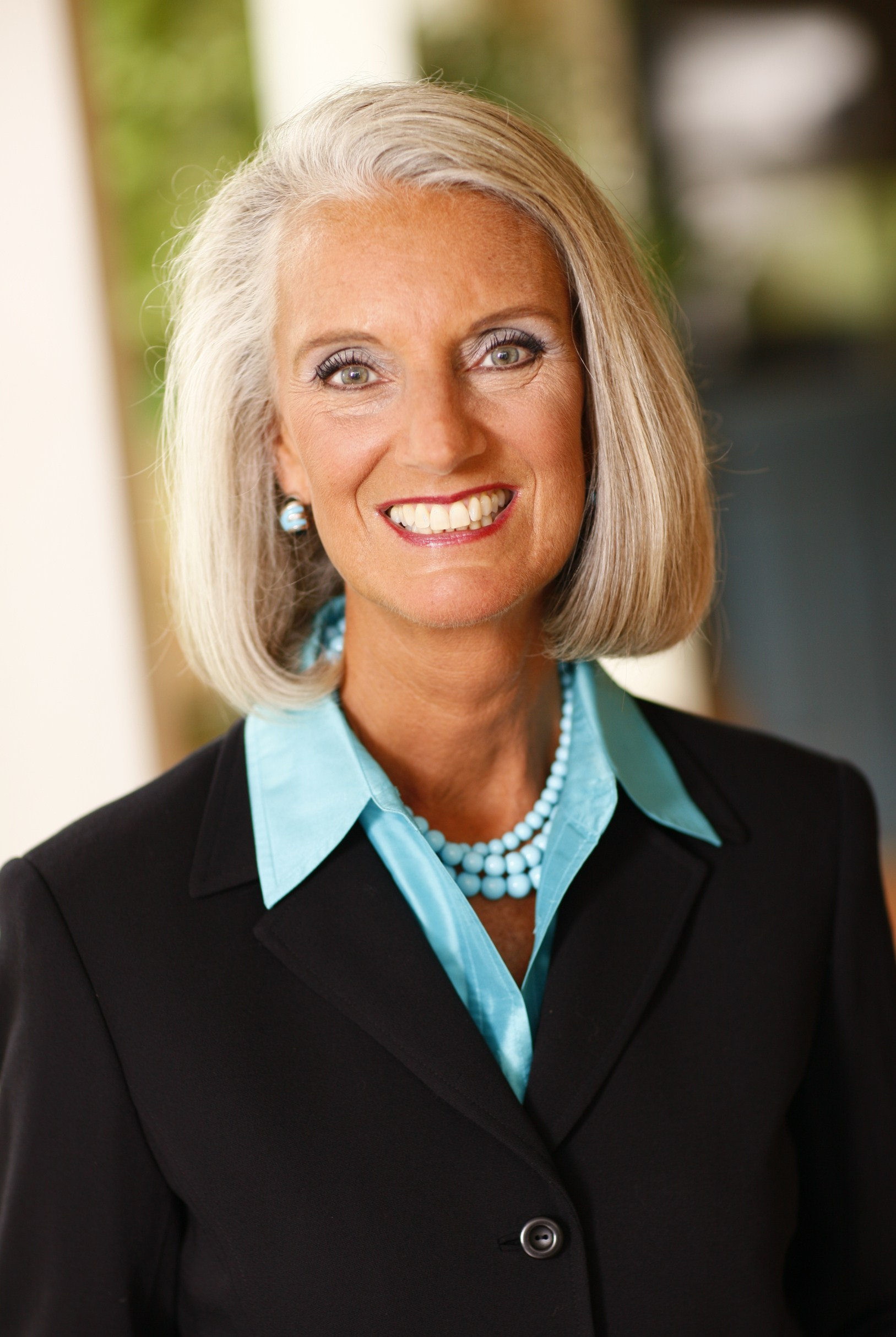
- Lotz in 2008
- Born: Anne Morrow Graham; May 21, 1948 (age 78); Asheville, North Carolina, U.S.
- Occupations: Evangelist, author
- Spouse: Danny Lotz (m. 1966; died 2015)
- Children: 3
- Parent(s): Billy Graham; Ruth Bell
- Website: www.annegrahamlotz.com

Anne Morrow Graham Lotz (born May 21, 1948) is an American evangelist. She is the second daughter of evangelist Billy Graham and his wife Ruth Graham. She founded AnGeL Ministries, and is the author of 11 books, of which her best known is Just Give Me Jesus.

== Early life ==
Lotz was born Anne Morrow Graham, in 1948 in Asheville, North Carolina. Lotz is the second of the five children born to Billy and Ruth Graham. The Graham Family had settled near Ruth's parents in Montreat in what remains today as the Graham Family Home, Little Piney Cove.

Ruth was often the single parent for months at a time to the five Graham children. Of her upbringing, Lotz says, "[My father] was away almost full time. I was raised pretty much by single parents and grandparents, and then I didn't know any different."

Lotz became a Christian at the age of about eight years old after watching The King of Kings, a Cecil B. DeMille film, on Good Friday.

Anne Graham graduated from high school and shortly thereafter, married Dr. Daniel Lotz on September 9, 1966, at the age of 18. The young couple lived in Raleigh, North Carolina, where Dr. Lotz was beginning his dental practice. She had her first child at the age of 20, with two more in the three years that followed, and she did not work outside her home. Lotz says this was a hard time in her life saying: “Early in my marriage, I felt like I drifted from God just because I was busy – you know, small children, small house, all the business of being a housewife. But I sought God through the Scripture. That’s when I got into the Bible myself.”

== Early ministry: Bible Study Fellowship ==
In 1975, Lotz heard about Bible Study Fellowship (BSF), a Bible class for women that used a highly structured study method, and wanted a class to be offered in her hometown of Raleigh. She waited for a year for someone else to teach the class, but when no one else did, she decided to teach the class herself. The class immediately filled up with 500 people and had a waiting list. Lotz continued to teach the weekly class for 12 years. During this time, she began to receive many speaking invitations and in 1988, Lotz left BSF for an itinerant teaching ministry.

== AnGeL Ministries ==
Upon leaving her BSF teaching class, Lotz founded AnGeL Ministries, a non-profit organization based in Raleigh, NC to undergird her ability to accept teaching invitations. Lotz says the name "AnGeL Ministries" takes her initials "AGL" and adds the "n" and "e" to form the word "AnGeL" because "angels in the Bible were messengers of God, and they went where God sent them and they give the message you put on their heart, and I felt that describes what I do."

In the early years of AnGeL Ministries, Lotz accepted invitations to speak all over the world: at pastor's conferences, at women's conferences, and world evangelism conferences. By the year 2000, she felt her ministry taking a different direction.

Although as a female evangelist she's encountered some resistance from conservative Protestants, her popularity is such that she draws large crowds across the world, and the New York Times in 1999 considered her one of the five most influential evangelists in the United States.

== Just Give Me Jesus revivals ==
In the late 1990s, though AnGeL Ministries was growing, Lotz's personal life became stressful. Within two years, a hurricane devastated their property, her husband's dental office burned to the ground, their son was diagnosed with cancer and went through major surgery and radiation, all three of her children got married within an eight-month period, and her mother's health was failing, requiring multiple hospitalizations. Once again, Lotz turned to her study of Scripture for comfort. This time, she immersed herself in the Gospel of John and from that study, came her book Just Give Me Jesus.

Having experienced personal renewal as the result of her study of John, Lotz felt called to begin offering Just Give Me Jesus revivals in major arenas, both domestically and internationally for women who seek inspiration in their walk with God. Though the revivals are aimed at teaching women, men are not turned away should they desire to come, and there is no admission charge for anyone.

== Publishing ==
In addition to her itinerant teaching ministry, Lotz is author to 11 books, including her signature book, Just Give Me Jesus. She also wrote The Vision of His Glory, God's Story, and My Heart's Cry. Other published works include Heaven: My Father’s House, Daily Light, Why?: Trusting God When You Don’t Understand, The Joy of My Heart, My Jesus Is…Everything, I Saw the Lord, and Life is Just Better…with Jesus. Additionally, she produces daily radio messages, Daily Light for Daily Living, that are heard on more than 700 outlets worldwide. Lotz's most recent works, The Magnificent Obsession: Embracing the God-filled Life, made its debut in August 2009 and Expecting to See Jesus: A Wake-Up Call for God's People in July 2011.

== Death of spouse ==
Lotz's husband, Daniel Lotz, 78, died on August 19, 2015. He was discovered unresponsive in their backyard swimming pool two weeks before their 49th anniversary.

== Awards ==
Lotz has been awarded four Gold Medallion Book Awards from the Evangelical Christian Publishers Association for excellence in Christian publications:

- The Vision of His Glory (1997)
- God’s Story (1998)
- Just Give Me Jesus (2001)
- My Heart’s Cry (2003)

== Controversy ==
She controversially stated that the September 11, 2001 attacks on the United States were God's punishment on the country for transgenderism, evolution, and secularism.
