= O. Palmer Robertson =

American theologian & academic (born 1937)

Owen Palmer Robertson (born August 31, 1937, in Jackson, Mississippi) is an American Christian theologian and biblical scholar. He taught at Reformed Theological Seminary, Westminster Theological Seminary, Covenant Theological Seminary, Knox Theological Seminary as well as at the African Bible Colleges of Malawi and Uganda. He also served as principal of the latter institution. Robertson was the first elected male SGA president of Belhaven College (now Belhaven University) in 1957.

Robertson is perhaps best known for his book The Christ of the Covenants. His definition of a biblical covenant being "a bond in blood, sovereignly administered" has been widely discussed.

Robertson lives in Winston-Salem, North Carolina with his wife, Joanna, where he is writing and working as head of Consummation Ministries.

In 2008, a Festschrift was published in his honor. The Hope Fulfilled: Essays in Honor of O. Palmer Robertson (ISBN 1596381159) included contributions by Bruce Waltke, Richard Gaffin, George W. Knight III, Simon J. Kistemaker, Robert L. Reymond, and Morton H. Smith.

== Publications ==
- The Christ of the covenants (1980)
- Covenants : God's way with his people (1987)
- Jonah : a study in compassion (1990)
- The final word : a biblical response to the case for tongues and prophecy today (1993)
- Prophet of the coming day of the Lord : the message of Joel (1995)
- Psalms in congregational celebration (1995)
- Understanding the land of the Bible : a biblical-theological guide (1996)
- The Genesis of sex : sexual relationships in the first book of the Bible (2002)
- The Israel of God : yesterday, today, and tomorrow (2000)
- The current justification controversy (2003)
- Coming home to God (2003)
- The Books of Nahum, Habakkuk, and Zephaniah (2005)
- The Christ of the prophets (2008)
- God's people in the wilderness : the church in Hebrews (2009)
- A way to pray : using the words of scripture to enrich prayer (2010)
- Preaching made practical (2015)
- The flow of the Psalms : discovering their structure and theology (2015)
- The Christ of wisdom : a redemptive-historical exploration of the Wisdom books of the Old Testament (2017)
- Christ of the consummation : a New Testament biblical theology (2022)
