= Michael A. Milton =

20th and 21st-century American minister, theologian, and singer-songwriter

The Reverend Michael A. Milton
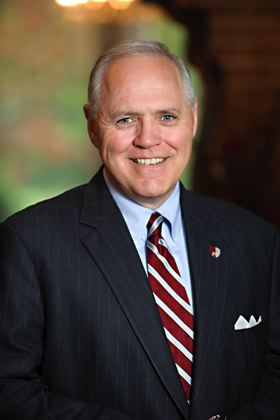
- Church: Presbyterian Church in America
- Other posts: Command Chaplain, United States Military Intelligence Readiness Command, 2015-2018; Provost, Provost Erskine Theological Seminary, 2019–2021; James H. Ragsdale Chair of Missions and Evangelism, Erskine Theological Seminary 2015–;, Chancellor-President, Reformed Theological Seminary, 2007–2014; James Baird Chair of Pastoral Theology, 2007-2013; Senior Minister, First Presbyterian Church of Chattanooga, Tennessee, 2001–2008

Orders
- Ordination: 1993 by Heartland Presbytery, Presbyterian Church in America
- Consecration: Kansas City
- Rank: Ordained Minister, Colonel, U. S. Army retired, Distinguished Professor of Missions and Evangelism

Personal details
- Born: Michael Anthony Milton; 1958 (age 67–68) New Orleans, Louisiana, U.S.
- Denomination: Presbyterian (PCA)
- Residence: North Carolina
- Occupation: Minister, theologian, educator, broadcaster, author, chaplain, musician, composer
- Education: Knox Theological Seminary; Defense Language Institute; Harvard University; MidAmerica Nazarene University; University of Wales, Lampeter; University of North Carolina at Chapel Hill; United States Army Command and General Staff College
- Alma mater: University of North Carolina at Chapel Hill
- Musical career
- Genre: Christian Folk
- Years active: 2005–present
- Label: Bethesda Records
- Website: michaelmilton.org
- Military career
- Allegiance: United States of America
- Branches: United States Navy; United States Navy Reserve; United States Army; Army Reserve
- Service years: 1976–1982; 1991–2018
- Rank: Colonel
- Commands: Command Chaplain, U.S. Military Intelligence Readiness Command
- Awards: Legion of Merit; Meritorious Service Medal

Michael Anthony Milton (born 1958) is an American Presbyterian minister, theologian, educator, pastor, broadcaster, author, musician and retired U.S. Army Chaplain (Colonel). Initially a pastoral intern under D. James Kennedy, Milton became President and Senior Fellow of the D. James Kennedy Institute of Reformed Leadership. Milton succeeded Kennedy as the Teaching Pastor on the nationally televised sermon broadcast Truths That Transform (2013–2015). He has dual credentials in the Presbyterian Church in America and the Associate Reformed Presbyterian Church, and is also credentialed through the Presbyterian and Reformed Commission on Chaplains. Milton was elected to the James Ragsdale Chair of Missions and Evangelism at Erskine Theological Seminary in June 2015. He was named Provost of the Seminary in 2019. In 2022 Milton was named Distinguished Professor of Missions and Evangelism.

Milton has been Senior Minister of the First Presbyterian Church of Chattanooga, Tennessee, President of the Charlotte campus of RTS (2007) and Chancellor and chief executive officer of Reformed Theological Seminary (RTS) (2010). He is the founder and president of Faith For Living, Inc. a North Carolina non-profit organization engaged in Christian discipleship, education, and communication.

== Career ==
=== Christian ministry ===
Michael A. Milton was educated for the ministry under D. James Kennedy, George W. Knight III, R. Laird Harris, and Robert L. Reymond at Knox Theological Seminary. He is a graduate of the Defense Language Institute in Monterey, California; received a B.A. from MidAmerica Nazarene University, and Master of Divinity from Knox Theological Seminary. He earned the Doctor of Philosophy in Theology and Religious studies from the University of Wales, Lampeter. He wrote his dissertation in seventeenth century pastoral theology under William Price and Noel Gibbard, University of Wales, Lampeter. Milton is an alumnus of the University of North Carolina at Chapel Hill in the Master of Public Administration program of the School of Government (2016). Milton studied public administration under William Rivenbark. Milton is, also, a graduate of the United States Army Command and General Staff College in Leavenworth, Kansas. His postgraduate studies include a postdoctoral certification in higher education teaching at Harvard University Derek Bok Center for Teaching and Learning.

Milton was founding pastor of Redeemer Presbyterian Church and of Westminster Academy of Overland Park, Kansas; Interim President, Knox Theological Seminary; founding pastor, Kirk O' the Isles, Savannah, Georgia; Senior Pastor, First Presbyterian Church of Chattanooga, Tennessee; before his appointment as president of RTS-Charlotte.

Milton was elected to become chancellor and chief executive officer of Reformed Theological Seminary on September 2, 2010. Milton succeeded Robert "Ric" Cannada, Jr. The investiture and inauguration service was held on September 14, 2012.

Prior to becoming chancellor, Milton was President of RTS-Charlotte, elected in 2007, interim president of RTS Orlando, and the James M. Baird, Jr. Chair of Pastoral Theology since 2009. He retained the Chair of Pastoral Theology with his election as Chancellor.

On March 13, 2013, it was announced that the Executive Committee of the Seminary granted retirement from the position in order to seek recovery from a chronic illness (Dysautonomia) that had become increasingly debilitating. The move was described as compassionate in order for Milton to fully recover and be able to return to ministry. Milton wrote a theological reflection on the illness called, "Difficult but Necessary: Relinquishing Leadership in Winter to Renew Ministry in a New Season." Milton remained an adjunct member of the faculty.

Milton is a faculty member and speaker with the Intercollegiate Studies Institute, and is a contributor to the Center for Vision and Values, a conservative think tank, at Grove City College. He is a contributing editor to and contributing writer for Preaching.com. He is, also, an adjunct faculty member of Belhaven University, Lancaster Bible College and holds the James Ragsdale Chair of Missions and Evangelism at Erskine Theological Seminary.

In addition to devotional and Biblical themes, Milton writes as a public theologian. He has written numerous commentaries on Christian faith in the public square. The Billy Graham Evangelistic Association invited Milton to write the theological affirmation for the Billy Graham final crusade, "My Hope". Milton was invited by President Ronald Reagan's son, Michael Reagan, to speak at the Reagan Center in Santa Barbara, California. He spoke on September 26, 2013, at the Reagan Center, before the guests of the Young America's Foundation, on the topic of "What the Legacy of Ronald Reagan Can Teach Us Today about Religious Liberty."

Milton has presented and published peer-reviewed academic papers at American Society of Church History (ASCH), the Evangelical Theological Society. Milton's published Curriculum Vitae lists him as a member of the Society of Biblical Literature. John Donne Society, The Royal Society of St George, and the John Milton (American) Society. He was appointed as Senior Editor of the U.S. Army Chaplain Corps Journal. Milton is a contributing writer for Salem Media Group.

Milton teaches or has taught on the mission of the Church in the world, homiletics, church planting, apologetics, world religions, and pastoral theology courses at the masters and doctoral levels at Reformed Theological Seminary, Knox Theological Seminary, Lancaster Bible College, and Erskine Theological Seminary. Milton, also, teaches theological perspectives on economics, public policy, leadership, and public administration at Belhaven University.

Michael A. Milton has advocated a "reorientation" to a "parochial theology" or a "parish ministry" in order to more faithfully fulfill the Biblical vision of the ordained ministry and the ordinary work of discipleship, especially in Reformed churches. He codified a vocational training portion of this vision in his concept of "pastoral residency" following theological seminary training. Milton wrote on accomplishing this arrangement under a proposed fellowship called the D. James Kennedy Institute of Reformed Leadership. The Associate Reformed Presbyterian Church voted in 2017 to partner with Milton to become the host and developer for the D. James Kennedy Institute and the pastoral residency fellowship. In 2021 The D. James Kennedy Institute of Reformed Leadership launched a multi-grant-supported initiative: "Reimagining Pastoral Education and Training," featuring the program's core ministry, the "Pastoral Training Model."

=== Preaching ===
Milton is an evangelistic preacher. He is the Founder and President of Faith for Living, an evangelistic outreach ministry. Milton followed D. James Kennedy as preacher on the broadcast Truth that Transforms.

Milton has been the keynote preacher for the National Preaching Conference on three occasions, and the International Congress on Preaching in Cambridge, England.

In his capacity as an educator, Milton designed a homiletics structural model that uses a scaffolding pedagogy of eight movements. The model was published on the Faith for Living website and remains available as an open-source resource.

=== Military service ===
Milton is a former Navy top-secret linguist who later served as a Chaplain (Colonel) in the United States Army Reserves. He was appointed by the Chief of Chaplains of the United States Army in 2010 to the College of Military Preachers. Michael A. Milton served as a faculty member of the U.S. Army Chaplain Center and School at Fort Jackson, South Carolina. The Combined Arms Research Library lists Milton as Senior Editor of the Chaplain Corps Journal' in issues from 2013 to 2015. In 2015, Milton was selected by the United States Army Reserve Command to the position of Command Chaplain of United States Army Military Intelligence Readiness Command. Milton was awarded the Legion of Merit upon his retirement in February 2018. Governor Roy Cooper of the State of North Carolina conferred the Order of the Long Leaf Pine citing Milton's contributions to public service in North Carolina.

Michael Anthony Milton is a member of the Sons of the Revolution, General Davidson North Carolina chapter, and the American Legion.

=== Music ===
Milton is a singer-songwriter, performer, and recording artist who has released five Christian music albums: He Shall Restore (2005), Follow Your Call (2009), Through the open door (2011), Wind and Waves: A Collection (2015).

A Christmas album, (2012) was released on October 23, 2012.

Milton, under Bethesda Records, released a single entitled, "A Promise is Stronger than Blood". A press release from McCain & Associates announced that the single was released to support sanctity of life adoption ministries. In 2019, Bethesda Records released "God is Calling Faithful Men" (with Michael Card) as a single.

== Books ==
Milton is the author of or contributor to the following books:

- From Flanders Field to the Moviegoer: Philosophical Foundations for a Transcendent Ethical Framework. Eugene, OR: Wipf and Stock Publishers. 2019. ISBN 9781725251496
- Foundations of a Moral Government: Lex, Rex - A New Annotated Version in Contemporary English. Dallas: Tanglewood Publishing. 2019. ISBN 978-0997249088.
- Milton, Michael (2018). Called? Pastoral Guidance for the Divine Call to Gospel Ministry. Ross-Shire, Scotland: Christian Focus Publications. ISBN 9781527101128.
- Vocation and Reform in Public Administration (Master of Public Administracion thesis, University of North Carolina at Chapel Hill). GRIN Verlag Academic Publishing. 2018. ISBN 9783668625730.
- "So, What are You Doing Here?" The Role of the Minister of the Gospel in Hospital Visitation or a Theological Cure for the Crisis in Evangelical Pastoral Care. GRIN Verlag Academic Publishing. 2018. ISBN 9783668622081.
- "Millenarianism" in The Jonathan Edwards Encyclopedia. Eerdmans Publishing Company. 2017. ISBN 9780802869524.
- Lord, I Want to Follow Your Call: A Pastoral Guide to the Ordained Ministry. Bethesda Publishing Group. 2016. ISBN 978-0692793732.
- Vocation and Reform. Civitas: Faith for Living, Inc. 2016. ISBN 978-1535315302.
- The Secret Life of a Pastor (and other intimate letters on ministry. Christian Focus. 2015. ISBN 978-1781915967.
- Journey of a Lifetime. Fortress Book Service. 2014. ISBN 978-0985289744.
- Sounding the Depths: When the Savour Prays for His People. EP Books. 2013. ISBN 978-0852349717.
- Silent No More: A Biblical Call for the Church to Speak to State and Culture. Fortress Book Service, EP Books in the U.K. 2013. ISBN 978-0985289713.
- Finding a Vision for Your Church: Assembly Required. P&R Publishing. 2012. ISBN 978-1596384385.
- What God Starts, God Completes: Help and Hope for Hurting People, Third Edition with updates and a new Introduction. Christian Focus Publications. 2012. ISBN 978-1845508234.
- What is the Doctrine of Adoption?. P&R Publishing. 2012. ISBN 978-1-59638-391-3.
- Hit by Friendly Fire: uWhat to Do When Fellow Believers Hurt You. EP Books. 2011. ISBN 978-0-85234-776-8.
- Songs in the Night: How God Transforms our Pain into Praise. P&R Publishing. 2011. ISBN 978-1-59638-221-3.
- Small Things, Big Things: Inspiring Stories of God's Everyday Grace. P&R Publishing. 2009. ISBN 978-1-59638-145-2.
- Milton, Michael (2009). What is the Doctrine of the Perseverance of the Saints?. Phillipsburg: NJ: P&R Publishing. ISBN 978-1-59638-094-3.
- Hit by Friendly Fire: What to do when you are hurt by other believers. Wipf and Stock Publishers. 2008. ISBN 978-1-55635-928-6.
- What God Starts, God Completes: Help and Hope for Hurting People. Christian Focus Publications. 2007. ISBN 978-1-84550-276-8.
- Cooperation without Compromise: Faithful Gospel Witness in a Pluralistic Setting. Wipf and Stock Publishers. 2007. ISBN 978-1-55635-390-1.
- Oh the Deep, Deep Love of Jesus: Expository Messages from John 17. Wipf and Stock Publishers. 2007. ISBN 978-1-59752-218-2.
- Following Ben: Expository Preaching for Frail Followers of Pulpit Giants. Wipf and Stock Publishers. 2006. ISBN 1-59752-958-3.
- Giving as an Act of Worship. Wipf and Stock Publishers. 2006. ISBN 1-59752-712-2.
- Leaving a Career to Follow a Call: A Vocational Guide to the Ordained Ministry. Wipf and Stock Publishers. 1999. ISBN 1-57910-347-2.
- Authentic Christianity and the Life of Freedom. Wipf and Stock Publishers. 2005. ISBN 1-59752-212-0.
- The Demands of Discipleship: Expository Messages from Daniel. Wipf and Stock Publishers. 2005. ISBN 1-59752-217-1.
