= First Presbyterian Church (Hattiesburg, Mississippi) =

- The First Presbyterian Church of Hattiesburg
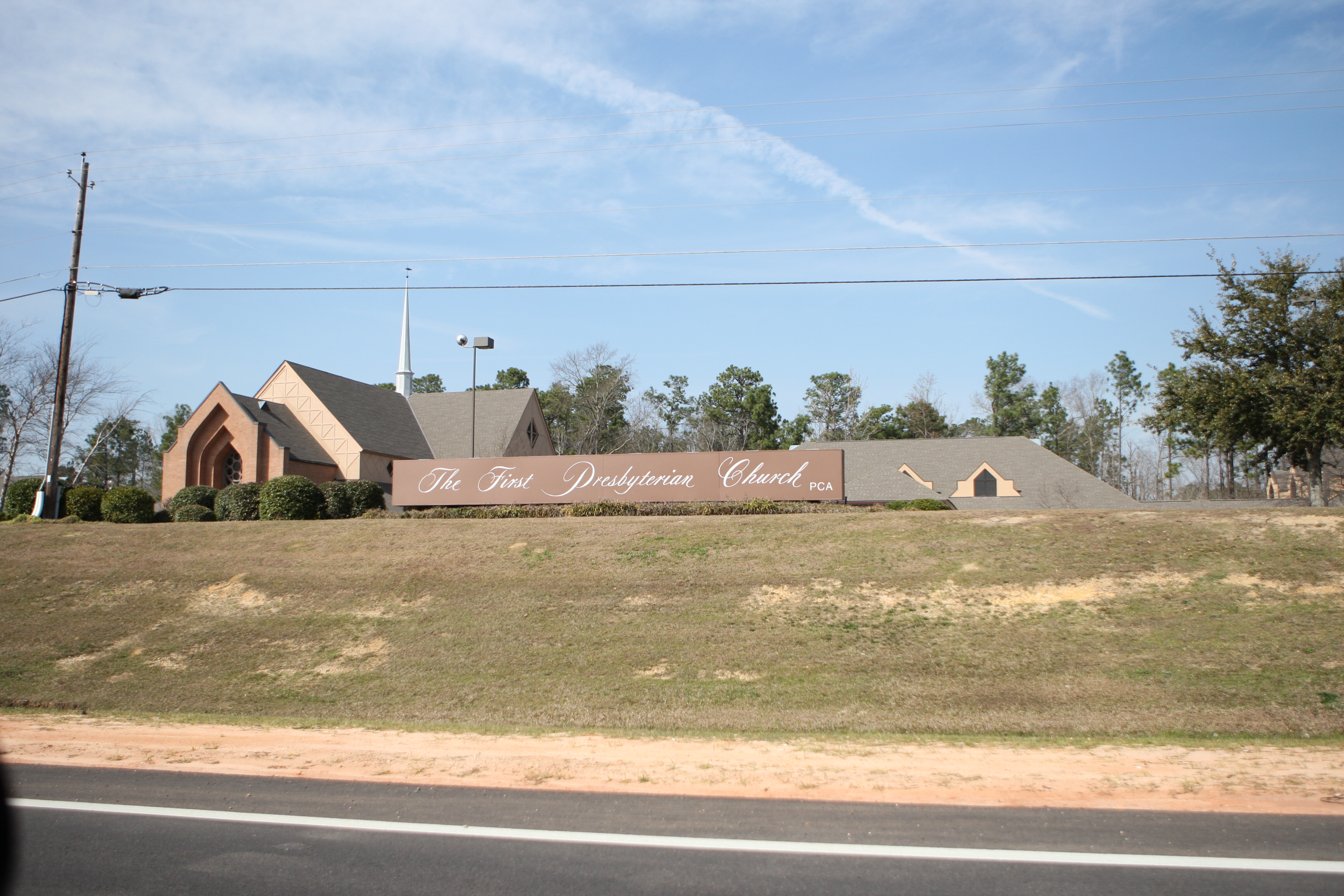

- Location within Mississippi
- 31°19′28.7″N 89°21′42.7″W
- Location: 4901 Hardy Street, Hattiesburg, Mississippi
- Country: United States
- Denomination: Presbyterian Church in America
- Previous denomination: Presbyterian Church in the United States
- Churchmanship: Evangelical, Reformed
- Website: fpcpca.net

History
- Former name: Bouie Presbyterian Church
- Founded: 5 March 1882

Architecture
- Completed: 1990
- Construction cost: $5 million

First Presbyterian Church is a historic Presbyterian congregation in Hattiesburg, Mississippi, founded in 1882 by Rev. A. B. Coit. It was the first church in the town and predated Hattiesburg's own incorporation by two years. In 1973 it left the Presbyterian Church in the United States to become a charter member of the more theologically conservative Presbyterian Church in America.

== History ==
=== Founding ===
The church was first located at McDonald's Mill, a sawmill seven miles northeast of downtown, but moved to the center of Hattiesburg in 1883. The first supply pastor, Rev. H. C. Smith, also served small congregations in Jones and Perry counties. The young congregation first met in space shared with the local school; while their first building was built, they shared space with the local Methodist church and adopted the name Bouie Presbyterian. In 1886, the church called the Rev. J. M. Smith as pastor, who spent seven years ministering in Hattiesburg and other small congregations in the area. Smith had been born in Mt. Olive, Mississippi and studied at Union Presbyterian Seminary.

=== Currie and McIntosh Pastorates ===
In 1893, Dr. E. J. Currie was called as pastor, and his tenure saw the congregation move into its second building, white clapboard with twin spires, at 723 Main Street. Dr. Currie also served as the superintendent of schools in Perry County and eventually the first superintendent of Hattiesburg Public Schools. In 1918, he would become president of Chickasaw Female College. The church planted two still extant daughter congregations in this period, Petal Presbyterian in 1902 and Bay Street Presbyterian in 1906. When planting Bay Street, which was also in Hattiesburg, the congregation changed its name to First Presbyterian.

The church's longest serving minister was Dr. W. H. McIntosh, who served from 1919 until 1954. Dr. McIntosh oversaw the 1929 move to a new building a few blocks north on Main Street, which now houses the True Light Missionary Baptist Church. He also served as moderator of the Synod of Mississippi of the Presbyterian Church in the United States, and on the board of trustees of Southwestern University and Columbia Theological Seminary.

=== Civil Rights Era ===
Near the end of Dr. McIntosh's ministry, the Rev. William J. Stanway was called as an assistant pastor, succeeding as senior pastor on the unexpected death of McIntosh in 1954. Stanway had been educated at Bob Jones University and Westminster Theological Seminary. Under his leadership two more churches were planted, Westminster Presbyterian and Pineview Presbyterian. Stanway also played a role in founding Reformed Theological Seminary in Jackson, Mississippi in 1966. During the Civil Rights Movement he followed the path of other Hattiesburg clergy in remaining silent on the great upheavals of the time. Robert Patrick Rayner writes:

Reverend W. J. Stanway never mentioned the northern ministers or civil rights protests from his pulpit. Even Newton Cox [of Westminster Presbyterian Church], considered the most liberal of the three [Presbyterian] ministers, refused to recognize on Sunday morning any social unrest in his community for fear of upsetting the peace and unity of the church.

In 1964, a delegation of three pastors and two elders from Hattiesburg's Presbyterian churches traveled to First Presbyterian Church in Charleston, Illinois to protest the participation of pastors from that area in the civil rights protests in Hattiesburg.

=== The Presbyterian Church in America ===
In 1970, the Rev. Ed Johnson, formerly an assistant pastor at Coral Ridge Presbyterian Church, was called to First Presbyterian Hattiesburg. He brought with him from his time at Coral Ridge under the tutelage of D. James Kennedy the Evangelism Explosion program. Johnson's pastorate also saw the planting of Woodland Presbyterian Church and the departure of the congregation, and many of its plants, to the new Presbyterian Church in America in response to the increasing theological liberalism of the Presbyterian Church in the United States. The PCA committed itself to be, "faithful to the Scriptures, true to the Reformed faith, and obedient to the Great Commission."

Dr. L. Roy Taylor, a professor from Reformed Theological Seminary, was called as senior pastor of the church. Growth under his leadership led to the decision to build a new church in 1990 to the west of town near I-59. At the time, the area was undeveloped but the church leadership saw the steady development of the town to the west and sought to position the congregation for future growth. The church, which cost $5 million to build and stands on 16 acres (6.5 ha) of land.

The church has provided a leadership role in the broader PCA, with Dr. Taylor serving as the Stated Clerk in 1994, and a ruling elder, Samuel J. Duncan, serving as moderator of the General Assembly in 1998. Dr. H. Andrew Silman served as pastor from 1994 until 2006, and was succeeded in 2009, after a lengthy interim period, by Dr. Sean Michael Lucas, previously a professor of Covenant Theological Seminary (This is no longer current information. Dr. Lucas is now the senior pastor of Independent Presbyterian Church in Memphis, Tennessee. He has been succeeded by Rev. Jim McCarthy.) Recent years have seen significant expansion of the physical plant with the construction of Currie and McIntosh Halls.

== Services ==
First Presbyterian has worship services on Sunday at 10:45 am and 6:00 pm. The morning worship services are designed to draw on the great traditions of the church's worship music. The evening service is intended to be more acoustic and informal, drawing both from traditional hymns as well as music developed by Reformed University Fellowship, the college ministry of the PCA. The centerpiece of each service is the Expository preaching from the Bible.
