= Jason Zachary =

American politician (born 1977)

Deputy Speaker of the Tennessee House of Representatives

Member of the Tennessee House of Representatives from the 14th district
- Incumbent
- Assumed office August 24, 2015
- Preceded by: Ryan A. Haynes

Personal details
- Born: June 29, 1977 (age 49)
- Party: Republican
- Spouse: Holly Zachary
- Children: Tyson
- Education: Pellissippi State Community College; A.S.

Jason K. Zachary (born June 29, 1977) is an American politician. A Republican, he represents the 14th district, encompassing parts of Knox County, in the Tennessee State House of Representatives.

== Background ==
Jason Zachary was born on June 29, 1977, to his mother Pamela D. Zachary and father Richard K. Zachary and moved with his parents to Knoxville, Tennessee, at age 15 during 1992. Richard Zachary is the CEO of Americomm, Inc. and founded this business during 1994. Americomm, Inc. was first registered with the Tennessee Secretary of State as a For-profit Corporation - Domestic on April 1, 2014.

Zachary graduated from Farragut High School and later completed an associate degree in Marketing during 1996 from Pellissippi State Community College at Hardin Valley, Tennessee, located in the northwest section of Knox County, Tennessee. Zachary briefly attended the University of Tennessee sports management program but did not complete the requirements for a degree.

Zachary married to wife Holly during 2000 and acquired an ownership interest in his father's Americomm, Inc. business during that same year.

Zachary has been the Vice President of Agent Sales at Americomm since 1999, and was also on the board of directors for the 501(c)(3) non-profit International Sports Consulting, Inc. of Knoxville, Tennessee

Zachary and his wife have one son, Tyson.

Zachary is a Southern Baptist and a member at First Baptist Church Concord megachurch in Knoxville where he reportedly serves as a deacon and steward on the finance committee overseeing a $9 million budget. Zachary also serves on the board of the Western Heights Baptist Center.

== Political career ==
Zachary was first elected to the Tennessee State House of Representatives on August 12, 2015. He was sworn in on August 24. He is a House member of the 109th through 111th General Assemblies.

=== 2013 and 2014 (federal candidate) ===
Zachary files Form 2 Statement of candidacy as a federal primary candidate in the 2014 Tennessee Republican Primary with the Federal Election Commission (March 11, 2013).

Zachary reportedly became a partner of the D. James Kennedy Center for Christian Statesmanship in 2014.

Zachary launches his campaign web site announcing his candidacy within the 2014 Tennessee Republican Primary, challenging long-serving incumbent John J. "Jimmy" Duncan, Jr. for election to the represent the Tennessee 2nd House District office within the U.S. House of Representatives.

On his 2013-2014 Jason Zachary for Congress campaign web site, Zachary claimed that God had communicated to him, stating that he began to "feel the Lord calling him to serve his country in 2011" with his brand of "Christ inspired leadership". Zachary lost the 2014 federal primary election as a federal candidate to incumbent U.S. Representative Jimmy Duncan.

=== 2015 (state candidate) ===
After former TNGA Representative Ryan A. Haynes resigned May 27, 2015, to serve as the Chairman of the Tennessee Republican Party, Zachary and Knox County school board member Karen Carson sought to fill the remaining one year left in the vacated term of Rep. Ryan A. Haynes in a special election that officials estimated cost Knox County taxpayers over $100,000. Only slightly more than 10 per cent of the registered voters in the west Knox County 14th Tennessee House District turned out to vote, with Zachary netting 2,397 of the ballots cast while Carson took 1,742 votes in the unofficial returns.

The Associated Press news reports referred to Zachary as "outspoken opponent" of Tennessee Governor and Knoxville resident Bill Haslam’s own proposal for the State of Tennessee to extend health coverage to 280,000 low-income Tennesseans.

Immediately after the 2015 state election results were posted, Zachary also reportedly moved the goalposts of an earlier claim that he "began to feel the Lord [Jesus] calling him to serve his country in 2011" that Zachary made during his failed 2013-2014 election campaign efforts to defeat an incumbent congressman during the Republican Primary in Knox County and be elected to the U.S. House of Representatives by stating, "“People would say, ‘Did God really call you to run for Congress?’ And I can say tonight, yes, tonight validates, because if I had not done that, I would not be sitting here, the Republican nominee to be the state representative for this area.”

Lacking any Democratic Party opponent during the 2015 general election, Jason Zachary was appointed as Representative by the Knox County Commission on August 24, 2015 to fill the District 14 House seat formerly held by Haynes. Zachary reportedly had his first oath of office staged inside his First Baptist Concord megachurch in Knoxville with then Tennessee House of Representatives Speaker Beth Harwell administering his oath of office.

In 2023, Zachary supported a resolution to expel Democratic lawmakers from the legislature for violating decorum rules. The expulsion was widely characterized as unprecedented.

=== Tenure ===
Zachary sponsored HB 563 which would protect businesses that refuse service to LGBTQ people.

Zachary has supported defunding public education in favor of private schools. Zachary's wife Holly is employed by the Concord Christian School in Knoxville.

In September 2020, Zachary and Knox County Mayor Glenn Jacobs and 'The Bed Store' owner Roger Cunningham created a video for the group Freedom Forward TN describing the Knoxville Board of Health - its membership made up of mostly public health and medical professionals - as part of the "sinister forces within" the United States attacking America. The Freedom Forward TN video was posted online with photo images of the members of the Knoxville Board of Health who later reportedly stated that they felt threatened by the content of the video.
