= Tennessee House of Representatives 14th district =

State legislative district in Tennessee

Tennessee's 14th State House of Representatives district
- Map of Tennessee House districts with the 14th District shaded in red
Representative
Jason Zachary; R–Knoxville
since 2015
- Demographics: 85.6% White; 2.5% Black; 3.5% Hispanic; 4.5% Asian; 3.3% Multiracial
- Population (2024): 75,781

The Tennessee House of Representatives 14th district is one of the 99 legislative districts in the lower house of the Tennessee General Assembly. The district is located in East Tennessee and covers southwest Knox County. It includes outlying suburbs of Knoxville and the town of Farragut. It also includes the unincorporated communities of Bluegrass, Concord, Keller Bend, and Tooles Bend, Tennessee. The Tennessee River and Fort Loudoun Lake form the southern border. Jason Zachary has represented the district since 2015.

== Demographics ==
The Tennessee Comptroller estimates the population as of 2024 at 75,781. Median incomes nearly double the Tennessee median of $69,525, at $129,685.

- 87.6% of the district is White
- 4.5% of the district is Asian
- 2.5% of the district is Black
- 3.5% of the district is Hispanic
- 3.3% of the district is Two or more races

Detailed demographic information is also available through Census Reporter.

== History ==
The 88th Tennessee General Assembly was the first in which all districts were numbered. The 14th district has been in Knox County since its creation.

== List of Representatives ==
Representative	Party	Years of Service	General Assembly	Hometown
Jason Zachary	Republican	2015 - present	109th-114th	Knoxville
Ryan A. Haynes	Republican	2009-2014	106th-108th	Knoxville
Parkey Strader	Republican	2005-2008	104th-105th	Knoxville
H. E. Bittle	Republican	1989-2004	96th-103rd	Knoxville
Joseph R. May	Republican	1985-1988	94th-95th	Knoxville
James C. Hudson III	Republican	1981-1984	92nd-93rd	Knoxville
William B. Nolan	Democratic	1977-1980	90th-91st	Knoxville
Ben Atchley	Republican	1973-1976	88th-89th	Knoxville
