= Morton H. Smith =

American Presbyterian minister

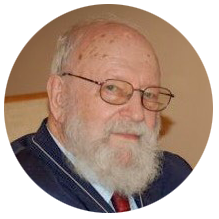
Morton Howison Smith

Morton Howison Smith (December 11, 1923 – November 12, 2017) was an American Presbyterian minister. He was the first Stated Clerk of the Presbyterian Church in America, serving from 1973 to 1988, and also served as its Moderator in 2000.

Smith had degrees from the University of Michigan, Columbia Theological Seminary and the Free University of Amsterdam.

He was a founder of both Reformed Theological Seminary and Greenville Presbyterian Theological Seminary. He taught at Belhaven College and Reformed Theological Seminary before becoming Stated Clerk of the General Assembly of the Presbyterian Church in America. Smith continued to serve as Professor of Systematic and Biblical Theology at Greenville Presbyterian Theological Seminary in his retirement.

In 2004, a Festschrift was published in his honor. Confessing our Hope: Essays Celebrating the Life and Ministry of Morton H. Smith included contributions from J. Ligon Duncan III and George W. Knight III.

== Racial views ==
Smith wrote in favor of the equal treatment of all races, and was neutral on the matter of racial integration or segregation, while he opposed large-scale interracial marriage:

[T]he present writer ... is not able to find any clear teaching of the Scripture that would condemn individual intermarriage as such, except between the Christian and the nonChristian. ... God has established and thus revealed his will for the human race now to be that of ethnic pluriformity, and thus any scheme of mass integration leading to mass mixing of the races is decidedly unscriptural. On the other hand, integration of the races that does not necessarily lead to mass intermarriage is not necessarily unscriptural. ... [T]he real task of the Christian in the South is to strive for just and equal treatment of all. ... [T]he matter of a segregated or integrated culture is a matter of the liberty of the people of any particular area.
