= D. James Kennedy Center for Christian Statesmanship =

The D. James Kennedy Center for Christian Statesmanship (CCS) is a Washington, DC–based discipleship and evangelism outreach to train and equip members of Congress, staffers and interns to be "Christian statesmen." Founded by author, pastor and television evangelist D. James Kennedy in 1995, the Center offers Bible studies, luncheons, lecture series, as well as evangelism and leadership training on Capitol Hill.

The Center gives its "Distinguished Christian Statesman Award" annually to high-profile Christian political leaders. Past honorees include Mike Pence, Tom DeLay, Sam Brownback, John Ashcroft, and Mike Huckabee.

== History ==
D. James Kennedy (1930–2007) founded CCS in 1995 as an outreach of his television and radio outreach, Coral Ridge Ministries—now D. James Kennedy Ministries (DJKM). For Kennedy, the new Washington, DC–based branch of his media ministry was a strategic foray into a key mission field. "Never before have we had the opportunity to be right in the midst of our nation's capital, to be a voice for Christ where it is needed so very much," Kennedy told viewers in 1995. "We are in the midst of a war, a war of values, a war against God and his truth. And it's why we're now in Washington, DC, striving to spread the gospel and minister to those Christians who are trying to make a difference."

By 1999, then-CCS director Frank Wright claimed 50 members of Congress were participating in a weekly Bible study.

Beginning in late 2007, the Center operated under the auspices of Evangelism Explosion, another ministry founded by Kennedy. DJKM resumed its operational control of CCS in 2017.

Initially housed in offices in the Heritage Foundation building on Capitol Hill, CCS moved into its own facility, a three-story row house two blocks from the U.S. Capitol, in 2013.

In 2018, DJKM launched the D. James Kennedy Center for Christian Leadership, as an initiative of its Center for Christian Statesmanship in Washington, D.C. The Center for Christian Leadership provides comprehensive leadership training to those preparing to seek elected office and to those seeking other areas of service in the public policy arena.
