= Strader =

Strader is a surname. Notable people with the surname include:

- Dave Strader (1955–2017), American sports announcer
- Park M. Strader (1945–2009), American politician
- Peter W. Strader (1818–1881), American politician
- Raion Strader (born 2004), American football player
- Red Strader (1902–1956), American football player and coach

== See also ==
- Strader, California, in Kern County
- Strader v. Graham, United States Supreme Court case
