= Westminster Seminary =

Westminster Seminary may refer to:

- Westminster Theological Seminary, in Philadelphia, Pennsylvania
- Westminster Seminary California, in Escondido, California
- Westminster Seminary UK, in Newcastle upon Tyne, England
