= Ryan Haynes =

Ryan Haynes may refer to:

- Ryan A. Haynes (born 1985), member of the Tennessee House of Representatives
- Ryan Haynes (footballer) (born 1995), English footballer
