= Chicago Graduate School of Theology =

The Chicago Graduate School of Theology is an American school of theology. It was founded in 1920 as the Winona Lake School of Theology, and was located in Winona Lake, Indiana, until 1970 when it was moved to the Chicago area and changed its name.

The school was founded in 1920 by G. Campbell Morgan, a well-known pastor of his day who had recently left Westminster Chapel in London, England, to spend time in the United States. Jasper Abraham Huffman served as president of the school beginning in 1928, and his son John Abram Huffman later served as president from 1953 to 1970.

Notable alumni include James Strauss, D. James Kennedy, and Dwight Zeller.
