= Kingsport Times-News =

Daily newspaper in Kingsport, Tennessee

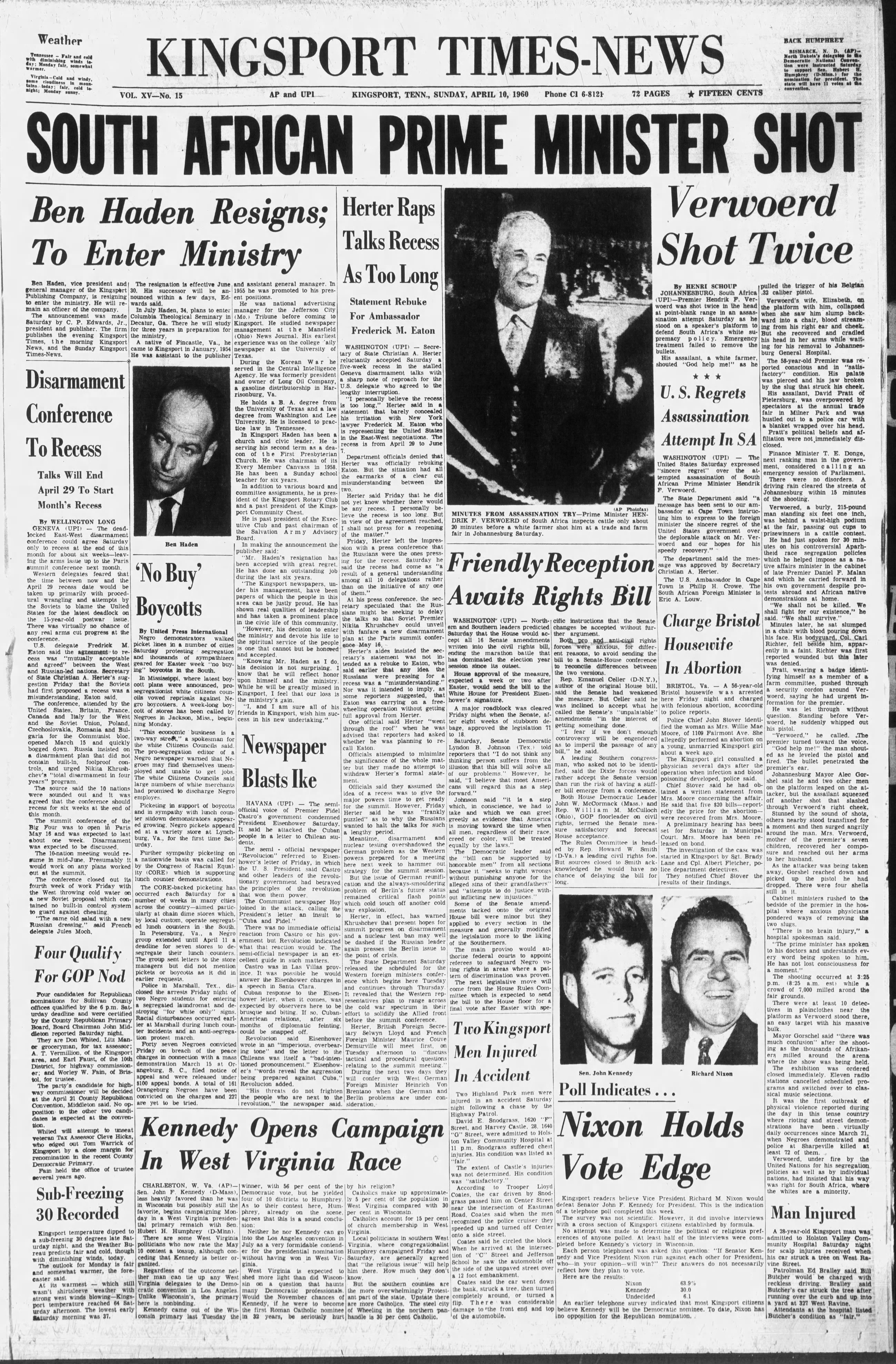
- Representative front page of the Times-News in April 1960
- Type: Daily newspaper
- Format: Broadsheet
- Owner(s): Six Rivers Media, LLC.
- Founded: Times: 1916; Times News: 1943
- Language: English
- Headquarters: 701 Lynn Garden Drive; Kingsport, Tennessee 37660
- OCLC number: 32068716
- Website: timesnews.net

The Kingsport Times-News is a daily broadsheet newspaper published in Kingsport, Tennessee, and distributed in six counties in Northeast Tennessee and Southwest Virginia. It is owned by Six Rivers Media, LLC.

== History ==
The first edition of the Kingsport Times was first published on April 27, 1916. The newspaper became the Kingsport Times-News in 1944.

On April 19, 2023, the paper announced it would reduce its publishing cycle from seven days to six days a week. Starting in May, the Saturday and Sunday edition were combined.

== See also ==
- List of newspapers in Tennessee
- Ben Haden
