= Erskine Theological Seminary =

- Motto: For Christ and His Church.
- Type: Theological Seminary
- Established: 1837; 189 years ago
- Affiliations: Associate Reformed Presbyterian Church, Association of Theological Schools in the United States and Canada, SACS
- Dean: Seth J. Nelson
- Faculty: 29
- Students: 139 (fall 2022)
- Location: Due West, Columbia, South Carolina, and Greenville, South Carolina, SC, USA; 34°19′53″N 82°23′25″W
- Campus: Rural
- Colors: Garnet, Gold
- Website: seminary.erskine.edu

Erskine Theological Seminary, a division of Erskine College, is an institution of graduate theological and pastoral education. The seminary is based in Due West, South Carolina. It also offers classes in Columbia, South Carolina and Greenville, South Carolina. Erskine Seminary is in the conservative Presbyterian tradition, and primarily prepares candidates for ordained Christian ministry. The Seminary, founded in 1837, is a part of Erskine College, a liberal arts college established in 1839 and affiliated with the Associate Reformed Presbyterian Church. The mission of Erskine Theological Seminary is to prepare "men and women to fulfill the Great Commission of Jesus Christ through theological higher education that is ecclesial, missional, and confessional."

== History ==
On April 22, 2011, five members of the Erskine College and Seminary faculties issued a Good Friday Statement addressing toleration of neo-orthodoxy among the Seminary faculty and supporting their understanding of the Bible as "inerrant in the original autographs" as the official position of the Associate Reformed Presbyterian Church. The Seminary began strengthening conservative and evangelical positions and alliances. Michael A. Milton, the former chancellor of Reformed Seminary, president of Knox Theological Seminary, Chaplain (Colonel) USA Ret., and a longtime pastor in the Presbyterian Church in America, became Provost in December 2019.

== Degree programs ==
Erskine Theological Seminary offers residential study at its campuses in Due West, Columbia, and Greenville, South Carolina. The Seminary provides study opportunities through residential, blended online and online modes.

Students may create concentrations in Chaplain Ministries, Pastoral Counseling, and Sports Ministry. Programs include:

- Master of Divinity (M.Div.)
- Master of Arts in Practical Ministry (M.A.P.M)
- Master of Arts in Theological Studies (M.A.T.S)
- Master of Theology (Th.M.)
- Doctor of Ministry (D.Min.)
