= Alex Constanza =

American basketball player (born 2006)

No. 23 – Pepperdine Waves
- Position: Small forward
- League: West Coast Conference

Personal information
- Born: October 26, 2006 (age 20) Fort Lauderdale, Florida, U.S.
- Listed height: 6 ft 8 in (2.03 m)
- Listed weight: 205 lb (93 kg)

Career information
- High school: Westminster Academy (Fort Lauderdale, Florida); SPIRE Academy (Geneva, Ohio)
- College: Pepperdine (2026–present)

Alexander Jaden Constanza (born October 26, 2006) is a Dominican-American college basketball player for the Pepperdine Waves of the West Coast Conference.

== Early life and high school ==
Constanza was born and raised in South Florida. He began his high school career at Westminster Academy in Fort Lauderdale, Florida before transferring to SPIRE Academy in Geneva, Ohio prior to his senior year. On November 13, 2025, Constanza was named to the pre-season watch list for the Naismith Prep Player of the Year Award, which honors the top high school basketball player in the country.

=== Recruiting ===
Constanza was widely considered to be one of the highest-rated recruits in the class of 2026, and was projected by several analysts as a future NBA player.

He initially committed to play college basketball for the Georgetown Hoyas over offers from Kansas and NC State, among several other schools. At the time of his commitment, Constanza was the Hoyas' second-highest rated recruit in the modern era, and the highest overall since Greg Monroe joined the program in 2008.

Constanza later reopened his recruitment on April 15, 2026. On June 9, 2026, he announced his commitment to Pepperdine University, becoming the highest-rated recruit in the history of that program.

College recruiting
Name	Hometown	School	Height	Weight	Commit date
Alex Constanza; SF	Fort Lauderdale, FL	SPIRE Academy (OH)	6 ft 8 in (2.03 m)	205 lb (93 kg)	Jun 9, 2026
Alex Constanza; SF	Recruit ratings: Rivals: 247Sports: ESPN: (87)				
Overall recruit ranking: Rivals: 58 247Sports: 77 ESPN: 46
Note: In many cases, Scout, Rivals, 247Sports, On3, and ESPN may conflict in their listings of height and weight.; In these cases, the average was taken. ESPN grades are on a 100-point scale.; Sources: "Pepperdine 2026 Basketball Commitments". Rivals.; "2026 Pepperdine Waves Recruiting Class". ESPN.; "2026 Team Ranking". Rivals.

== Personal life ==
Constanza is Dominican-American through both of his parents.
