= Ben Haden =

American television evangelist (1925–2013)

Ben Haden (October 18, 1925 - October 24, 2013) was an ordained minister in the Presbyterian Church in America. He became internationally known through the religious broadcast, Changed Lives.

== Early life ==
Haden was born in Fincastle, Virginia, in 1925. to Judge Benjamin Haden and Anne Spiller Hadden. He had one sister, Lynn. The family later moved to Houston, Texas.

He received his law degree from Washington and Lee College in 1949 and became a member of the Virginia bar. He also studied at the University of Texas at Austin and Columbia Theological Seminary in Decatur, Georgia.

== Early career ==
Before becoming a preacher, he was the owner and president of the Long Oil Company, he worked for the CIA during the Korean War and was also CEO of Kingsport Times-News,

He was an atheist in his youth. He became a Christian in 1954.

== Preaching career ==
Haden joined Columbia Theological Seminary in 1960. In 1963, he published a non-fiction account of the people he met during his travels as a newspaperman in the Soviet Union, I See Their Faces.

He pastored Key Biscayne Presbyterian Church in Miami, Florida from 1963 to 1967. He then became the 11th pastor of the First Presbyterian Church in Chattanooga, Tennessee in 1968, taking over from James L. Fowle. Haden's preaching style was described as arguing a case before a jury.

He also spoke on the Radio Bible Study Hour, succeeding Donald Grey Barnhouse of Tenth Presbyterian Church in Philadelphia.

Haden handled the news media for several of Billy Graham’s evangelism crusades. When Graham’s mother was honored at the White House by President Nixon in 1971, she asked that Haden preach there and this was permitted.

Haden served the church in Chattanooga for 31 years before resigning in 1998 to pursue Changed Lives.org, an internet streaming video and audio on-demand ministry. The ministry produces "conversations", that last from 5–15 minutes He emphasized that these were not sermons, but simple conversations. This supported one of the aims of Changed Lives, which is to reach the many Americans who claim to be Christians, but do not belong to a physical church.

Haden died in Chattanooga on October 24, 2013. His daughter Dallas took over Changed Lives to continue his work.

== Honors ==
Haden received an honorary doctorate from King College in Bristol, Tennessee.

Haden received the Love of Chattanooga Award and the Sertoman’s National Heritage Award.

His 1970 sermon, ‘’Biopsy or Autopsy’’ (dealing with a Christian's duty to the government) won a Freedoms Foundation Award.

== Personal life ==
Haden married Charlyne Edwards on July 22, 1950. They had one daughter, Dallas.

== Books by Haden ==
- I See Their Faces (1963). Royal Publishers: Johnson City, Tennessee. LCCN: 63025534
- Rebel to Rebel (1971). LOGOI: Miami.
- Pray! Don't Settle for a Two-bit Prayer Life (1974). T. Nelson: Nashville. LCCN: 74005056
