= Westminster Academy (Florida) =

Location
- Fort Lauderdale, Florida; United States; 26.1973056°N 80.112822°W

Information
- Type: Private
- Motto: Latin: Soli Deo Gloria (Glory to God alone)
- Religious affiliation: Presbyterian Church in America
- Established: 1971
- Founder: D. James Kennedy
- Principal: Dr. Ron Farrar (Upper School); Mrs. Tracey Wood (Lower School)
- Headmaster: Dr. Joel Satterly
- Faculty: 95
- Grades: PK2–12
- Enrollment: 1048
- Colors: Navy, white, and red
- Nickname: Lions
- Accreditation: Middle States Association of Colleges and Schools; Christian Schools of Florida, National Council for Private School Accreditation; Council on Educational Standards & Accountability
- Yearbook: Optimé
- Affiliation: Coral Ridge Presbyterian Church
- Website: www.wa.edu

Westminster Academy is a private Christian school in Fort Lauderdale, Florida, serving students in grades PK2 through 12. It is an educational ministry of the Coral Ridge Presbyterian Church and is related denominationally to the Presbyterian Church in America. The main campus is located at 5601 North Federal Highway in Fort Lauderdale, with a "west campus" Athletic Complex located at 3701 NW 44th Street in Lauderdale Lakes.

During the 2026–27 academic year, the school has a total enrollment of 1048 students: 466 in lower school (preprimary–5th grade) and 582 in Upper School (grades 6–12). The current headmaster is Dr. Joel Satterly.

== Athletics ==
Westminster Academy has won many state championships in various sports. Selected highlights include:

- State championship in football in 1990
- Boys' state basketball championship in 2002
- Boys' state basketball championship in 2017, 2018, and 2019.
- Boys' state track championship in 2008, 2014, 2015, and 2017
- Boys' state track championship in 1979 (the school's first boys state championship team)
- Boys' state baseball in 1999 and 2000
- Boys' Cross Country state championships: 1983, 1984, 1985, 1987, 1988, and 2016. Head Coach Ken Key was coach for the 1983 and 2016 state titles.
- Boys' basketball has received national recognition including a top 25 national ranking by maxpreps in the 2016–17 season.

== Awards and recognition ==
On Tuesday, September 30, 2014, the U.S. Secretary of Education, Arne Duncan, recognized the Westminster Academy Lower School as a 2014 National Blue Ribbon School in the category of Exemplary High Performing Schools. The Westminster Academy Lower School will be honored alongside 287 public and 50 private schools across the nation at a recognition ceremony held November 10–11, 2014, in Washington, D.C. In its 32-year history, the National Blue Ribbon Schools Program has bestowed this award on just under 7,900 of America's schools.

== History ==
The school was founded in 1971 by the late Dr. D. James Kennedy, the founding pastor of the Coral Ridge Presbyterian Church.

In October 2000, Westminster Academy announced that it received an $8.35 million donation from 1978 graduate Jean Case and her husband Steve Case, the former chairman of America Online.

== Demographics ==
In 2022, ProPublica reported the student body was 81.6% White and 8.7% Black, while the local school district was 17.8% White and 38.6% Black.

== Notable alumni ==
- Guma Aguiar, Class of 1995, Brazilian-American businessman and philanthropist
- Kevin Chapman, Class of 2006, former professional baseball player
- Alex Constanza, basketball player
- Matt den Dekker, Class of 2006, coach in the New York Mets organization, former professional baseball player
- Rob Hoskins, Class of 1983, president of OneHope, an international Christian ministry
- Danny Kanell, Class of 1992, NFL Quarterback
- Jason Kennedy, Class of 2000, TV personality
- Michael Taylor, Class of 2009, Kansas City Royals baseball outfielder
- Elih Villanueva, Class of 2004, professional baseball pitcher for the West Virginia Power of the Atlantic League of Professional Baseball
