= James D. Strauss =

American theologian

James Dean Strauss (July 3, 1929 – March 19, 2014) was an American theologian who was professor of theology and philosophy at Lincoln Christian Seminary from 1967 to 1994. He has been described by many as the Albert Einstein of the Restoration Movement.

== Life ==
He was born on July 3, 1929, to Earnest and Cleo Strauss in the small town of Herrin, Illinois. His father was a World War I veteran who worked as a coal miner and bookkeeper for Peabody Coal Company. His mother worked as a nurse and decorations designer for a department store. His father was a heavy gambler, but a very intelligent man.

Dr. Strauss seems to have inherited his father's intelligence and his mother's creativity, combining them into a mind to be reckoned with. His family moved to Catlin, Illinois, when James was in the second grade, where he spent the rest of his childhood and youth.

He lived a rather normal childhood, playing baseball with boys in the neighborhood and listening to The Shadow and The Lone Ranger at night on the radio with his family. He displayed a sharp mind even while in high school, graduating as salutatorian in his class and voted "most likely to succeed" by his fellow students.

James Strauss died on March 19, 2014.

Dr. Strauss's father was a Disciples of Christ member and his mother a Baptist, but neither attended church during James' childhood. One day James was invited to the Catlin Church of Christ by a consumer at the grocery store he worked at as a youth. James went, was converted, and brought his parents. Upon his conversion, James' father quit gambling, and, as a consequence, their family grew closer. James was mentored by the elders at that church, who taught him Biblical study methods and Greek.

When James graduated from high school, he went to Cincinnati Christian College to study under R. C. Foster and Grayson Ensign. He then graduated from Christian Theological Seminary and studied under Walter Sykes. By the time he finished his time as a student, he had collected over 500 hours of graduate credit because his mentor died unexpectedly right before he was about to graduate with his 1st doctorate and the program that he was a part of collapsed, so he had to start over. He earned a Bachelor of Arts and Master's degree from Butler University, a Bachelor of Divinity from Christian Theological Seminary in 1960, and a Master of Theology from the Chicago Graduate School of Theology. He fulfilled his Ph.D. candidacy requirements at Indiana University, but due to a change over in the faculty from one year to the next he did not finish the degree. He does have a Doctor of Ministry from Eden Theological Seminary, Webster Groves, Missouri.

Dr. Strauss became Associate Professor of Theology and Philosophy at Lincoln Christian Seminary in 1967 after working for many years as a pastor. The position had opened up because the professor previously occupying the related position had been released because of the unorthodox views that he held.

The student body at the time protested this move, as the released professor was popular among the students. Only later, however, did they realize what they had received in return. Strauss went on to very nearly be the seminary, as he taught most of the classes offered in a range of programs. One year the Seminary catalog listed him as teaching forty-seven courses. There is a cassette tape recording from 1977 of Dr. Strauss listing and briefly describing the classes he would be offering one year, which took over an hour to finish. Most of his syllabi were approximately 100 pages in length, single-spaced, nonetheless. He taught classes on Aristotle, Plato, Descartes, Hegel, linguistics, artificial intelligence and the mind, philosophy of science, Biblical exegesis, preaching, theories of knowledge, astrophysics in relation to Christianity, apologetics, archaeology, the nature of man, creative imagination, the Enlightenment, Immanuel Kant, pluralism, classical philosophy, history of philosophy, classical theology, evolution, theology of sin, theology of promise, etc. Upon his retirement in 1994, he was given the honorary title of Professor Emeritus of Theology and Philosophy. Dr. Strauss is a prolific writer, and has written tens of thousands of pages between his books and essays on topics related to the ones listed above.
