= First Presbyterian Church (Chattanooga, Tennessee) =

Historic church in Tennessee, United States

- First Presbyterian Church of Chattanooga
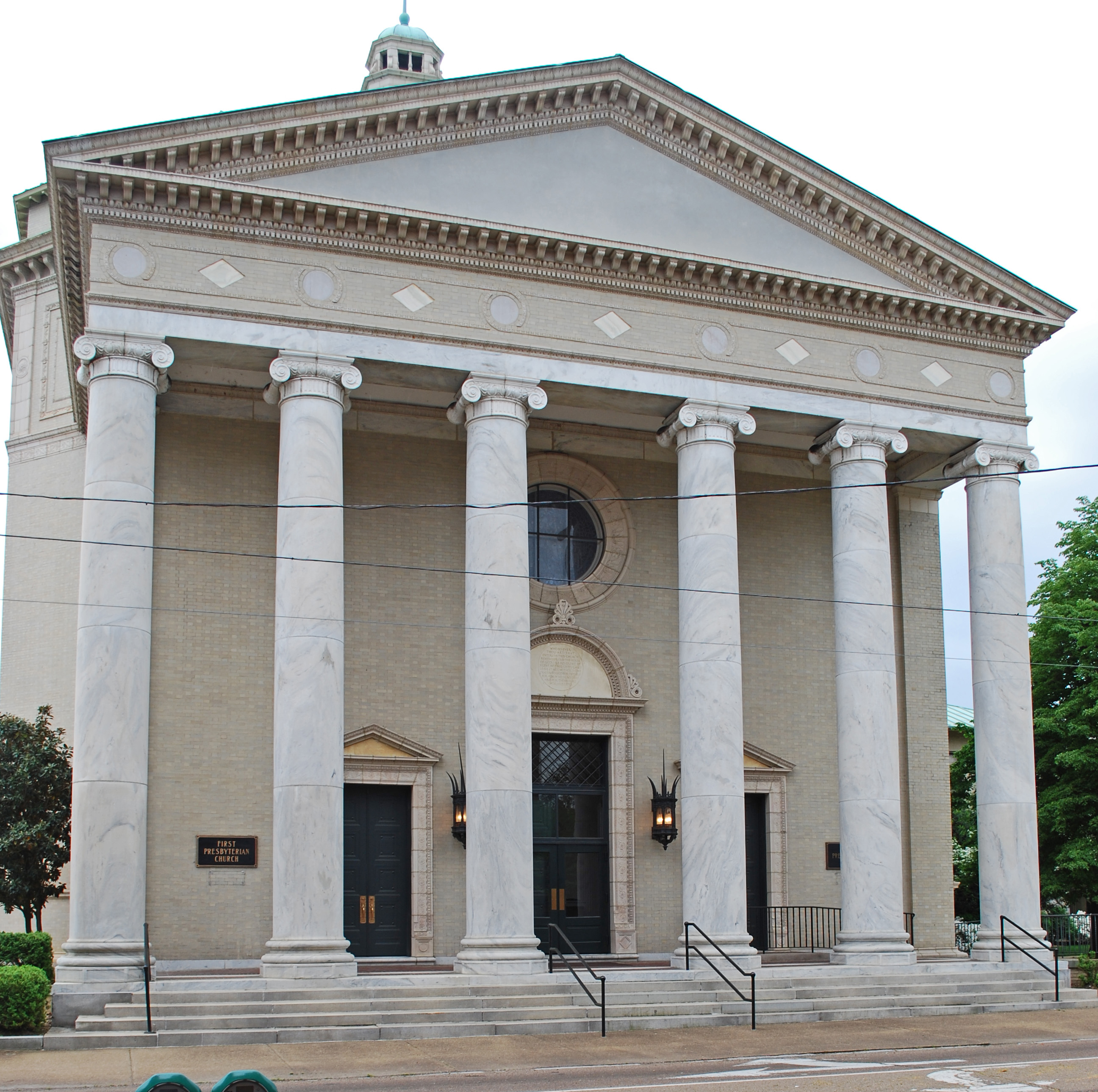
- First Presbyterian Church
- Location: 554 McCallie Ave., Chattanooga, Tennessee
- Country: United States
- Denomination: Presbyterian Church in America
- Previous denomination: Presbyterian Church in the United States
- Churchmanship: Evangelical, Reformed
- Website: 1stpresbyterian.com

History
- Former name: Presbyterian Church in Chattanooga (1840-1871)
- Founded: 21 June 1840
- First Presbyterian Church
- U.S. National Register of Historic Places
- Location within Tennessee Location within the United States
- Coordinates: 35°2′51″N 85°18′8″W
- Area: 1.3 acres (0.53 ha)
- Built: 1910
- Architect: McKim, Mead & White et al.
- Architectural style: Classical Revival
- NRHP reference No.: 09000955
- Added to NRHP: November 18, 2009

The First Presbyterian Church in Chattanooga, Tennessee, located at 554 McCallie Avenue, is a historic, downtown congregation of the Presbyterian Church in America (PCA). It was the first Christian congregation founded in the city.

== History ==
First Presbyterian Church was formed as the Presbyterian Church in Chattanooga on June 21, 1840, under the leadership of missionaries who had previously served at the Brainerd Mission to the Cherokee. After the "Trail of Tears" the missionaries returned to Chattanooga and began to work among the English, Scots-Irish, and Welsh in the community and helped plant the new church. At first, the congregation worshiped in a log cabin. Its first purpose-built church, completed in 1845, was on the west side of Walnut Street near Third Street. That building was the home of First Presbyterian until the mid-1850s, when it was replaced by a new brick church building on the northeast corner of Seventh and Market streets. During the Union Army occupation of Chattanooga in 1863, that church was stripped to serve as a military hospital. For a period after the Civil War, worship services were held in the minister's home.

Through the years, the congregation grew. It adopted the "First Presbyterian" name in 1871, when Second Presbyterian Church was organized. From the 1880s until 1910, when its current building was opened, First Presbyterian was located at the southwest corner of Georgia Avenue and Seventh Street. There have been thirteen pastors of the church including notable clergy such as Thomas McCallie (whose sons founded The McCallie School), Jonathan Bachman (former Confederate chaplain, former Moderator of the Presbyterian Church in the United States, 1910), James Fowle, and Ben Haden. Michael A. Milton served the church from 2001 to 2008, when he became president and professor of practical theology at Reformed Theological Seminary in Charlotte, North Carolina. The Reverend Michael Preg served as the interim pastor before the church called Reverend Timothy Tinsley. The current senior pastor is Gabriel Fluhrer.

First Presbyterian minister Joseph Glass Venable, who served the church from 1924 until his death in 1928, was the first minister to preach a worship service on a local radio station. A congregation history states that the program series he initiated "is believed to be the longest continuing radio program in the United States". One of his successors, Ben Haden, who served First Presbyterian from 1967 to 1999, was later to inaugurate the long-running radio ministry "Changed Lives" on WFLI in Chattanooga.

== Church building ==
The church building was designed by notable architect Stanford White and was built in 1910 at a cost of $152,000. It was listed on the National Register of Historic Places in December 2009. A centennial dedication of the sanctuary was held on December 18, 2010. Pastors or representatives of deceased pastors each spoke during the service of dedication.

== Missions ==
The congregation has sponsored other local congregations in Chattanooga and in other parts of the United States. The congregation has a history of support for foreign missions and is active today, through partnerships with other churches and agencies, in numerous parts of the world. The church sponsors a year-round camp and conference center, Camp Vesper Point. It supports 63 missionaries, 5 church planting partnerships in 31 countries.

== Gallery ==
Historic American Buildings Survey 1933

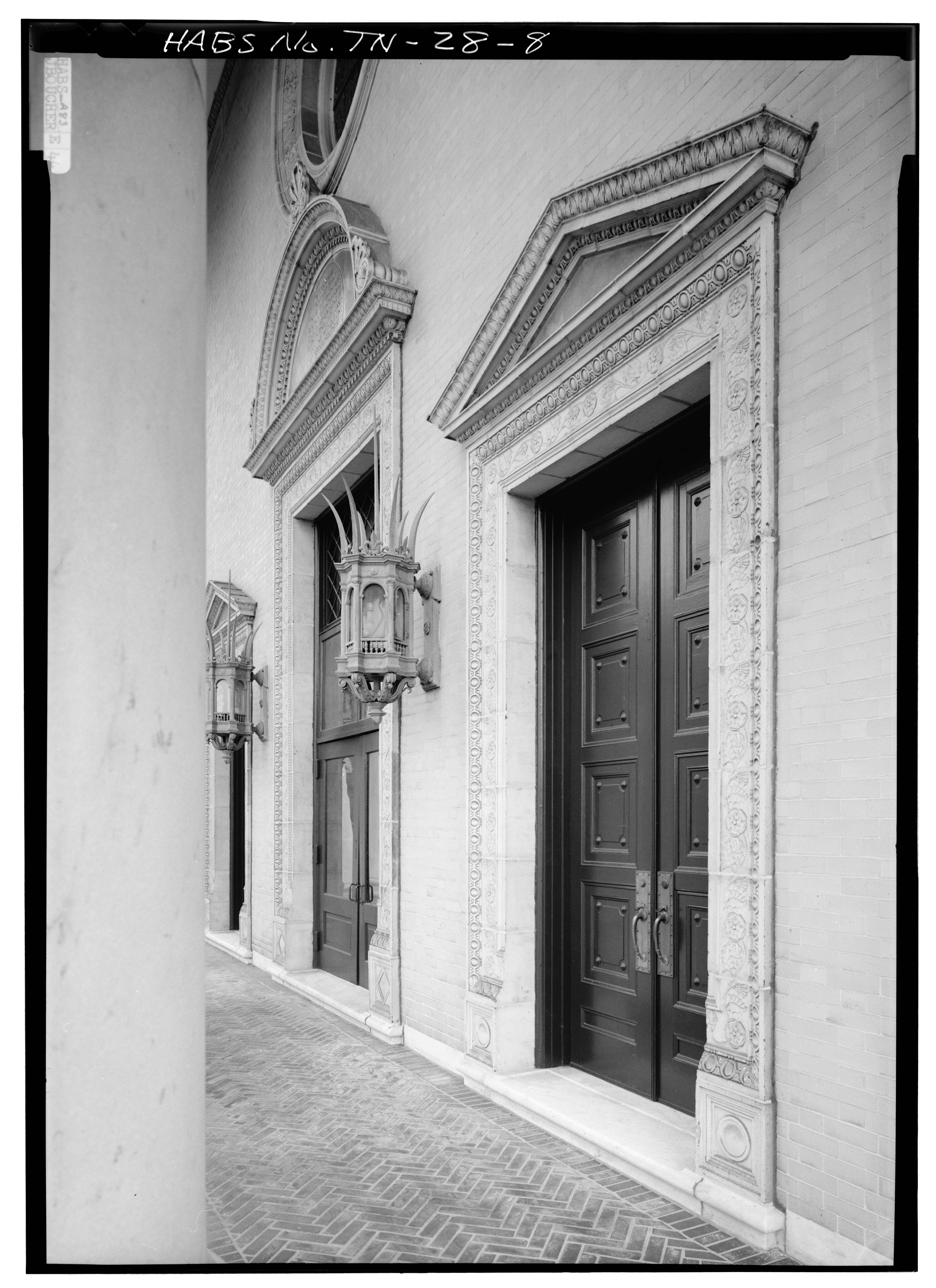

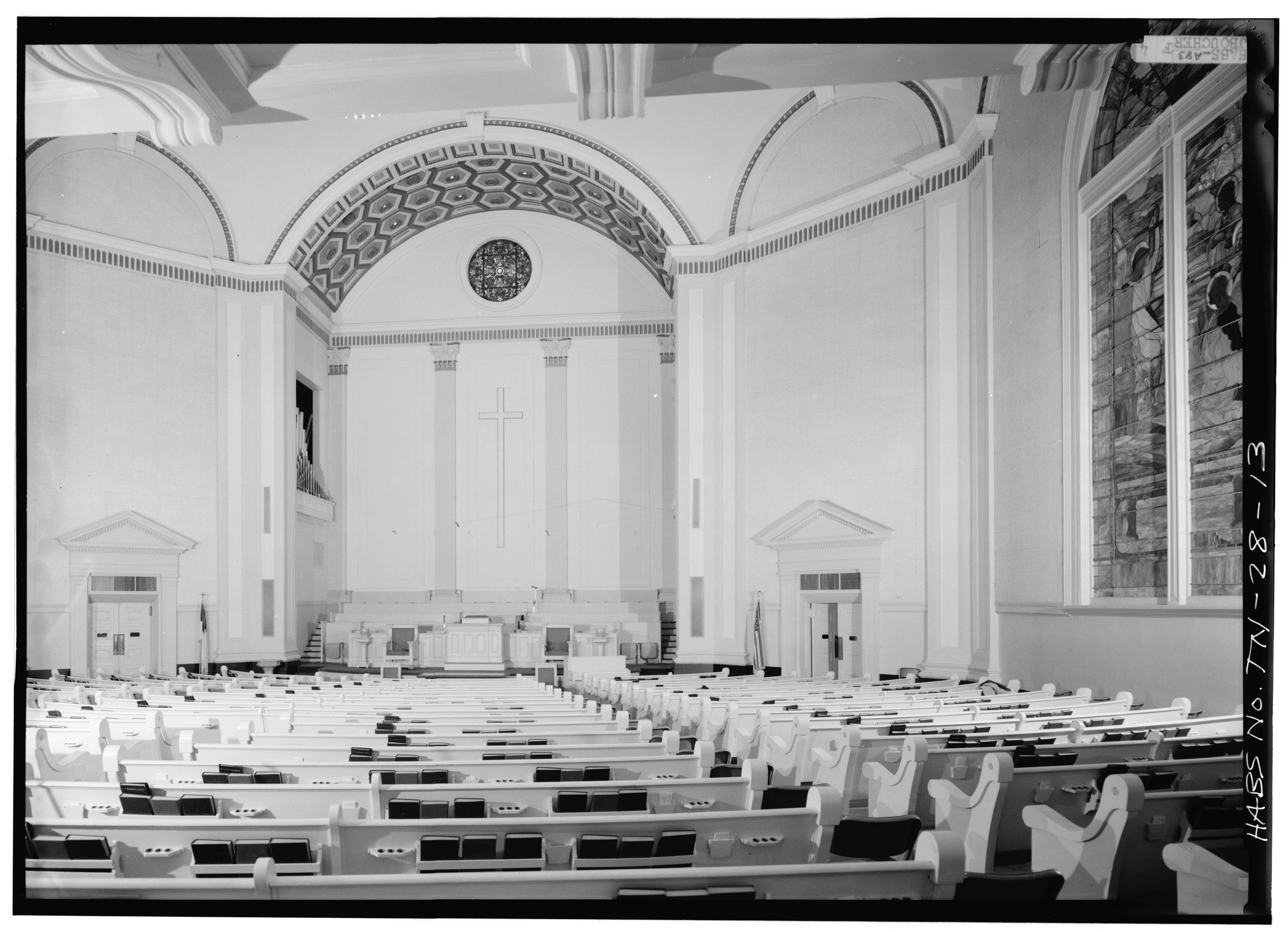

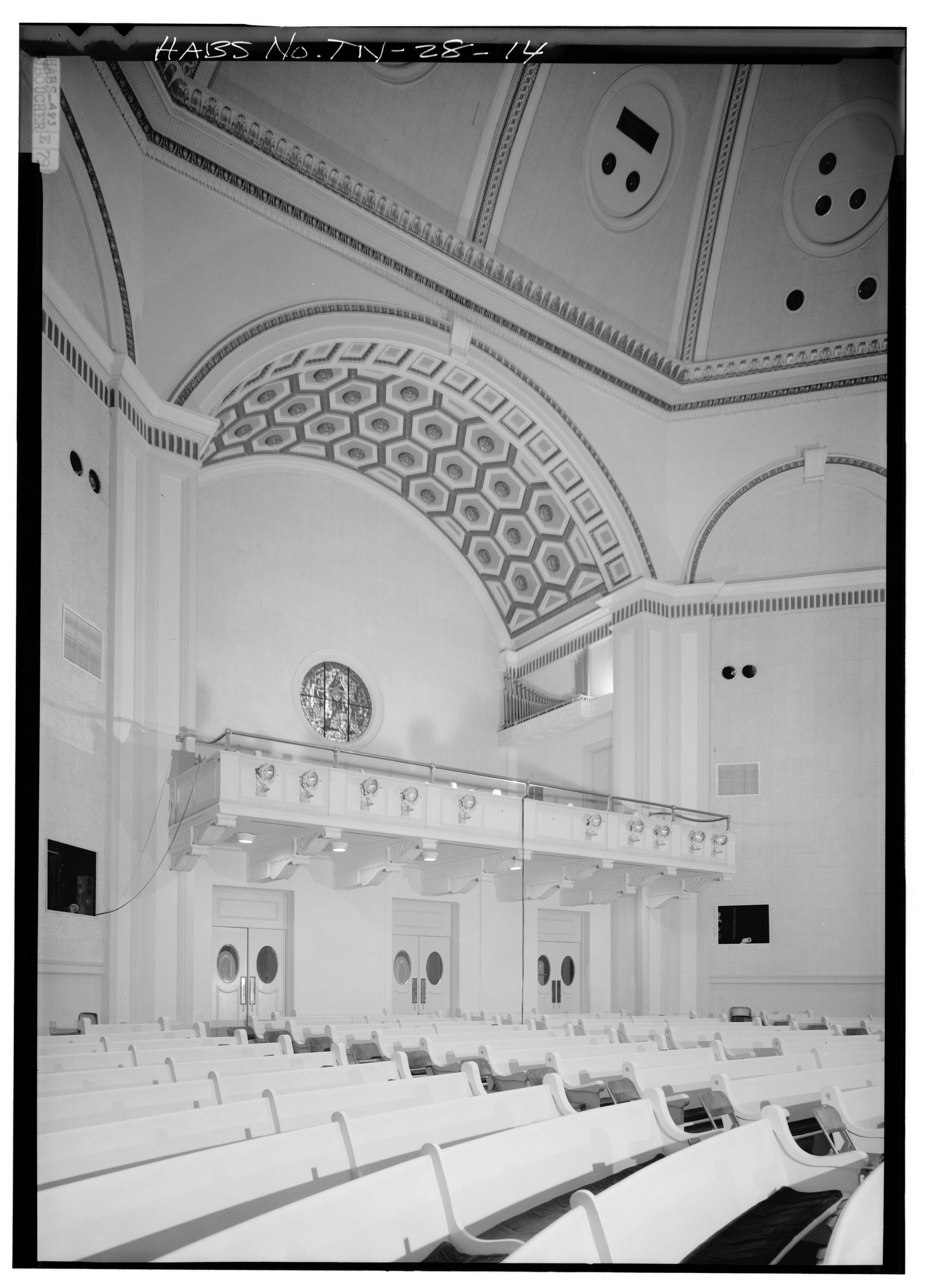

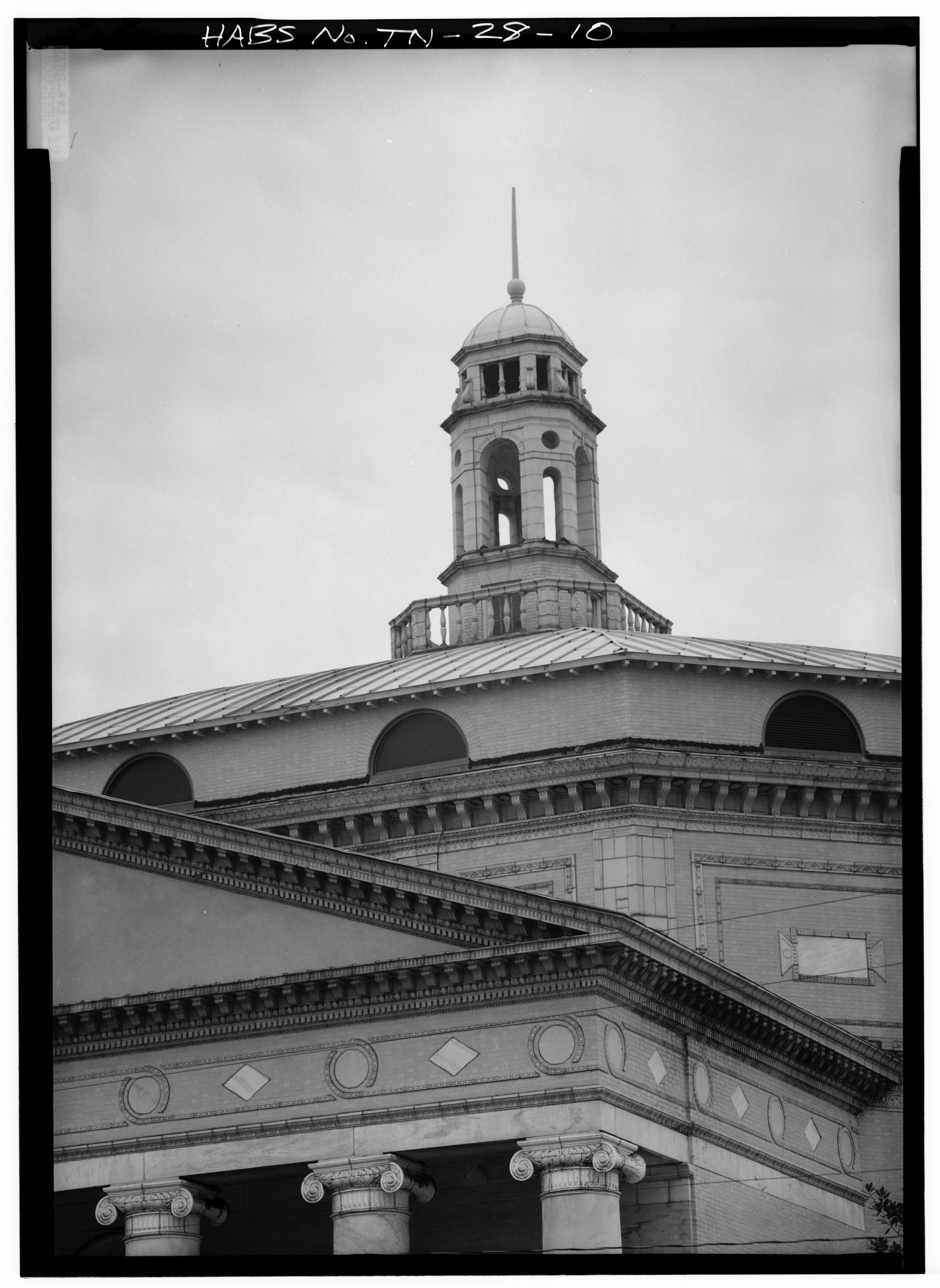
