= D. James Kennedy Ministries =

D. James Kennedy Ministries (DJKM), formerly “Coral Ridge Ministries,” is an evangelical Christian media outreach founded by minister and evangelist D. James Kennedy in 1974. The group is listed as an anti-LGBT hate group by the Southern Poverty Law Center (SPLC) due to statements and positions which the SPLC describes as falsely demeaning gay and lesbian people.

Best known in the 1980s and 1990s for its flagship one-hour television program, The Coral Ridge Hour, which claimed an audience of three million nationwide, D. James Kennedy Ministries now broadcasts a weekly half-hour TV program Truths That Transform. Hosted by ministry president, Rev. Robert J. Pacienza, Truths That Transform airs nationwide on four cable networks and seeks to give a “biblical perspective” on “moral and cultural controversies.” The program includes interviews, news segments, and video excerpts from sermons preached by D. James Kennedy (1930–2007), the former senior minister of Coral Ridge Presbyterian Church in Fort Lauderdale, Florida.

DJKM airs sermons preached by Kennedy on its weekly half-hour program, Kennedy Classics. Truth in Action Radio is an Internet-only program featuring weekly messages from Kennedy.

== History ==
DJKM began in 1974 as “Coral Ridge Ministries Media,” the media outreach of D. James Kennedy. The ministry was re-branded as “Truth in Action Ministries” in 2011.

At Kennedy’s direction, the ministry produced and broadcast Who Is This Jesus?, a one-hour television special aired on CBS affiliates at Christmas 2001. The program, co-hosted by Kennedy with actor Dean Jones, reached a claimed 20 million viewers, with its Easter follow-up, Who Is This Jesus: Is He Risen? The program offered scholarly viewpoints on the reliability of the Gospels, especially the resurrection claim. Associated Press religion writer Richard Ostling contrasted the broadcast to the 2000 Peter Jennings-hosted ABC News documentary, The Search for Jesus, contending the program “achieved more journalistic success than Jennings at one point” by providing a broader cross-section of experts.

== Programs ==
=== Center for Christian Statesmanship ===
The ministry launched the Washington, D.C.–based D. James Kennedy Center for Christian Statesmanship (CCS) in 1995. A Capitol Hill outreach to lawmakers and congressional staff, the Center is a discipleship and evangelism outreach to train and equip “Christian statesman.” It awards a "Distinguished Christian Statesman Award" annually to high-profile Christian political leaders. Past award recipients include Mike Pence, Tom DeLay, Sam Brownback, John Ashcroft, and Mike Huckabee.

=== Center for Reclaiming America for Christ ===
DJKM founded its social action branch, The Center for Reclaiming America for Christ, in 1996. With an emphasis on cultural engagement, the ministry also hosted Reclaiming America for Christ conferences in Fort Lauderdale to inspire Christians to become involved in politics and Christian social action. Speakers included former vice president Dan Quayle, then-Sen. John Ashcroft, House Majority Leader Dick Armey, Jerry Falwell, and Judge Roy Moore. DJKM closed the Center for Reclaiming America for Christ in April 2007.

=== Center for Christian Leadership ===
In 2018, DJKM began the D. James Kennedy Center for Christian Leadership, as an initiative of its Center for Christian Statesmanship in Washington, D.C. The Center for Christian Leadership provides comprehensive leadership training to those preparing to seek elected office and to those seeking other areas of service in the public policy arena.

== Leadership ==
Pacienza, who was mentored by Kennedy, is Senior Pastor of Coral Ridge Presbyterian Church (CRPC) and served on the DJKM Board of Directors prior to being named president and chief executive officer (CEO) in June 2022. Pacienza has served as CRPC Senior Pastor since 2016. The author of the forthcoming book, The Hope Of The World: Christian Cultural Engagement in a Secular Age, Pacienza said his ministry philosophy is to "equip gospel-centered, culture-shaping Christians." Pacienza succeeds Frank Wright who served as president and CEO of DJKM from 2015 to 2022. Wright, formerly president and chief operating officer (COO) of the Salem Media Group, also served as president and CEO of the National Religious Broadcasters for 10 years, and as the founding executive director of the Center for Christian Statesmanship, at its launch by DJKM in 1995.

== Awards ==
The National Religious Broadcasters association (NRB) named The Coral Ridge Hour “Television Program of the Year” in 2003 and gave its “Best Radio Teaching Program for 2004” to the ministry’s daily radio program, Truths That Transform. NRB inducted Kennedy into its Hall of Fame in 2005.

== Dismissed defamation lawsuit against the SPLC ==
DJKM filed a defamation suit in federal court against the Southern Poverty Law Center (SPLC) on Aug. 22, 2017 after the group listed the ministry as an “anti-LGBT hate group.” The SPLC has exposed and sued white-supremacist groups under the direction of its founder, Morris Dees, but began focusing on immigration control groups and opponents of gay rights and same-sex marriage in the 2000s. It claims that DJKM engages in “anti-LGBT organizing and ideology . . . [and] demonizes LGBT people as threats to children, society and often public health.”

The DJKM suit alleges the SPLC "illegally trafficked in false and misleading descriptions of the services offered by DJKM and committed defamation against DJKM arising from the publication and distribution of false information that libels the ministry's reputation and subjects the ministry to disgrace, ridicule, odium, and contempt in the estimation of the public," a ministry statement said.

On February 21, 2018, a federal magistrate judge recommended that the suit be dismissed with prejudice, concluding that D. James Kennedy Ministries could not show that it had been libeled.

On September 19, 2019, the lawsuit was dismissed by Judge Myron H. Thompson, who ruled that the "SPLC's labeling of the group as [a hate group] is protected by the First Amendment."

On June 27, 2022, the Supreme Court declined to hear the case, ending the legal battle.

=== SPLC Response ===
In response, SPLC president J. Richard Cohen, said the lawsuit is "meritless" and that the ministry’s Bible-based views are not immune from criticism. He added: "We have a First Amendment right to express our opinions, just as Coral Ridge has a right to express its opinions."
