= Chelsea Chen =

American organist and composer

Chelsea Chen (born December 30, 1983, in San Diego) is an internationally renowned American organist and composer.

Chen has been successful in establishing a concert career in North America, Europe and Asia. She has composed several original compositions, and has adapted music ranging from major classical repertoire to video game soundtracks to Taiwanese folk songs for the organ and other instruments.

== Education and career ==
Chen began piano studies at a young age, studying with Jane Smisor Bastien and Lori Bastien Vickers. At age 15, she began studying organ, first with Leslie Robb, and later with Monte Maxwell, Chapel Organist for the United States Naval Academy. After only two years of lessons, she was accepted into the Juilliard School, where she studied first with John Weaver and then with Paul Jacobs, completing her undergraduate degree in 2005 and her graduate degree in 2006. In 2006, she was accepted for a Fulbright Fellowship and spent the next year composing and performing in Taiwan, where she played an important role in increasing exposure to the pipe organ in that country. In 2007, she was accepted into the Artist Diploma program at Yale University, where she studied with Thomas Murray. She performs a wide-ranging repertoire, and in addition to works from the standard repertory, she has premiered both her own compositions and works of fellow Juilliard composers, such as Teddy Niedermaier and Ola Gjeilo.

Chen has been the recipient of numerous awards. In 2003, she won the Region IX regional convention of the American Guild of Organists. In 2004, she made it to the final round of the Augustana/Reuter National Organ Undergraduate Competition, returning next year to win first place. While at Juilliard, she was awarded the John Erskine Prize for scholastic and artistic distinction.

In 2005, she recorded her first CD and DVD at Heinz Chapel in Pittsburgh. In 2004 and 2006, she was invited to perform at the AGO National Conventions in Los Angeles and Chicago. In addition to her academic studies, she maintains a busy performing career both in the United States and abroad. She has recently performed in San Diego, Dallas, New York, Taiwan, Hong Kong, and Singapore, among other places. Notable upcoming performances include her debut at the Disney Concert Hall in Los Angeles, and a performance of Messiaen's "La Nativite du Seigneur" at Christ Church in New Haven, Connecticut, in celebration of the 100th anniversary of his birth.

From 2013-2017, Chen was Organist- and Artist-in-Residence at Coral Ridge Presbyterian Church in Fort Lauderdale, Florida. In addition to her role as organist, Chen also directed the annual Concert Series at the church. She currently serves as Artist-in-Residence at Emmanuel Presbyterian Church in Manhattan, New York City.
