= George W. Knight III =

American Theologian (1931–2021)

- Born: George William Knight; December 16, 1931; Sanford, Florida
- Died: October 11, 2021 (aged 89); Lake Wylie, South Carolina
- Occupations: New Testament scholar, theologian, author, preacher, and churchman
- Title: Professor Emeritus of New Testament at Greenville Presbyterian Theological Seminary
- Board member of: Former President of the Evangelical Theological Society

Academic background
- Education: Westminster Theological Seminary
- Alma mater: Free University of Amsterdam (PhD)
- Thesis: (1968)

George William Knight III (December 16, 1931 – October 11, 2021) was an ordained minister in the Orthodox Presbyterian Church. He was a theologian, author, preacher, churchman, and adjunct professor of New Testament at Greenville Presbyterian Theological Seminary in Taylors, South Carolina. Formerly, he was the founding Dean and Professor of New Testament at Knox Theological Seminary. Prior to his appointment at Knox Theological Seminary, he taught New Testament and New Testament Greek at Covenant Theological Seminary in St. Louis, Missouri. As a pastor, he planted Covenant Presbyterian Church in Naples, Florida and has served numerous other local churches in the Presbyterian Church in America and the Orthodox Presbyterian Church. A former president of the Evangelical Theological Society, he has also taught and preached the Bible at many other seminaries and churches around the world. He has authored several works, most notably The Pastoral Epistles and a short commentary of Timothy and Titus as included in the Baker Commentary on the Bible. He received his theological doctorate from Free University of Amsterdam in 1968. Dr. Knight was a member of the General Assembly-appointed Ad Interim Committee to study the number of ordained offices in the Presbyterian Church in America according to Scripture. His Ad Interim Report of the Number of Offices by George W. Knight III was incorporated into the polity of the Presbyterian Church in America. He also served on an ad interim committee to study the issue of marriage, divorce and remarriage, which brought about the 1992 publication of a Position Paper of the Presbyterian Church in America on Remarriage and Divorce, 1992..

In 1977, he argued in a book about gender roles that the role relationship of men and women is theologically analogous to the subordination of the Son to the Father in the Trinity. Australian theologian Kevin Giles has more recently responded that complementarians have "reinvented" the doctrine of the Trinity to support their views of men and women, suggesting that some complementarians have adopted a heretical view of the Trinity similar to Arianism. Knight released a response to "evangelical feminists" in a 2009 book. Knight's contributions to the complementarian view of the role relationship of men and women, and especially as it is applied to the issue of the ordination of women to the ministry, have greatly influenced the founding of the Council on Biblical Manhood and Womanhood, where he served for many years as a council member.

== Works ==
=== Books ===
- Knight, George W. (1957). The Authorship of the Pastoral Epistles (Th.M.). Westminster Theological Seminary. OCLC 9036253.
- ——— (1968). The Faithful Sayings in the Pastoral Letters (Ph.D.). Kampen: J.H. Kok. OCLC 604091396.
- ——— (1969). The Faithful Sayings in the Pastoral Letters. An International Library of Philosophy and Theology. Biblical and theological studies (1st general ed.). Nutley, NJ: Presbyterian and Reformed Publishing Company. OCLC 808562694.
- ——— (1973). The Theological Significance of Kerygmatic Diversity in the Marcan Interpretation of the Death of Jesus (Diss. (unknown)). Louisville, KY: Southern Baptist Theological Seminary. OCLC 315487563.
- ——— (1975). The Role Relation of Man and Woman and the Teaching/Ruling Functions in the Church. St. Louis, MO: Knight. OCLC 3337724.
- ——— (1977). The New Testament Teaching on the Role Relationship of Men and Women. Grand Rapids, MI: Baker Book House. ISBN 978-0-801-05383-2. OCLC 3337606.
- ——— (1979). The Faithful Sayings in the Pastoral Letters. Baker Biblical Monograph (Reissue ed.). Grand Rapids, MI: Baker Book House. ISBN 978-0-801-05402-0. OCLC 799422509.
- ——— (1983). Abortion: How Does God's Word Regard the Unborn Child?. St. Louis, MO: Knight. OCLC 9905280.
- ——— (1984). Authenteo in Reference to Women in 1 Timothy 2.12. New Testament Studies. Vol. 30. London: Cambridge University Press. OCLC 162103112.
- ——— (1985). The Role Relationship of Men and Women: New Testament teaching. Chicago, IL: Moody Press. ISBN 978-0-802-47369-1. OCLC 11785448.
- ——— (1988). Prophecy in the New Testament. Dallas, TX: Presbyterian Heritage Publications. OCLC 19437025.
- ——— (1992). The Pastoral Epistles: a commentary on the Greek text. New International Greek Testament Commentary. Grand Rapids, MI: Eerdmans. ISBN 978-0-853-64532-0. OCLC 25411604.
- ———; Ray, Rayburn W. (1998). Quicknotes Bible Dictionary. Uhrichsville, OH: Barbour Publishing. ISBN 978-1-602-60442-1. OCLC 244766973.
- ———; Ray, Rayburn W. (2002). Quicknotes Bible Concordance. Uhrichsville, OH: Barbour Publishing. ISBN 978-1-602-60443-8. OCLC 244766493.
- ——— (2002). Layman's Bible Concordance. Uhrichsville, OH: Barbour Publishing. ISBN 978-1-616-26979-1. OCLC 788244635.
- ———; Ray, Rayburn W. (2003). Quicknotes Bible Handbook. Uhrichsville, OH: Barbour Publishing. ISBN 978-1-602-60442-1. OCLC 244766973.
- ———; Ray, Rayburn W. (2005). The Illustrated Everyday Bible Companion: an all-in-one resource for everyday Bible study. Uhrichsville, OH: Barbour Publishing. ISBN 978-1-593-10905-9. OCLC 62324344.
- ———; Ray, Rayburn W. (2007). The Illustrated Guide to Bible Customs & Curiosities. Uhrichsville, OH: Barbour Publishing. ISBN 978-1-593-10703-1. OCLC 138513469.
- ——— (2008). The Illustrated Bible Handbook. Uhrichsville, OH: Barbour Publishing. ISBN 978-1-602-60115-4. OCLC 302284021.
- ——— (2011). The Holy Land. Illustrated Bible Handbooks. Uhrichsville, OH: Barbour Publishing. ISBN 978-1-602-60644-9.
- ———; Ray, Rayburn W. (2014). The Barbour Bible Reference Companion: An All-In-One Resource for Everyday Bible Study. Uhrichsville, OH: Barbour Publishing. ISBN 978-1-630-58662-1.
- ——— (2014). The Illustrated Guide To God. Uhrichsville, OH: Barbour Publishing. ISBN 978-1-624-16336-4.

=== Articles and chapters ===
- ——— (April 9, 1976). "Male and Female Related He Them". Christianity Today. 20 (14): 705, 709.
- ——— (January 1984). "AΘenteΩ in Reference to Women in 1 Timothy 2.12". New Testament Studies. 30 (1): 143–157. doi:10.1017/S0028688500007049. S2CID 170630627.
- ——— (March 1996). "The Scriptures were Written for our Instruction". Journal of the Evangelical Theological Society. 39 (1): 3–13.
