= Coral Ridge Presbyterian Church =

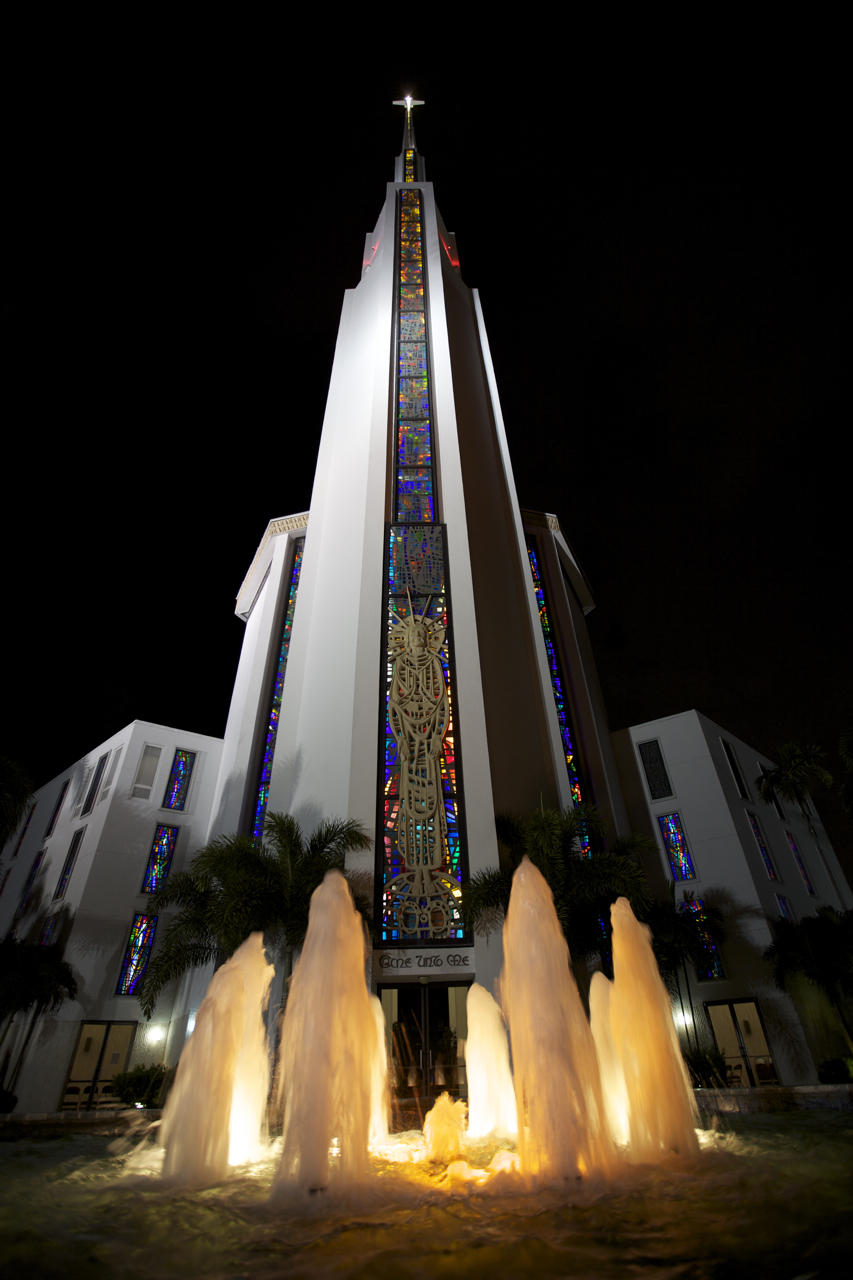

- Location within Florida
- 26°11′45.2″N 80°06′46.4″W
- Location: 5555 N Federal Hwy; Fort Lauderdale, Florida, U.S.
- Denomination: Presbyterian Church in America
- Previous denomination: Presbyterian Church in the United States; Evangelical Presbyterian Church (United States)
- Website: http://www.crpc.org

History
- Founded: 1960
- Founder: D. James Kennedy

Architecture
- Architect: Harold E. Wagoner
- Style: Modern

Coral Ridge Presbyterian Church is a Christian church within the Presbyterian Church in America located in Fort Lauderdale, Florida. It was founded in 1960 by D. James Kennedy (1930–2007), who served as the church's senior pastor until shortly before his death.

The present church building, which seats 2,300 persons, was dedicated on February 3, 1974, by evangelist Billy Graham. It became affiliated with the Presbyterian Church in America denomination on May 16, 1978. Coral Ridge was originally a member congregation of the Presbyterian Church in the United States, the so-called "Southern" church before 1983.

Beginning in 1978 under pastor D. James Kennedy, the church's weekly services were televised as the Coral Ridge Hour, eventually reaching a nationwide audience of more than 3 million. While the production of new broadcasts from the church was discontinued in 2007 after Kennedy's death, his media ministry D. James Kennedy Ministries now airs excerpts of his sermons, along with current news segments, on its nationwide weekly half-hour TV program Christ Meets Culture.

The Westminster Academy and Knox Theological Seminary, also in Fort Lauderdale, are educational ministries of the church. W. Tullian Tchividjian, a grandson of Billy Graham, succeeded Kennedy as senior pastor of the church, serving from April 2009 to June 2015. In June 2016, Rob Pacienza officially assumed the role of senior pastor.

== History ==
The church was founded by D. James Kennedy on May 22, 1960, who began with a congregation of 45 persons attending a typical Sunday service at a rented elementary school auditorium. Kennedy developed the "Evangelism Explosion" ("EE") method of evangelism in the 1960s, which emphasizes the training of church laypeople to share their faith by home visitation in the community. Coral Ridge became the fastest-growing Presbyterian church in the U.S. in the 1960s and had 1,366 members by 1968. Outgrowing its first church built in the early 1960s, construction of the church's present 2,300-seat sanctuary, surmounted by a 303-foot (92 m) tower and designed in a modern style, was undertaken in the early 1970s, making it one of the tallest churches in the United States. On December 21, 1973, the first services were held in the church's new building. In February 1974, the sanctuary was formally dedicated by Billy Graham. By the 1980s, the church's membership had grown to a few thousand persons. Evangelism Explosion was the subject of Kennedy's doctoral dissertation, who said he earned a Ph.D. "to dispel the idea there is an inconsistency between evangelism and education...evangelical ministers [need] to be thoroughly educated and equipped to meet on equal terms anyone with whom they come in contact". A 1970 film, Like a Mighty Army, starring actor Chris Robinson as Kennedy, portrayed the Evangelism Explosion story at the church.

By the 1980s, the church's television ministry had a weekly audience of 3.5 million viewers, as the Coral Ridge Hour aired on more than 400 stations and four cable networks, including the Trinity Broadcasting Network, The Inspiration Network (INSP) and the NRB Network, as well as broadcast to more than 150 countries on the Armed Forces Network. Rev. George Grant became executive director of the ministry on February 1, 1990.

Kennedy last preached at Coral Ridge Presbyterian Church on December 24, 2006, suffering a cardiac arrest four days later. His retirement was officially announced at the church on August 26, 2007, and he died in his home ten days later. In a statement following news of Kennedy's retirement, the church announced the development of the D. James Kennedy Legacy website in tribute to the life of the Christian evangelist.

=== Post-Kennedy ===
The church's senior pastor from 2009 to 2015 was Tullian Tchividjian, a native Floridian born in Jacksonville. Named after third century theologian Tertullian, he is a grandson of famed evangelist Billy Graham. Previously, he was the pastor of New City Presbyterian Church, an Evangelical Presbyterian Church congregation meeting at a high school in nearby Coconut Creek. He was invited on January 12, 2009, to become Coral Ridge Presbyterian Church's senior minister, as part of a merger of the two congregations. The Coral Ridge congregation approved Tchividjian's appointment and merger of the two churches by vote on March 15, 2009, with 920 of the 1,014 members present voting in favor. Tchividjian was installed as the church's senior pastor on Easter Sunday, April 12, 2009. He studied philosophy at Columbia International University and earned a divinity degree at Reformed Theological Seminary. His writings include Do I Know God? Finding Certainty in Life's Most Important Relationship, Unfashionable: Making a Difference in the World by Being Different, Surprised by Grace: God's Relentless Pursuit of Rebels and Jesus + Nothing = Everything. At the beginning of 2009, the church had 2,200 members and weekly attendance averaged 1,800 persons.

On June 21, 2015, Tchividjian announced that he had resigned as senior pastor at Coral Ridge Presbyterian after admitting having an affair himself, following an affair on the part of his wife. After almost a year-long search, Rob Pacienza, who had been executive pastor under Tchividjian, was named as Coral Ridge's third senior pastor.

== Music ==
The church has had a rich history of traditional music, especially with the Ruffatti pipe organ at its heart, beginning with the start of the church, more than 50 years ago. With the appointment of Tchividjian the musical style shifted toward a contemporary style, and for the first time it became more commonplace than traditional. Shortly after assuming his role, current Senior Pastor, Rob Pacienza reintroduced a traditional service led by the choir, under the musical direction of Bernie Gonzalez, and accompanied by Chelsea Chen on the Rufatti on Sunday, October 30, 2016.

The large Fratelli Ruffatti pipe organ, built in 1974, has 6,600 pipes in 117 ranks. In 2004 the organ became expanded with the addition of 61 digital voices, resulting in the equivalent of 178 ranks altogether. Samuel Metzger, the organist from 2003 until his resignation on September 24, 2009, has recorded seven CDs of music on the Rufatti instrument. The organ is also regularly featured on the world-renowned Joy of Music television programs of Diane Bish, one of the church's former organists, and is often heard on the Sacred Classics radio show and in recordings by the church's choir. Other former organists include Rebecca Owens, Colin Howland, and Garrett F. Martin. Beginning in early 2013, Chelsea Chen began playing occasionally for services as guest organist, and was officially appointed to the position of organist and artist in residence at the church until 2018. In January 2018, Dr. John L. Wilson, who previously directed the music ministry until his resignation in 2009, returned to CRPC to serve as the Director of Traditional Worship and The Coral Ridge Concert Series. On June 1st, 2025, Dr. Wilson retired while simultaneously being named Coral Ridge’s first Director Emeritus of the music ministry. On the same day, Michael Irvin began serving in the role of Director of Traditional Worship.

=== Discography ===
A number of phonograph records and compact discs of the choir and organ have been released since the 1970s, including:

Title	Artist(s)	Genre
Artistry at the Coral Ridge Organ	Diane Bish	organ
Be Still My Soul	Samuel Metzger	organ
The Best of Coral Ridge	Chancel Choir	choral
Christmas Festival	Diane Bish	organ
Fanfare!	Samuel Metzger	organ
His Truth is Marching On	Chancel Choir	choral
Hymns on the Coral Ridge Organ	Diane Bish	organ
Joy to the World!	Samuel Metzger	organ
King of Instruments	Samuel Metzger	organ
Majesty and Glory	Samuel Metzger	organ
Morning Has Broken	Chancel Choir	choral
Pipes and More Pipes	Diane Bish and St. Andrews Bagpipes	organ and bagpipes
Prayer and Meditation	Samuel Metzger	organ
Shout to the Lord!	Coral Ambassadors	choral
Toccata!	Samuel Metzger	organ
