= Evangelism Explosion =

Christian organization

- Abbreviation: EE
- Formation: 1972
- Founder: D. James Kennedy
- Type: Religious organizations
- Purpose: Discipleship
- Headquarters: Arden, North Carolina
- President: John B. Sorensen
- Website: evangelismexplosion.org

Evangelism Explosion (EE) is a Christian evangelistic discipleship ministry and training program.

== History ==
Evangelism Explosion was started in 1962 by D. James Kennedy, senior pastor of Coral Ridge Presbyterian Church. Evangelism Explosion became an incorporated organization in 1972.

In 1996, Tyndale House, published the 4th edition of Evangelism Explosion authored by D. James Kennedy on witnessing as a way of life, which was first published in January, 1970.

In 1997, Evangelism Explosion published the results of a study which shows that the method was viewed as "confrontational evangelism". As a result of this, Evangelism Explosion announced that it was "changing its approach to emphasize relationship-building and discipling new believers."

Evangelism Explosion has been published in a number of different forms, including Kids' EE, Hope For Kids in partnership with OneHope, Seniors' EE, Deaf EE, Classic EE, Faith Talks, EE ChangeMakers, Equip America, Prison EE, Weavers, Glasses For Missions, EE for Generations, and XEE. The latter two are designed especially for teens and young adults.

== Content ==
Evangelism Explosion is best known for its two "diagnostic questions" that users can ask non-Christians as a means of determining a "person's spiritual health", and of stimulating an evangelistic conversation:

1. Have you come to the place in your spiritual life where you can say you know for certain that if you were to die today you would go to heaven?
2. Suppose that you were to die today and stand before God and he were to say to you, "Why should I let you into my heaven?" what would you say?

After the diagnostic questions, the evangelist is encouraged to explain the gospel in terms of grace, man, God, Christ, and faith.

== Use ==
Evangelism Explosion's materials have been translated into over seventy languages. Jeff Noblit suggests that it is "probably the most used and copied soul-winning training course ever embraced by Southern Baptists," while Stan Guthrie suggests that it is "the best known and most widely used evangelistic training curriculum in church history." It is used by over 20,000 churches worldwide.

Evangelism Explosion officials claim that millions of people have come to Christ using the program. In 2011, 324,000 people worldwide were trained in the program, while over 7.25 million people reportedly made a profession of faith as a result of its use. Five years later, the organization claimed 10.7 million people professed faith in Christ in 2016.

== Evaluation ==
David L. Larsen suggests that Evangelism Explosion has "brought a quickening of the evangelistic pulse", and has "provided a most helpful and practical vehicle for witness." Larsen notes, however, that "not everyone is comfortable" with "its more vigorous 'button-holing'."

In a study done among non-Christian Thai people, all of them spoke negatively about the witnessing approach of EE. One respondent said,

I would be upset. It is ridiculous and strange. I do not know who will die first, the interrogator or me. I would simply walk away. I do not want anyone to talk about death. It is a depressive issue.
