= Ryan A. Haynes =

American politician (born 1985)

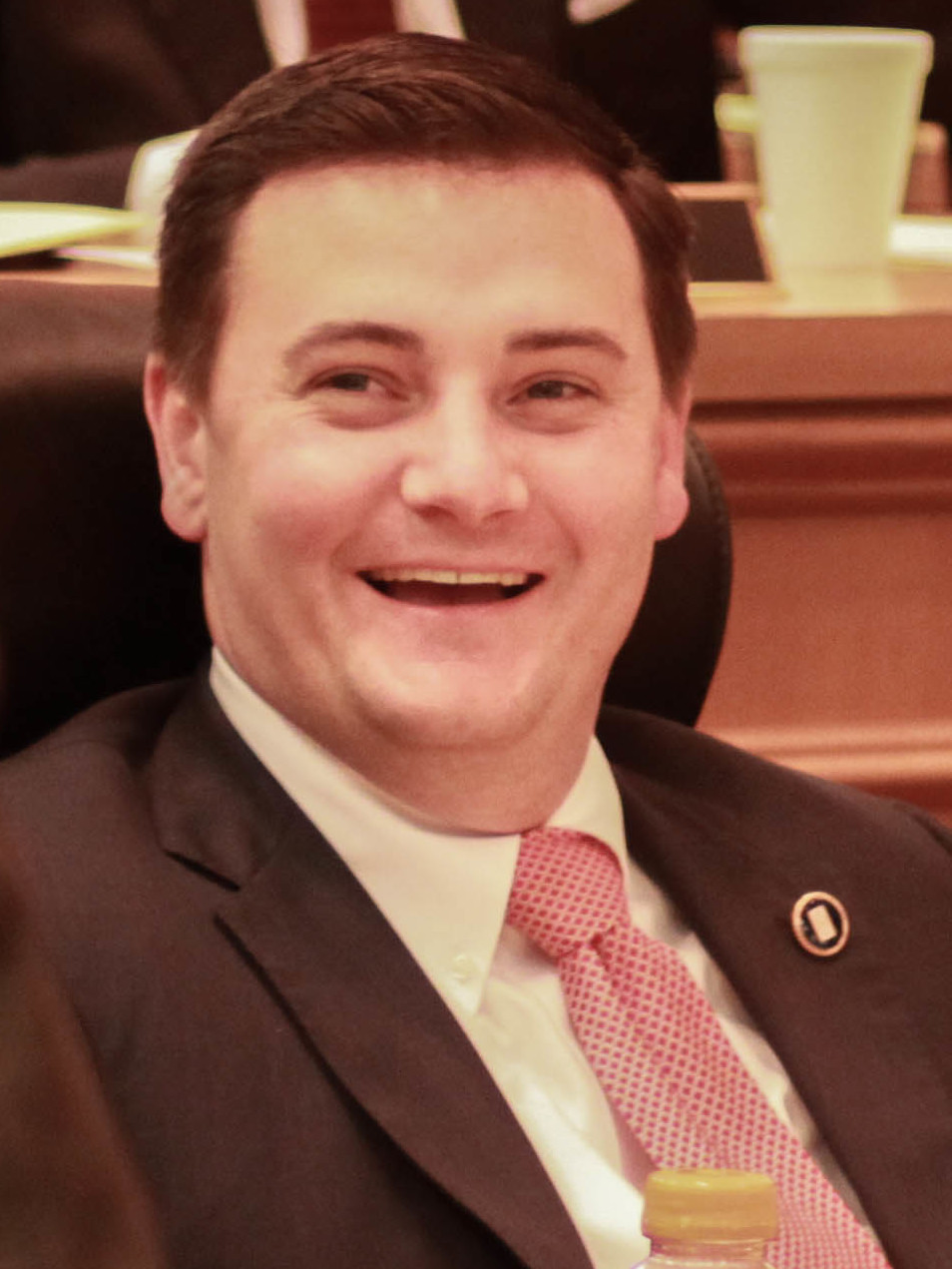

Chairman of the Tennessee Republican Party
- In office 2015–2016
- Preceded by: Chris Devaney
- Succeeded by: Scott Golden

Member of the Tennessee House of Representatives from the 14th district
- In office January 13, 2009 – May 27, 2015
- Preceded by: Park Strader
- Succeeded by: Jason Zachary

Personal details
- Born: May 8, 1985 (age 41) U.S.
- Party: Republican
- Education: University of Tennessee at Knoxville Member of the Pi Kappa Alpha fraternity
- Occupation: Insurance, and Politician
- Website: State Page

Ryan Adam Haynes (born May 8, 1985) is an American politician from Tennessee. In April, 2015 he became chairman of the Tennessee Republican Party, and resigned his Tennessee House District 14 seat on May 27, 2015.

After former TNGA Representative Haynes resigned his state office on May 27, 2015 to serve as the Chairman of the Tennessee Republican Party, Knoxville, Tennessee salesman Jason Zachary was appointed as representative by the Knox County Commission on August 12, 2015 to fill the District 14 House seat formerly held by Haynes.

== Committees ==
Rep. Haynes was a member of the following committees during his service in the legislature.

- House Education Committee
- House State & Local Government Committee
- House Finance Committee
