= Robert L. Reymond =

American Christian theologian (1932–2013)

Robert Lewis Reymond (October 30, 1932 – September 20, 2013) was an American Christian theologian of the Protestant Reformed tradition and the author of New Systematic Theology of the Christian Faith (1998; 2nd edition, 2002). Reymond held B.A., M.A., and PhD degrees from Bob Jones University, was ordained into the Reformed Presbyterian Church, Evangelical Synod in 1967, and taught at Covenant Theological Seminary in St. Louis, Missouri (1968-1990) and Knox Theological Seminary in Fort Lauderdale, Florida (1990-2008). When teaching as an associate professor of theology and apologetics at Covenant Theological Seminary, Reymond wrote The Justification of Knowledge: An Introductory Study in Christian Apologetic Methodology (1976; Presbyterian and Reformed Publishing Company). While at Covenant, Reymond also served in a pastoral role, pastoring an RPCES congregation in Hazelwood, MO between 1968 and 1973 and serving as interim pastor at another RPCES congregation in Waterloo, IL, between 1981 and 1985. In 1983, Reymond became affiliated with the Presbyterian Church in America, as a result of the RPCES's merger with the PCA.. After resigning from Knox in January 2008, he accepted a call as regular pulpit supply of Holy Trinity Presbyterian Church, a Ft. Lauderdale congregation in the Orthodox Presbyterian Church.

Reymond wrote a book on Paul entitled Paul Missionary Theologian (2003) and another about Jesus called Jesus Divine Messiah (2003). Other books include a short biography of John Calvin (2004), Contending for the Faith: Lines in the Sand That Strengthen the Church (2005), The God-Centered Preacher, The Reformation's Conflict with Rome: Why It Must Continue, What is God, and The Lamb of God. Reymond wrote A New Systematic Theology of the Christian Faith as a culmination of his years as a professor and pastor.
