= Park M. Strader =

American politician (1945–2009)

Member of the Tennessee House of Representatives from the 14th district
- In office January 11, 2005 – January 13, 2009
- Preceded by: H. E. Bittle
- Succeeded by: Ryan A. Haynes

Personal details
- Born: February 15, 1945 Knoxville, Tennessee, U.S.
- Died: August 19, 2009 (aged 64)
- Party: Republican
- Spouse: Married
- Children: 2
- Website: House website

Park M. Strader (February 15, 1945 – August 19, 2009) was an American politician and a member of the Tennessee House of Representatives for the 14th district, which comprises part of Knox County.

He was elected to the 104th General Assembly as a member of the Republican Party in 2004. He was a member of the House Commerce Committee, the House State and Local Committee, the House Local Government Subcommittee, and the House Utilities and Banking Subcommittee. For seven terms, Park Strader served as Knox County Assessor, from 1972 to 2000. From 2000 until his death, he worked as Chief Deputy Assessor.

Strader sponsored a House bill that would allow physicians to restrict other doctors from competing with their practices within either a ten mile radius or an entire county, depending on which encompasses a greater area. In 2005, Strader voted with the majority of the House to pass a bill that would raise the amount of funding for the state's pre-kindergarten pilot program from $10 million to $35 million.

Randy Button, chairman of the Tennessee Democratic Party, accused Strader and other politicians of accepting large contributions from the Gregory family, of King Pharmaceuticals and the PACs these interests supported. Button claimed that the contributions affected the decisions of Strader and other Tennessee legislators to not vote with the Republican Party against limiting donations from PACs and political parties.
