= D. James Kennedy =

American pastor, televangelist, and writer (1930–2007)

- Born: Dennis James Kennedy; November 3, 1930; Augusta, Georgia, U.S.
- Died: September 5, 2007 (aged 76); Fort Lauderdale, Florida, U.S.
- Education: University of Tampa (BA); Columbia Theological Seminary (MDiv); Chicago Graduate School of Theology (ThM); New York University (PhD)
- Spouse: Anne Lewis (1956–2007)
- Children: 1

Ecclesiastical career
- Church: Presbyterian Church in America
- Congregations: Coral Ridge Presbyterian Church

Dennis James Kennedy (November 3, 1930 – September 5, 2007) was an American Presbyterian pastor, evangelist, Christian broadcaster, and author. He was the senior pastor of Coral Ridge Presbyterian Church in Fort Lauderdale, Florida, from 1960 until his death in 2007. Kennedy also founded Evangelism Explosion International, Coral Ridge Ministries (now known as D. James Kennedy Ministries), the Westminster Academy in Fort Lauderdale, the Knox Theological Seminary, radio station WAFG-FM, and the Center for Reclaiming America for Christ, a socially conservative political group.

In 1974, he began Coral Ridge Ministries, which produced his weekly religious television program, The Coral Ridge Hour, carried on various networks and syndicated on numerous other stations with a peak audience of three million viewers in 200 countries. He also had a daily radio program, Truths That Transform, from 1984 on. During his lifetime, Coral Ridge Ministries grew to a US$37-million-a-year non-profit corporation.

In 2005, the National Religious Broadcasters association inducted Kennedy into its Hall of Fame.

== Early life ==
Kennedy was born in Augusta, Georgia, and moved with his parents to Chicago, Illinois, during his childhood. His father was a glass salesman, and his parents were Methodists. Kennedy joined the Boy Scouts. He later moved with his family to Tampa, Florida, where in 1948 he graduated from Henry B. Plant High School and began studying music at the University of Tampa. After two years, he dropped out of college, began working as a dance instructor at the Arthur Murray Dance Studio in Tampa, and later won a first prize in a nationwide dance contest. On August 25, 1956, he married Anne Lewis, whom he had met while giving her dance lessons at Arthur Murray. They had one daughter, Jennifer, born in 1962.

== Education ==
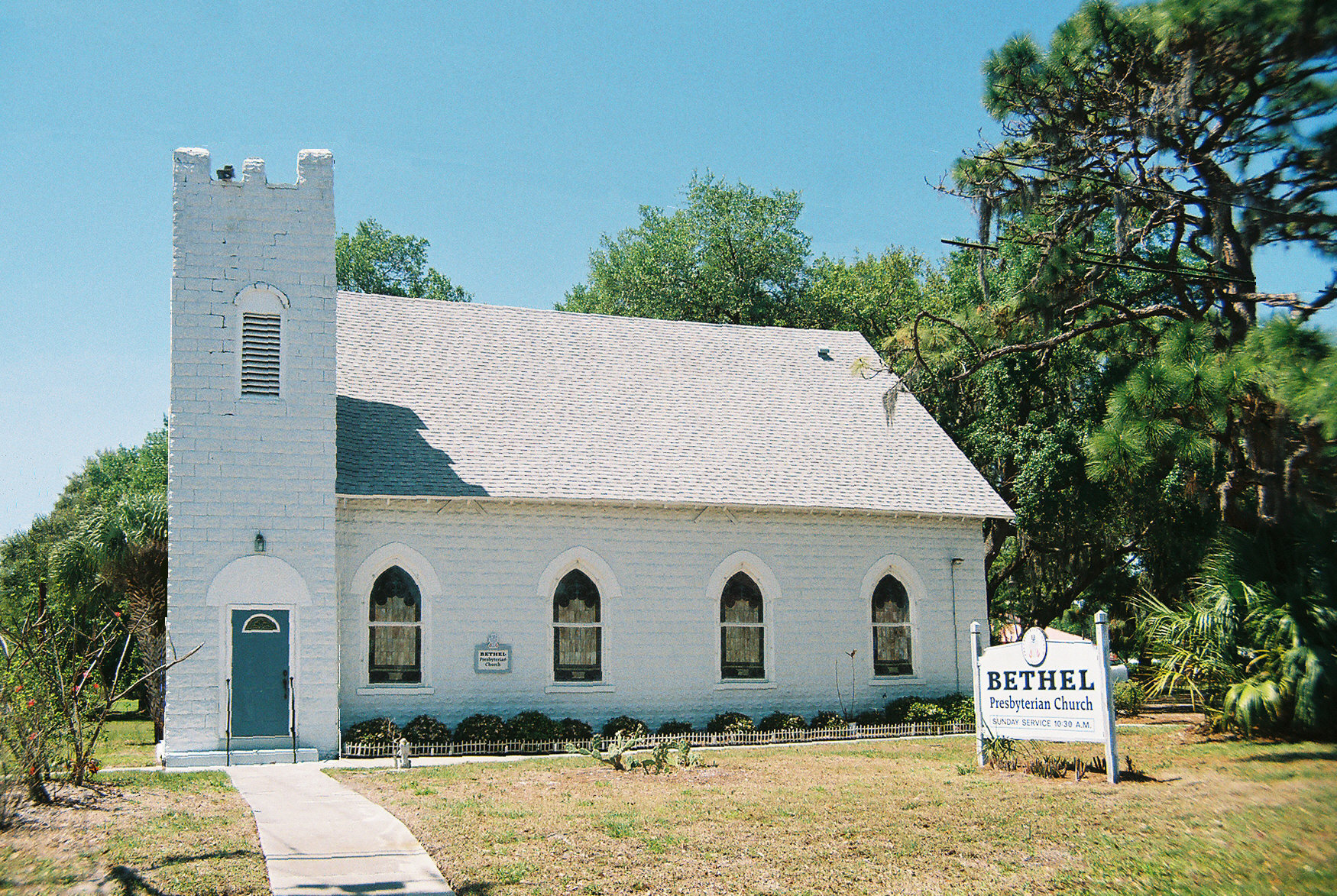
Bethel Presbyterian Church, where Kennedy began preaching in 1956

Kennedy became a Christian in 1953 after hearing a radio preacher present the Gospel, which Kennedy later said he had never heard up to that point. In December 1955, Kennedy decided to quit his Arthur Murray job to enter the ministry. He resumed his studies at the University of Tampa (graduating with a Bachelor of Arts in 1958) and began preaching at the small Bethel Presbyterian Church in nearby Clearwater, Florida. Kennedy entered Columbia Theological Seminary in 1956, receiving a Master of Divinity degree three years later. After his ordination in 1959, Kennedy became the pastor of Coral Ridge Presbyterian Church, where he remained until his death. In the 1970s, he earned a Master of Theology summa cum laude from the Chicago Graduate School of Theology, and in 1979 a doctorate in religious education from New York University. His doctoral dissertation was on the history of an evangelism program he founded. Kennedy said that he earned the Ph.D. degree "to dispel the idea there is an inconsistency between evangelism and education ... evangelical ministers [need] to be thoroughly educated and equipped to meet on equal terms anyone with whom they come in contact".

== Ministry and theology ==
Initially ordained in 1959 by the Presbyterian Church in the United States, Kennedy later became an ordained minister in the Presbyterian Church in America after he and his church left the PCUS in 1978. Adhering to traditional Calvinist theology, Kennedy's theological works include Why I Believe, What If Jesus Had Never Been Born, Skeptics Answered, and Truths That Transform. In 1971, he founded the Westminster Academy in Fort Lauderdale and in 1989, he founded Knox Theological Seminary.

Kennedy was a conservative evangelical minister and an outspoken advocate for the moral and social values championed by the Christian right. He wrote, with Jerry Newcombe, What if America Were a Christian Nation Again? and frequently preached messages that argued that the United States was founded as a Christian nation. Kennedy started the Center for Christian Statesmanship, an evangelical ministry on Capitol Hill in Washington, D.C. The Center closed in 2007 by Coral Ridge Ministries but quickly reopened under the auspices of Evangelism Explosion International, as the non-partisan Christian outreach to members of the United States Congress. In 2005, the National Religious Broadcasters association inducted Kennedy into its Hall of Fame.

== Founding of Coral Ridge Presbyterian Church ==
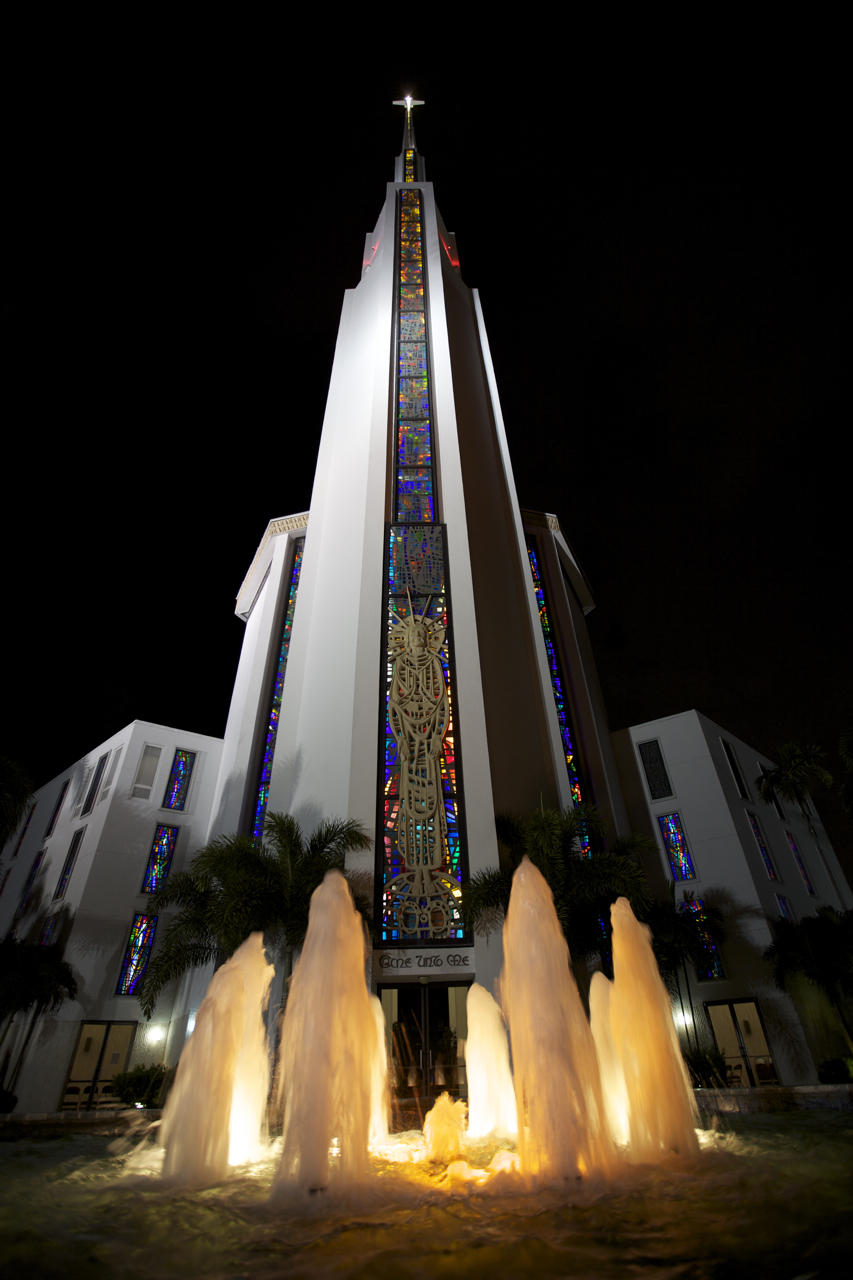
Coral Ridge Presbyterian Church, Fort Lauderdale, Florida

Kennedy preached his first sermon at the Coral Ridge Presbyterian Church in Fort Lauderdale in June 1959. Beginning with 45 persons attending a typical Sunday service, it became the fastest-growing Presbyterian church in the U.S. in the 1960s and had 1,366 members by 1968. Evangelist Billy Graham spoke at the dedication of the new Coral Ridge Presbyterian church building in 1974, attended by 15,000 people. Kennedy expressed his entrepreneurial vision for outreach at the dedication, stating,

It is our prayer, that through this church, the Gospel of Jesus Christ might be radiated through television and radio, motion pictures and cassettes, books and clinics, and by ways yet undreamed of unto the entire world, that the command of Christ to go and proclaim the Gospel to every creature might be fulfilled in our generation.

Kennedy developed the Evangelism Explosion ("EE") method of evangelism in the 1960s, which emphasizes the training of church laypeople to share their faith by home visitation and every-day encounters in the community. A film, Like a Mighty Army, was produced in 1970 and starred actor Chris Robinson as Kennedy, portraying the Evangelism Explosion story at Coral Ridge Presbyterian Church.

In 1978, Kennedy began the weekly Coral Ridge Hour (now Truths That Transform) on national television, which at its peak had a weekly audience of three million viewers in 200 countries and was aired on more than 400 stations and four cable networks, including the Trinity Broadcasting Network, The Inspiration Network (INSP) and the NRB Network, as well as broadcast to more than 150 countries on the Armed Forces Network. Today, D. James Kennedy Ministries carries messages from Kennedy, along with news commentary and documentaries to a nationwide audience on NRBTV, Daystar, TCT, and FETV. By the 1980s, the church's membership had grown to almost 10,000 persons. As of 2009, at the time of the installation of its new pastor, the church had 2,200 members and weekly attendance averaged 1,800 persons.

== Later life ==
On the evening of December 28, 2006, Kennedy experienced prolonged ventricular tachycardia at his Fort Lauderdale home, leading to cardiac arrest which deprived his brain of adequate oxygen for six to eight minutes. As a result, he sustained a loss of short-term memory and speech impairment. Despite several months of rehabilitation and convalescence, he was unable to resume preaching and his retirement was announced on August 26, 2007, at the Coral Ridge Presbyterian Church by his daughter, Jennifer Kennedy Cassidy. Following the news of Kennedy's retirement, his church announced the development of the D. James Kennedy Legacy website in tribute to the life of the Christian evangelist.

Kennedy died in his sleep at home in the early morning hours of September 5, 2007, aged 76. The White House issued a statement the following day, saying that President George W. Bush and First Lady Laura Bush were "deeply saddened" by Kennedy's death, calling him "a man of great vision, faith, and integrity ... Dr. Kennedy's message of love and hope inspired millions through the institutions he founded". Focus on the Family founder James Dobson called Kennedy "a passionate defender of biblical truth in a culture that increasingly forgot it" and "a giant in the battle to restore traditional values in our nation".

Shortly after Kennedy's heart attack, Coral Ridge Ministries reduced The Coral Ridge Hour syndication and shortened the program from an hour to 30 minutes. Kennedy's daughter, Jennifer, stated on the program in February 2008 that viewers' donations to the broadcast ministry had declined significantly in the wake of the founding pastor's death. (The show continues to air as Truths that Transform.) Coral Ridge Ministries closed its social action branch, The Center for Reclaiming America for Christ, shortly after Kennedy's heart attack.

In 2018, D. James Kennedy Ministries launched the D. James Kennedy Center for Christian Leadership in Washington, D.C., "to address the deficit of preparation for Biblical cultural engagement". It seeks to train 300 Leadership Fellows annually for the ensuing decade.

The D. James Kennedy Institute of Reformed Leadership was established in 2013. Kennedy's daughter, Jennifer Kennedy Cassidy, introduced Michael A. Milton as president of the legacy institute in proceedings at the Ronald Reagan Presidential Center and Ranch, Rancho del Cielo, in Santa Barbara, California.

== Apologetics ==
In Christian apologetics, Kennedy contended for Christianity as a reasonable and evidential faith (one supported by facts from history and science), and wrote several books (Why I Believe, Skeptics Answered, and Solving Bible Mysteries) to make the case for Christian faith from history, science, and logic. "Skeptics are welcome," he wrote in his book, Skeptics Answered: "Christianity has answers that are not only satisfying for the soul but also satisfying for the mind ... Throughout the ages, many skeptics have looked at Christianity's historicity and have ended up coming to faith in Christ. The evidence is there. It just needs to be looked at with an open mind." Kennedy also offered a "cultural apologetic" and argued for the earthly benefits brought by the influence of Christ and the Bible. His books with Jerry Newcombe, What If Jesus Had Never Been Born (1994, revised 2001) and What If the Bible Had Never Been Written (1998), seek to document the positive impact of Christianity and the Bible in education, law, civil liberty, science, economics, the family, medicine, and the arts.

Kennedy produced Who Is This Jesus?, a one-hour television special that aired on CBS affiliates on Christmas of 2001. The program, co-hosted by Kennedy with actor Dean Jones, reached a claimed 20 million viewers, with its Easter follow-up, Who Is This Jesus: Is He Risen? The program offered scholarly viewpoints on the reliability of the Gospels, especially the resurrection claim. Associated Press religion writer Richard Ostling contrasted the broadcast to the 2000 Peter Jennings-hosted ABC News documentary, The Search for Jesus, contending the program "achieved more journalistic success than Jennings at one point" by providing a broader cross-section of experts.

== Views ==
=== Religion in public life ===
Many of his public messages focused on American history and the faith of the Founding Fathers of the United States in relation to a Christian worldview. For instance, Kennedy cited John Quincy Adams' claim that Christianity is "indissolubly linked" to the founding of America. Kennedy wrote the foreword to the 1987 book Christianity and the Constitution: The Faith of Our Founding Fathers authored by law professor John Eidsmoe.

== Conservative Christian leader ==
Kennedy was a founding member of the board of Moral Majority, a political movement in the late 1970s and 1980s. When GOP presidential candidates, including Ronald Reagan, sought the blessing of evangelical leaders, Kennedy sometimes asked spiritual, not policy questions. In one meeting, Kennedy asked Reagan what reason he would give as to why God should let him into heaven. According to one observer, "Reagan dropped his eyes, looked at his feet, and said, 'I wouldn't give God any reason for letting me in. I'd just ask for mercy, because of what Jesus Christ did for me at Calvary.'"

Kennedy later celebrated Reagan's election at a gathering of Christian leaders just days after Reagan's inauguration in 1981. "The sleeping giant that has lain prostrate across America is beginning to wake itself," Kennedy told the National Religious Broadcasters association in Washington, D.C. "Believers in a living God are beginning to assert their spiritual rights."

At the same time, he cautioned his own congregation about the limits of politics in a sermon titled, "Can Reagan Save America?" Reagan was likely to bring positive good to the nation, Kennedy said, but Christians should put their trust in God, not man. "[M]any people feel that a man on a white horse has arrived and is going to take care of us," Kennedy preached. "This, according to the Scriptures, is a very dangerous attitude."

Kennedy, in opposition to same-sex marriage, presented a two-part strategy to counter legislative and court initiatives to "redefine marriage". He called for a constitutional "Firewall" to protect the nation from "counterfeit marriage" and urged "conversion for homosexuals who want to change, through the power of Jesus Christ". Kennedy rejected judicial activism and judicial supremacy. He endorsed the Constitution Restoration Act, a bill promoted during the 2005 Confronting the Judicial War on Faith conference that sought to authorize Congress to impeach judges who fail to acknowledge "God as the sovereign source of law, liberty, or government" and to limit the power of the federal judiciary to rule in religious liberty cases. Kennedy was a co-signer of the "Land Letter" sent to President George W. Bush in October 2002 which outlined a "just war" rationale for the military invasion of Iraq. Kennedy sought to "reclaim America for Christ", a project that he said was to "bring this nation back to God, back to decency, back to morality, back to those things that we wish America was like again".

During his life, he was harshly criticized by secularists and progressives. The Americans United for the Separation of Church and State (AUSCS, "Americans United" or simply AU) criticized Kennedy's founding of the Center for Reclaiming America for Christ for being "just another Religious Right outfit obsessed with opposing legal abortion and gay rights and bashing public education". AUSCS also says, "Kennedy's ministry has always promoted right-wing politics ... it isn't uncommon to tune in to The Coral Ridge Hour and hear him preach against legal abortion, anti-discrimination protections for gays or the teaching of evolution in public schools." Then-AUSCS executive director Barry Lynn said of Kennedy: "He was absolutely relentless in his criticism of everything on the left. He was a formidable creator of an opposition to what people like I believe."

In an interview with NPR's Terry Gross, Kennedy was asked whether he wanted all public office holders to be Christians. Kennedy answered, "We have people who are secular and humanist and unbelievers who are constantly supporting in every way possible other people who share those views. And I don't object to that. That's their privilege. And I think that Christians should be allowed the same privilege to vote for people whom they believe share their views about life and government. And that's all I'm talking about."

== Creationist ==
In creation–evolution debates, Kennedy was a proponent of the general tenets of a special creation by God and the supernatural presumptions of young earth creationists and proponents of intelligent design. He argued that the expression and promotion of such beliefs should be protected as free speech. He believed scientific truth is not determined by consensus but evidence and so, contrary to scientific consensus, he asserted creationist beliefs were scientifically accurate.

Kennedy disputed the facts and theory of evolution by saying, "The two most notorious and blood-soaked political movements of the twentieth century, Nazism and Communism, both rejected God and were animated by the idea of evolution." According to Kennedy, "if one believes that evolution is true, then we are simply the product of time and chance and there is no morality and no intrinsic worth to human life." That theme is reflected in Coral Ridge Ministries' 2006 documentary Darwin's Deadly Legacy. The Anti-Defamation League (ADL) issued a press release in 2006 strongly criticizing the movie's attempts to link evolution to Adolf Hitler:

This is an outrageous and shoddy attempt by D. James Kennedy to trivialize the horrors of the Holocaust. Hitler did not need Darwin to devise his heinous plan to exterminate the Jewish people. Trivializing the Holocaust comes from either ignorance at best or, at worst, a mendacious attempt to score political points in the culture war on the backs of six million Jewish victims and others who died at the hands of the Nazis.

The ADL further denounced Kennedy as "a leader among the distinct group of 'Christian Supremacists' who seek to 'reclaim America for Christ' and turn the U.S. into a Christian nation guided by their strange notions of biblical law". The ADL's response also quotes Christian geneticist Francis Collins, who was interviewed for the program, repudiating it, saying he was "absolutely appalled by what Coral Ridge Ministries is doing. I had NO knowledge that Coral Ridge Ministries was planning a TV special on Darwin and Hitler, and I find the thesis of Dr. Kennedy's program utterly misguided and inflammatory". In a release, Coral Ridge Ministries rejected the statement attributed to Francis Collins that he was misled:

A producer told Dr. Collins in person before the interview began that he was being interviewed for a program that would address the adverse social consequences of Darwin. In addition, he was asked specifically, during the interview, about the Darwin-Hitler connection and responded on tape that he did not agree with that view.

According to the Coral Ridge press release, Collins had signed a "talent release", giving "Coral Ridge Ministries the right to use his interview 'without limitation in all perpetuity.'" The Ministry said they would delete his interview for all future airings of the program.

Coral Ridge Ministries answered other parts of the ADL's criticisms in an August 22, 2006 press release, stating that the ADL "ignores the historical fact that Adolf Hitler was an evolutionist". The release cited historian Richard Weikart, Scottish anatomist and anthropologist Sir Arthur Keith, and evolutionist Niles Eldredge for the assertion of a Darwin-Hitler connection.

== Books ==
Kennedy wrote 65 books, including Evangelism Explosion (a primer on communicating the Christian salvation message with 1.5 million copies in print), What If Jesus Had Never Been Born?, The Da Vinci Myth versus The Gospel Truth, and Cross Purposes: Discovering the Great Love of God for You.

Kennedy is the author or coauthor of the following books:

- Kennedy, D. James; Newcombe, Jerry (2007). Cross Purposes: Discovering the Great Love of God for You. Multnomah. ISBN 978-1593283049.
- Kennedy, D. James (1993). Delighting God: How to Live at the Center of God's Will. Vine Books. ISBN 9780892838318.
- Kennedy, D. James (1996). Evangelism Explosion. Tyndale. ISBN 0842307648.
- Kennedy, D. James (2001). God's absolute best for you: Unlocking your God-given potential by following his ten commands. Coral Ridge Ministries.
- Kennedy, D. James (1995). How Do I Get to Know God?. Fleming H. Revell Co. ISBN 9780800755577.
- Kennedy, D. James (1995). How Do I Live for God?. Fleming H. Revell Co. ISBN 9780800755591.
- Kennedy, D. James (1999). Led by the Carpenter: Finding God's Purpose for Your Life. Thomas Nelson. ISBN 9780785270393.
- Kennedy, D. James; Newcombe, Jerry (2005). Lord of All: Developing a Christian World-and-Life View. Crossway. ISBN 9781581346770.
- Kennedy, D. James (1996). New Every Morning: A Daily Devotional. Multnomah. ISBN 9781576730683.
- Kennedy, D. James (1997). The Secret to a Happy Home. Whitaker House. ISBN 9780883683354.
- Kennedy, D. James (2005). Skeptics Answered. Multnomah. ISBN 9781590526590.
- Kennedy, D. James (2000). Solving Bible Mysteries: Unraveling the Perplexing and Troubling Passages of Scripture. Thomas Nelson. ISBN 9780785270416.
- Kennedy, D. James; Newcombe, Jerry (1997). The Gates Of Hell Shall Not Prevail: The Attack on Christianity and What You Need To Know To Combat It. Thomas Nelson. ISBN 9780785271772.
- Kennedy, D. James (1996). Truths That Transform: Christian Doctrines for Your Life Today. Fleming H. Revell Co. ISBN 9780800756093.
- Kennedy, D. James (1991). Turn It to Gold. Vine Books. ISBN 9780892836505.
- Kennedy, D. James; Newcombe, Jerry (2005). What If America Were a Christian Nation Again?. Thomas Nelson. ISBN 9780785269724.
- Kennedy, D. James; Newcombe, Jerry (1994). What If Jesus Had Never Been Born?. Thomas Nelson. ISBN 9780849920790.
- Kennedy, D. James; Newcombe, Jerry (1998). What If the Bible Had Never Been Written?. Thomas Nelson. ISBN 9780785271543.
- Kennedy, D. James (1995). What Is God Like?. Fleming H. Revell Co. ISBN 978-0800755584.
- Kennedy, D. James; Newcombe; Jerry (2004). What's Wrong with Same Sex Marriage?. Crossway. ISBN 9781581346633.
- Kennedy, D. James; Newcombe, Jerry (2002). Who is This Jesus? Is He Risen?. Coral Ridge Ministries. ISBN 9781929626380.
- Kennedy, D. James (2005). Why I Believe, rev. ed. Thomas Nelson. ISBN 9780849901539.
- Kennedy, D. James; Newcombe, Jerry (2006). The Da Vinci Myth Versus the Gospel Truth. Crossway. ISBN 9781581348255.
- Kennedy, D. James (2005). Save a marriage Save our nation: A guide to domestic Tranquility. Coral Ridge Ministries. ISBN 9781929626182.
- Kennedy, D. James (2005). Why the Ten Commandments Matter. FaithWords. ISBN 9780446577274.
- Kennedy, D. James; Newcombe, Jerry (2008). The Presence of a Hidden God: Evidence for the God of the Bible. Multnomah. ISBN 9781601420770.
- Kennedy, D. James; Newcombe, Jerry (2008). The Real Messiah: Prophecies Fulfilled. D. James Kennedy Foundation. ISBN 9780615227283.
- Kennedy, D. James (1987). Learning to Live With the People You Love. Whitaker House. ISBN 9780883681909.
- Kennedy, D. James (1985). Knowing the Whole Truth: Basic Christianity and What It Means in Your Life. Fleming H. Revell Co. ISBN 0800714075.
- Kennedy, D. James; Newcombe, Jerry (2008). How Would Jesus Vote?: A Christian Perspective on the Issues. WaterBrook Press. ISBN 9781400074068.
- Kennedy, D. James (2001). Why Was America Attacked?: Answers for a Nation at War. Broadman & Holman. ISBN 9780805425789.
- Kennedy, D. James (1988). Your Prodigal Child. Thomas Nelson. ISBN 9780840776198.
- Kennedy, D. James; Sorensen, John B. (2010). Well Done. Greentree Press. ISBN 9780982872109.
- Kennedy, D. James; Black, Jim Nelson (1994). Character & Destiny: A Nation in Search of Its Soul. Thomas Nelson. ISBN 9780310443803.
