= Knox Theological Seminary =

Evangelical theological seminary

Coordinates: 26°11′44″N 80°6′48″W

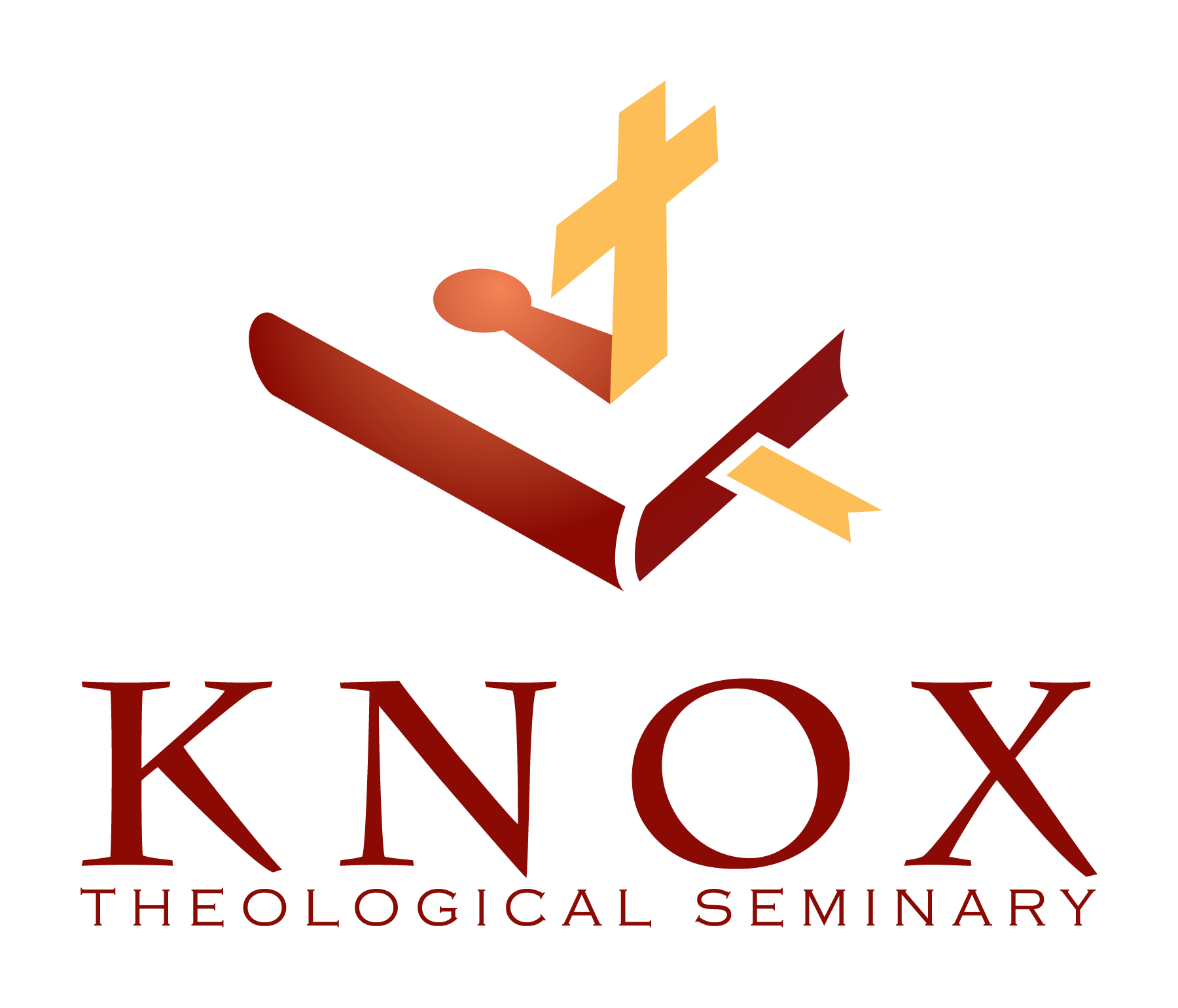
- Type: Evangelical Seminary
- Established: 1989
- Founders: D. James Kennedy, Coral Ridge Presbyterian Church
- Accreditation: Association of Theological Schools
- Chairman: Peter Bartuska
- President: Scott Manor
- Provost: Timothy Sansbury
- Students: 200
- Location: Fort Lauderdale, Florida, USA
- Campus: Urban
- Website: https://knoxseminary.edu

Knox Theological Seminary is an independent, reformed evangelical seminary in Fort Lauderdale, Florida, US, founded in 1989 by D. James Kennedy. The school provides ministry training as a fully online seminary.

== History ==
Named after the Scottish reformer John Knox, Knox Theological Seminary was founded in 1989 by D. James Kennedy (1930–2007), Senior pastor of Coral Ridge Presbyterian Church. Kennedy wanted to build an institution that would teach and equip men and women to become pastors, teachers, evangelists, and lay workers who would fulfill the Great Commission and impact all aspects of culture. The goal, he said, was to train ministers who would "stand for truth without compromise and have a zeal for evangelism." At that time, the seminary was a subsidiary of Coral Ridge Presbyterian Church.

The seminary became an independent free-standing institution under the governance of its board of directors on July 1, 2013.

== Academics ==
In 2023, Knox had 20 full-time, adjunct, and visiting instructors. Scott Manor is President of the seminary as well as Professor of Historical Theology. Gerald Bray, Bryan Chapell, Robert L. Reymond and Bruce Waltke have lectured there in the past.

Knox currently offers three Masters courses and one Doctorate, as well as several certificate programs.

== Governance ==
Knox is governed by a board of directors. Knox Seminary's board installed Samuel Lamerson as president in November 2014. Lamerson was professor of New Testament before becoming president.

The seminary continues to have a close relationship with Coral Ridge Presbyterian Church, including 25% board membership.

== Accreditation ==
The school graduated its first class in 1993 and was granted accreditation by the Association of Theological Schools in 2005. Knox obtained ATS approval in 2012 to offer two master's degree programs (Biblical and Theological Studies, Christianity and Culture) entirely online.

The seminary is part of the AAAS joint programme with the ATS, Science for Seminaries.
