= Greenville Presbyterian Theological Seminary =

Christian Reformed higher education institution

- Type: Seminary
- Established: 1986
- Accreditation: Association of Reformed Theological Seminaries
- President: Jonathan Master
- Location: Greenville, South Carolina, United States; 34°55′13.5″N 82°17′38.8″W
- Website: www.gpts.edu

Greenville Presbyterian Theological Seminary is a confessional Presbyterian seminary in Greenville, South Carolina, United States. It was founded in 1986 and is not affiliated with a specific Christian denomination. The president of the seminary is Jonathan Master, formerly the Dean of the School of Divinity at Cairn University.

== Westminster Seminary ==
Westminster Seminary UK, formally known as "Westminster Presbyterian Theological Seminary", is a theologically conservative Presbyterian school of theology based in Newcastle upon Tyne, England, and offers a range of courses accredited through Greenville Presbyterian Theological Seminary, including the Master of Divinity (M.Div.). It has a particular focus on preparing its students for planting churches in the UK and continental Europe. The seminary is a member of Affinity, a network of conservative evangelical organizations in the British Isles.

The seminary was found in September 2013 by two ministers of the Evangelical Presbyterian Church in England and Wales: Ian Hamilton, minister of Cambridge Presbyterian Church and Bill Schweitzer, minister of Gateshead Presbyterian Church, as well as Joseph Pipa, president of Greenville Presbyterian Theological Seminary. Westminster's first graduate completed his studies three years later.

The seminary gained Charitable Incorporated Organisation status in 2020. At the start of 2025, Donald John MacLean, a professor of Historical Theology, succeeded the Rev Dr Ian Hamilton as President of Westminster Seminary. In 2025, Westminster Seminary announced that it plans to relocate from Newcastle-upon-Tyne to Oxford in August 2026.

== Degrees offered ==
- Divinity Program with a Bachelor and Master of Divinity
- Master of Ministry for Ruling Elders and Deacons
- Master of Arts (with specializations in the areas of Biblical Languages, and church history, systematic theology)
- Master of Theology
- Doctor of Theology (with specializations in the areas of biblical languages, church history, systematic theology)

The school is a charter member of the Association of Reformed Theological Seminaries.

Those offered in the UK include:

- Master of Divinity (MDiv)
- Bachelor of Divinity (BDiv)
- Master of Theology (ThM)
- Master of Arts in religion (MAR)
- Diploma in Biblical Studies (DipBS)
- School of Theology (CertBS)
