= First Presbyterian Church (Columbia, South Carolina) =

Historic church in South Carolina, United States

- U.S. National Register of Historic Places
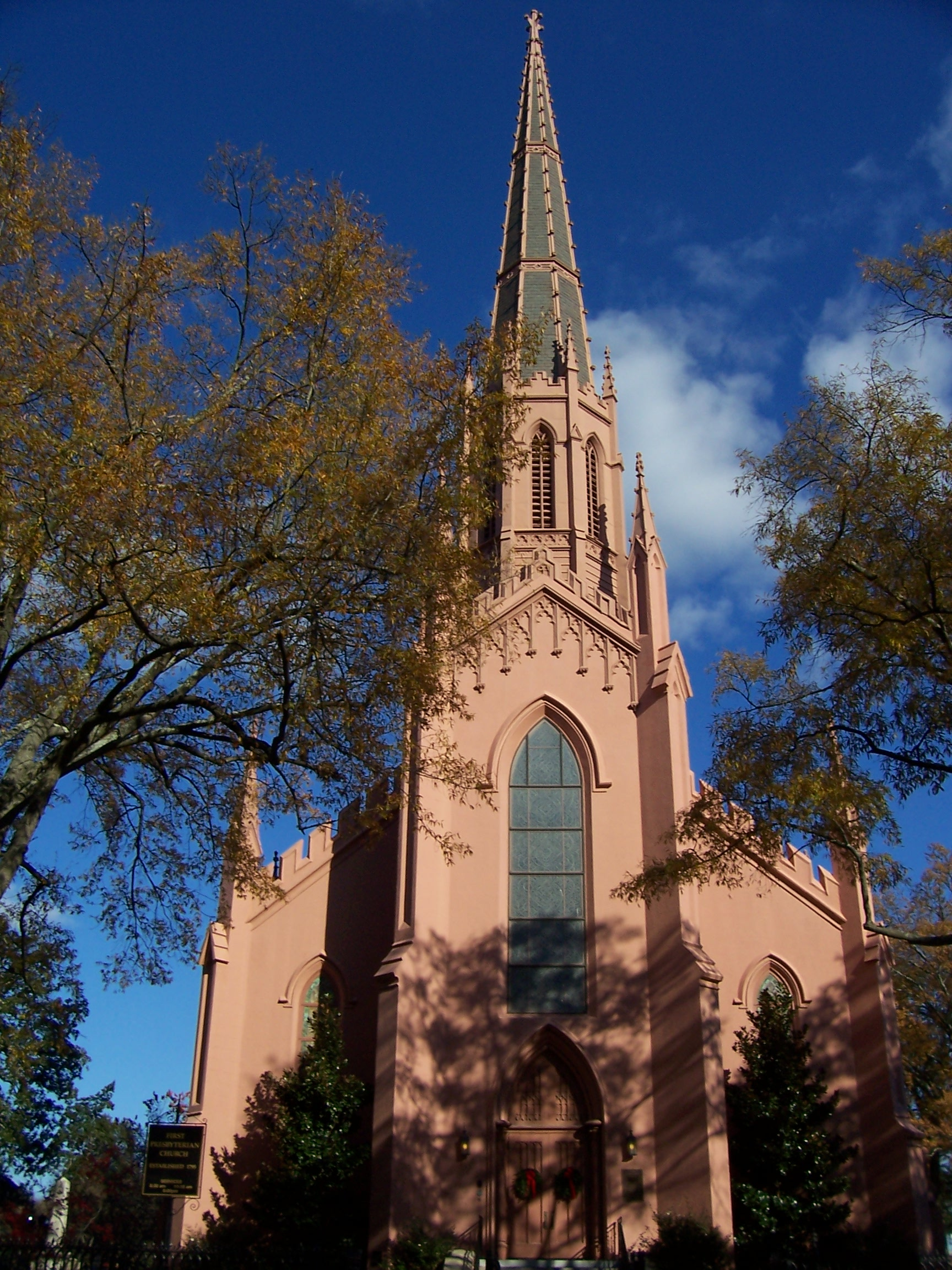
- The spire and front of First Presbyterian Church

- Location within South Carolina Location within the United States
- Location: 1324 Marion St, Columbia, South Carolina
- Coordinates: 34°0′13.7″N 81°1′51″W
- Area: 3 acres (1.2 ha)
- Built: 1853
- Architectural style: Gothic
- NRHP reference No.: 71000801
- Added to NRHP: January 25, 1971

The First Presbyterian Church is a historic church building in Columbia, South Carolina, United States. Constructed in 1854, it was added to the National Register of Historic Places on January 25, 1971.

== History ==
Although the first meetings of what would become the First Presbyterian Church were held in 1795, the congregation did not have a building of its own until 1813, having met in the South Carolina State House and on the campus of the South Carolina College until then. In 1813, the South Carolina Legislature incorporated the church as the "First Presbyterian Church of the Town of Columbia"

The current site of the church was a shared cemetery with the local Episcopal congregation from 1794 to 1813. The legislature gave the cemetery and other lands to be shared between the Episcopalians and the Presbyterians. A local legend says that First Presbyterian and the now-nearby Trinity Episcopal Cathedral drew lots to determine which congregation would get what lot, with First Presbyterian receiving the cemetery, located at the corner of Lady and Marion Streets.

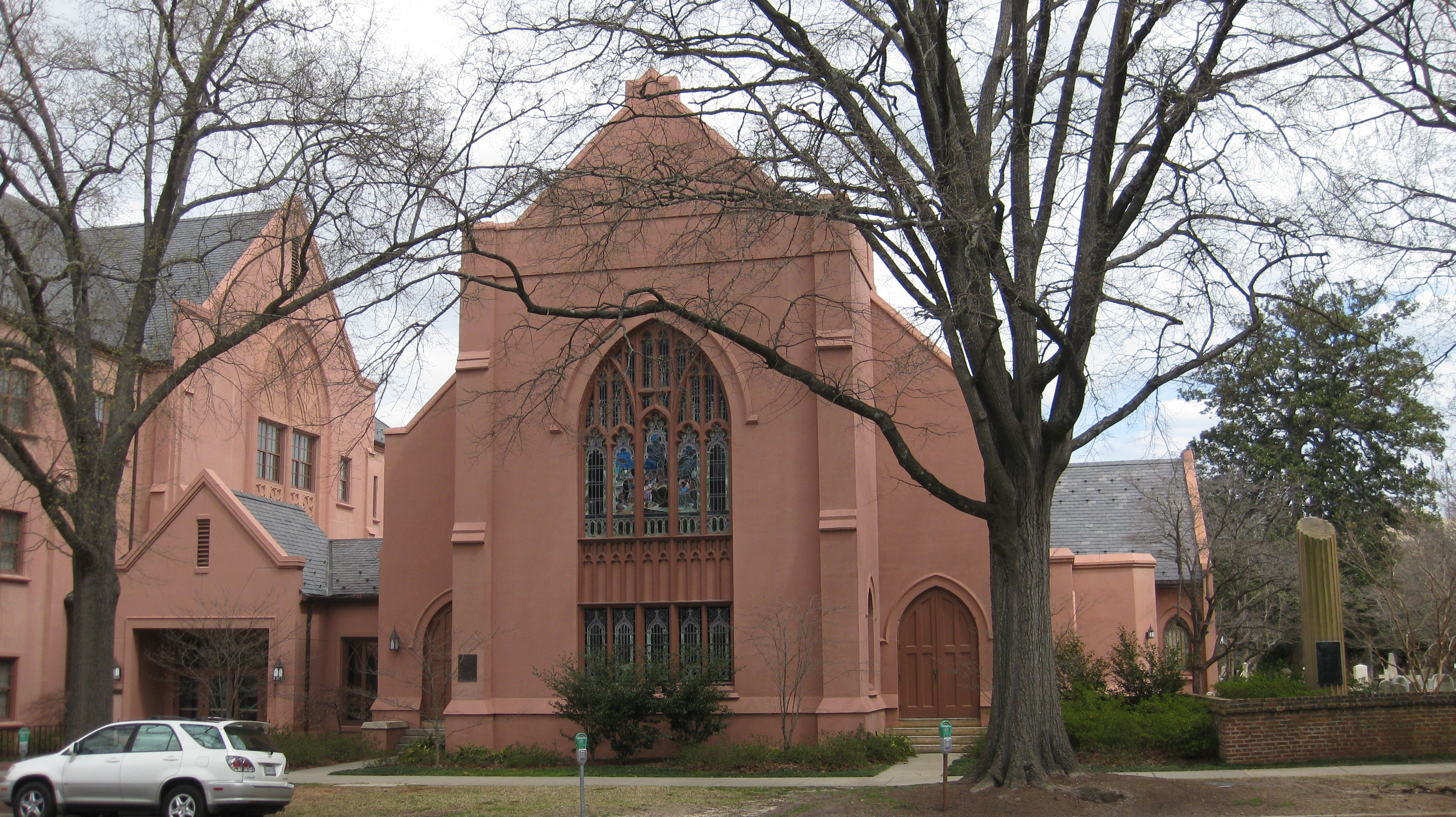
Jackson Hall, the first sanctuary, in March 2010

The 1813 building still exists, and is now known as Jackson Hall. A new, larger English Gothic structure was built in 1853. Though spared the torch during Sherman's march to the sea, the building's original 180-foot spire was destroyed in an 1875 hurricane, and rebuilt in 1888. The spire was again damaged in a 1910 fire, and rebuilt to be eight feet taller. A remodeling in 1925 increased the capacity of the building to 1,250 from 800, increasing the length of the building by 40 feet. At the same time, classrooms were built at the sides, a choir loft added in the rear, and the organ loft rebuilt. The architect of the remodeling project was R. H. Hunt of Chattanooga, Tennessee.

Formerly a member of the Presbyterian Church in the United States, it seceded in 1983 and joined the Associate Reformed Presbyterian Church. Former pastors include James Henley Thornwell, Benjamin Morgan Palmer, John Girardeau, Sinclair Ferguson, and Derek Thomas. The current senior minister is Dr. Neil Stewart.

There are quite a few notable people buried in the church's cemetery. Among them are Henry William de Saussure, second director of the United States Mint; Jonathan Maxcy, the first president of South Carolina College; and Martha Thomas Fitzgerald, the first woman elected in a general election to the South Carolina House of Representatives.
