= Stuart Robinson =

Stuart Robinson may refer to:

- Stuart Robinson (broadcaster)
- Stuart Robinson (bishop)
- Stuart Robinson (minister)

== See also ==
- Stuart Robinson School, a settlement school in Blackey, Letcher County, Kentucky, U.S.
