= Charles Spring =

Charles Spring may refer to:

- Charles A. Spring (1800–1892), American merchant and religious leader
- Charles A. Spring Jr. (1826–1901), Chicago capitalist
- Charlie Spring, a character from the graphic novel Heartstopper
