= Stuart Robinson (minister) =

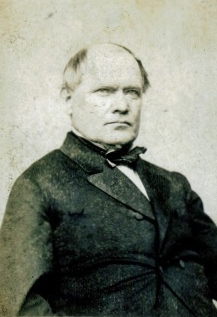
Stuart Robinson

Stuart Robinson (14 November 1814 – 5 October 1881) was an American Presbyterian minister.

Robinson was an Ulster Scot, born in Strabane, County Tyrone, Ireland. He emigrated with his family to Berkeley County, Virginia. He studied at Amherst College, Union Theological Seminary, and Princeton Theological Seminary and was ordained to the Presbyterian ministry in 1841. He pastored a number of churches before being appointed to the chair of church government and pastoral theology at Danville Theological Seminary in 1856. He taught there until 1858, when he became minister of Second Presbyterian Church in Louisville, Kentucky, a position he held until his death. He founded a weekly newspaper in April 1862 called True Presbyterian, in order to "directly oppose the Unionist political theology advocated by Robert J. Breckinridge and the Danville Quarterly Review". He was arrested for Confederate sentiments later that year and upon release fled to Canada, where he spent the remainder of the war.

Robinson returned to Louisville in 1866, and became leader of the portion of the Kentucky Synod which joined the Southern Presbyterian Church. He was elected moderator of that body in 1869.

Robinson wrote The Church of God as an Essential Element of the Gospel (1858) in which he championed the doctrine of the spirituality of the Church. He defended the institution of slavery in his 1865 book, Slavery As Recognized In The Mosaic Civil Law, Recognized Also, And Allowed, In The Abrahamic, Mosaic And Christian Church.

Stuart Robinson School in Blackey, Kentucky was named in his honor.
