= Charles A. Spring Jr. =

American businessman (1826–1901)

Charles A. Spring Jr. (1826–1901) was a prominent Chicago capitalist during its transition from a frontier town of 30,000 in the 1850s to an industrial metropolis of more than 1.7 million at the turn of the 20th century. He was a key figure in its rise, serving as inventor Cyrus McCormick's closest adviser and as general manager of the McCormick Harvesting Company for many years.

== Early life ==
Charles A. Spring Jr. was born in Boston in 1826, and spent his first years there and then in Brooklyn, New York. His father, Charles A. Spring Sr., was a dry goods merchant at the time, and his grandfather was Reverend Samuel Spring. In 1837, the family moved west and settled into farming at Rock Island, Illinois. After Charles Jr.'s mother died in 1850, the Springs went into the boot and shoe business in Chicago under the name C. A. Spring & Sons.

In November 1853, Charles Jr. married Ellen Maria Spring (possibly a relative) in East Hartford, Connecticut. The couple were married by Charles' uncle, Reverend Samuel Spring Jr., who was attached to a church there.

The following year, Ellen gave birth to Kittie Maria Spring, Charles' only child. Soon afterwards, in 1855, Charles went to work for the inventor Cyrus McCormick, a friend of his father's, in the McCormick Reaper factory in Chicago. Charles' father and siblings moved south to Manteno, Illinois and returned to farming by around 1858, but Charles Jr. stayed on in Chicago.

In 1861, his wife Ellen died at the age of 27, leaving Spring alone with a six-year-old daughter.

== McCormick Harvesting Company and Great Chicago Fire ==
Upon the death of William Sanderson McCormick (the brother of the inventor) in 1865, Spring replaced him as superintendent and general manager of McCormick & Co., and as the manager of Cyrus McCormick's extensive real estate holdings and other financial concerns. The following year (1866), he married Eugenia B. Keith, his first cousin on his mother's side.

Through the summer of 1871, Cyrus and his brother Leander McCormick, who had fought over the division of their brother's estate and a great many other things, were trying to renegotiate a partnership agreement. At one point that July, Spring became so frustrated over the conflict that he threatened to resign; at this, Cyrus wrote to Leander: “Can we do business without Spring?"

In September, the remaining brothers finally reached an accord, but it was all destroyed within a few weeks when (according to legend) Mrs. O'Leary's cow kicked over a lantern and set a barn ablaze. The Great Chicago Fire destroyed the entirety of the McCormick factory, along with most of Chicago. All of the office staff lost their homes, but most escaped with their lives. Spring along with wife Eugenia and teenage daughter Kittie, fled from the inferno to the shores of Lake Michigan, where they spent the night waist-deep in the water, dodging flaming pieces of debris. They passed the following two nights holed up in a nearby lighthouse.

Within a few days, Spring and the others had opened a temporary office across Ashland Avenue from the old Bull's Head Tavern, and McCormick made the decision to rebuild. Although he had warned McCormick about the spotty insurance that they carried (as recently as November of the previous year), Spring set into the task of rebuilding with all his might. His heavy responsibilities through this period undermined his health, however, and although McCormick raised his salary to $15,000 to get him to stay on, he retired in October 1873.

The resignation of the man William Hutchinson, McCormick's biographer, called “the experienced and conciliatory C. A. Spring” spelled the darkest days of the firm. By 1875, however, Spring was once again supervising McCormick's personal financial concerns, and he ultimately returned to work for the company in 1879.

== Later life ==
When Cyrus McCormick died in 1884, Spring was asked to serve as a pallbearer. Cyrus Jr. took over his father's business, and Spring likely retired after this. He was still quite active in various financial concerns in Chicago; as of 1891, for example, he sat on the Board of Directors of the North Chicago Street Railroad Company. On the 1900 Census, he listed his occupation only as “Capitalist.”

Spring died on July 16, 1901; his death was noted in national newspapers the following day. His obituary, in part, read:

It was one of his principles that no man should have more than what he considered a moderate fortune, and in keeping his property at the $250,000 mark. . . charitable institutions and individuals were benefitted. He gave away large sums, but in such a quiet manner that few persons were aware of them.

Spring's extensive correspondence to and from McCormick is held by the Wisconsin Historical Society.

== Relations ==
Charles's widow, Eugenia, continued to live at their home at 448 Dearborn Avenue after his death. She often donated art and other precious objects to local museums under the name “Mrs. Charles A. Spring, Jr.” She died in 1920.

Charles was the elder brother of Winthrop N. Spring, who died along with his wife and daughter in the Iroquois Theatre Fire in 1903. Charles' only child, Kittie, died in 1881; her son Charles Mellon Woodman became a Quaker minister, and son Harris Spring Woodman served with the Red Cross in Europe during World War I.
