= Gardiner Spring =

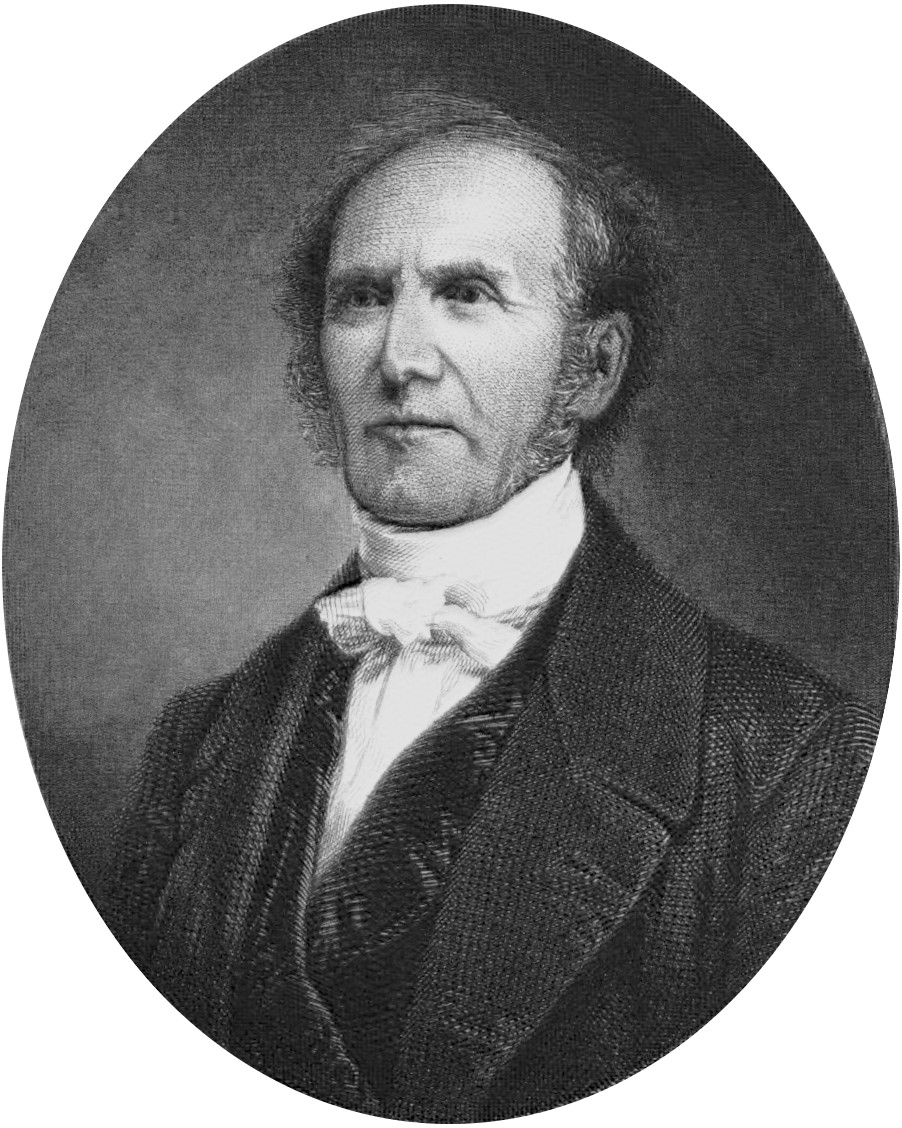
- Born: February 24, 1785; Newburyport, Massachusetts
- Died: August 18, 1873 (aged 88); Manhattan, New York
- Resting place: Cemetery of the Evergreens
- Occupations: Minister, author
- Known for: Gardiner Spring Resolutions
- Notable work: The Power of the Pulpit, Fragments from the Study of a Pastor
- Father: Samuel Spring
- Relatives: Charles A. Spring (brother)

Gardiner Spring (February 24, 1785 – August 18, 1873) was an American minister and author. He served as pastor of the Brick Presbyterian Church in New York City for 63 years.

== Life ==
Spring was born on February 24, 1785, in Newburyport, Massachusetts, the oldest child of the politically well-connected Reverend Samuel Spring. His parents directed him towards the ministry, which he initially resisted.

He attended grammar school in Newburyport, but he was also privately tutored by Chief Justice Parsons. At the age of 15, he entered Yale College, where he became the class-mate of John C. Calhoun. He delivered the valedictory address at the Commencement exercise in 1805. He did not then appear to incline toward the Church, and on leaving college pursued the studies of law in the office of Judge Daggett, in New Haven. The principal portion of his time, however, was occupied in teaching, and he established an English school in the Bermuda Islands, where he spent fifteen months. He was admitted to the Bar in 1808, and commenced practice under favorable auspices, but he subsequently abandoned the profession against the wishes of his wife, whom he married in 1803, and declared his intention of becoming a minister. This sudden change he himself attributed to the effect of a sermon preached by the Reverend John Mason, in New Haven, from the text, "To the poor the Gospel is preached". He described the impression the discourse produced as miraculous; he could not restrain from tears, and from that moment he followed the ministry with zeal and piety.

Spring spent one year at Andover Theological Seminary, and was ordained in 1809. After receiving calls from several New England parishes he preached in Cedar-street Church in the following spring, and in the same year, by unanimous call, was invited to the pastorate of the old Brick Church on Beekman street in New York City. Spring frequently received calls of higher trust and responsibility, including the presidencies of Dartmouth and Hamilton colleges, but he did not desire to abandon his first field of labor, and during the sixty-three years of his pastoral care of that church he was regarded as second to no preacher in this city. His congregation moved to Murray Hill in 1851, and in the following year he accepted as his associate Rev. William Greenough Thayer Shedd.

Spring was appointed to the Board of Princeton Theological Seminary in 1814. In 1848, he wrote a book called "The Power of the Pulpit," comparing the pastorally-trained ministers with those who had been trained in seminaries. The conclusion was that pastoral effectiveness was better when students spent time with the more mature ministers. Spring's beliefs were summarized by John M. Frame, Professor of Systematic Theology and Philosophy, Reformed Theological Seminary, Orlando, Florida, as: "(1) that the seminary faculty maintain close supervision, not only over a student’s academic progress, but also over his social and spiritual development; (2) that the seminary faculty itself consist of men with extensive pastoral experience; (3) that no student be ordained to the ministry until he has spent a time of apprenticeship with an experienced pastor."

His work "Church in the Wilderness" in Fragments from the Study of a Pastor was especially notable.

He was also a trustee of Lafayette College from 1853 to 1861.

He famously moved the controversial Gardiner Spring Resolutions, which were adopted by the General Assembly of the Presbyterian Church in the United States of America in May 1861, and precipitated the creation of the Presbyterian Church in the Confederate States of America and the schism of the Presbyterian Church along regional lines and that lasted from the American Civil War until 1983.

He died on August 18, 1873.

== Selected published works ==
He was an industrious author, and his works, among others, included:

- Essays on the Distinguishing Traits of Christian Character. 1822.
- Appeal to the Citizens of New York in Behalf of the Christian Sabbath.. 1823.
- Excellence and Influence of the Female Character. 1825.
- A Dissertation on Native Depravity. 1833.
- The Will of God Performed on Earth. 1835.
- Fragments from the Study of a Pastor. 1838.
- The Danger and Hope of the American People. 1843.
- Dissertation on the Rule of Faith. 1844.
- The Attraction of the Cross. 1846.
- The Obligations of the World to the Bible. 1846.
- The Bible not of Man. 1847.
- The Bethel Flag. 1848.
- The Power of the Pulpit. 1849.
- Memoirs of the Late Hannah L. Murray. 1849.
- Good Hope Through Grace. 1850.
- The Mercy Seat: Thoughts Suggested by the Lord's Prayer. 1852.
- The Glory of Christ. 1852.
- Short Sermons to the People. 1854.
- First Things. 1855.
- The Contrast Between Good and Bad Men. 1855.
- The Old and the New Church. 1858.
- State Thanksgiving During the Rebellion. 1862.
- The Mission of Sorrow. 1863.
- Personal Reminiscences of the Life and Times of Gardiner Spring. 1866. v. 1.
- The Restoration of Israel.
- The Doctrine of Election.
- Pulpit Ministrations.

Religious titles
Preceded by The Rev. John Todd Edgar	Moderator of the 55th General Assembly of the Presbyterian Church in the United States of America (Old School); 1843–1844	Succeeded by The Rev. George Junkin
