= List of moderators of the General Assembly of the Presbyterian Church in the United States =

Chairpeople of the highest court of the PCUS

The office of the Moderator of the General Assembly was the highest elected position in the Presbyterian Church in the United States (PCUS). The Moderator was responsible for presiding over the meeting of the General Assembly, which was held annually between 1861 and 1983. After the meeting, which lasted for about a week, the Moderator served as an ambassador of the denomination throughout the remainder of the term. After completing the term, most former Moderators took on the role of a church statesman.

The chart below shows the Moderators, and the place of meetings, from 1861 when the PCUS was formed by secession from the Presbyterian Church in the United States of America, until 1983 when the PCUS merged with the United Presbyterian Church in the United States of America to form the present day Presbyterian Church (USA).

== Moderators of PCUS General Assemblies ==
Number and year	Place of meeting	Moderator	Online minutes
1st GA, 1861	Augusta, Georgia	The Rev. Benjamin Morgan Palmer	Minutes of the 1861 General Assembly
2nd GA, 1862	Montgomery, Alabama	The Rev. J. L. Kirkpatrick	Minutes of the 1862 General Assembly
3rd GA, 1863	Columbia, South Carolina	The Rev. James A. Lyon	Minutes of the 1863 General Assembly
4th GA, 1864	Charlotte, North Carolina	The Rev. John S. Wilson	Minutes of the 1864 General Assembly
5th GA, 1865	Macon, Georgia	The Rev. George Howe	Minutes of the 1865 General Assembly
6th GA, 1866	Memphis, Tennessee	The Rev. Andrew Hart Kerr	Minutes of the 1866 General Assembly
7th GA, 1867	Nashville, Tennessee	The Rev. Thomas Verner Moore	Minutes of the 1867 General Assembly
8th GA, 1868	Baltimore, Maryland	The Rev. John N. Waddel	Minutes of the 1868 General Assembly
9th GA, 1869	Mobile, Alabama	The Rev. Stuart Robinson	Minutes of the 1869 General Assembly
10th GA, 1870	Louisville, Kentucky	The Rev. Robert L. Dabney	Minutes of the 1870 General Assembly
11th GA, 1871	Huntsville, Alabama	The Rev. William S. Plumer	Minutes of the 1871 General Assembly
12th GA, 1872	Richmond, Virginia	The Rev. Thomas R. Welch	Minutes of the 1872 General Assembly
13th GA, 1873	Little Rock, Arkansas	The Rev. Henry Martyn Smith	Minutes of the 1873 General Assembly
14th GA, 1874	Columbus, Mississippi	The Rev. John L. Girardeau	Minutes of the 1874 General Assembly
15th GA, 1875	St. Louis, Missouri	The Rev. Moses D. Hoge	Minutes of the 1875 General Assembly
16th GA, 1876	Savannah, Georgia	The Rev. Benjamin M. Smith	Minutes of the 1876 General Assembly
17th GA, 1877	New Orleans, Louisiana	The Rev. C. A. Stillman	Minutes of the 1877 General Assembly
18th GA, 1878	Knoxville, Tennessee	The Rev. T. E. Peck	Minutes of the 1878 General Assembly
19th GA, 1879	Louisville, Kentucky	The Rev. Joseph R. Wilson	Minutes of the 1879 General Assembly
20th GA, 1880	Charleston, South Carolina	The Rev. T. A. Hoyt	Minutes of the 1880 General Assembly
21st GA, 1881	Staunton, Virginia	The Rev. Robert P. Farris	Minutes of the 1881 General Assembly
22nd GA, 1882	Atlanta, Georgia	The Rev. R. K. Smoot	Minutes of the 1882 General Assembly
23rd GA, 1883	Lexington, Kentucky	The Rev. T. Pryor	Minutes of the 1883 General Assembly
24th GA, 1884	Vicksburg, Mississippi	The Rev. T.D. Witherspoon	Minutes of the 1884 General Assembly
25th GA, 1885	Houston, Texas	The Rev. H. R. Raymond	Minutes of the 1885 General Assembly
26th GA, 1886	Augusta, Georgia	The Rev. J. H. Bryson	Minutes of the 1886 General Assembly
27th GA, 1887	St. Louis, Missouri	The Rev. G. B. Strickler	Minutes of the 1887 General Assembly
28th GA, 1888	Baltimore, MD	The Rev. J. J. Bullock	Minutes of the 1888 General Assembly
29th GA, 1889	Chattanooga, Tennessee	The Rev. H. G. Hill	Minutes of the 1889 General Assembly
30th GA, 1890	Asheville, North Carolina	The Rev. James Park	Minutes of the 1890 General Assembly
31st GA, 1891	Birmingham, Alabama	The Rev. Hampden C. DuBose	Minutes of the 1891 General Assembly
32nd GA, 1892	Hot Springs, Arkansas	The Rev. Samuel A. King	Minutes Not Available Online
33rd GA, 1893	Macon, Georgia	Elder J. W. Lapsley	Minutes of the 1893 General Assembly
34th GA, 1894	Nashville, Tennessee	The Rev. James R. Graham	Minutes of the 1894 General Assembly
35th GA, 1895	Dallas, Texas	The Rev. C. R. Hemphill	Minutes of the 1895 General Assembly
36th GA, 1896	Memphis, Tennessee	The Rev. R. Q. Mallard	Minutes of the 1896 General Assembly
37th GA, 1897	Charlotte, North Carolina	The Rev. George T. Goetchius	Minutes of the 1897 General Assembly
38th GA, 1898	New Orleans, Louisiana	The Rev. E. M. Green	Minutes of the 1898 General Assembly
39th GA, 1899	Richmond, Virginia	The Rev. John F. Cannon	Minutes of the 1899 General Assembly
40th GA, 1900	Atlanta, Georgia	Elder Joseph W. Martin	Minutes of the 1900 General Assembly
41st GA, 1901	Little Rock, Arkansas	The Rev. Neander M. Woods	Minutes of the 1901 General Assembly
42nd GA, 1902	Jackson, Mississippi	The Rev. William T. Hall	Minutes of the 1902 General Assembly
43rd GA, 1903	Lexington, Virginia	The Rev. Abner C. Hopkins	Minutes of the 1903 General Assembly
44th GA, 1904	Mobile, Alabama	The Rev. S. M. Neel	Minutes of the 1904 General Assembly
45th GA, 1905	Fort Worth, Texas	The Rev. J. T. Plunkett	Minutes of the 1905 General Assembly
46th GA, 1906	Greenville, South Carolina	Elder Allen G. Hall	Minutes of the 1906 General Assembly
47th GA, 1907	Birmingham, Alabama	The Rev. J. R. Howerton	Minutes of the 1907 General Assembly
48th GA, 1908	Greensboro, North Carolina	The Rev. W. M. Moore	Minutes of the 1908 General Assembly
49th GA, 1909	Savannah, Georgia	The Rev. William E. Boggs	Minutes of the 1909 General Assembly
50th GA, 1910	Lewisburg, West Virginia	The Rev. J. W. Bachman	Minutes of the 1910 General Assembly
51st GA, 1911	Louisville, Kentucky	The Rev. Russell Cecil	Minutes of the 1911 General Assembly
52nd GA, 1912	Bristol, Tennessee	The Rev. Thomas S. Clyce	Minutes of the 1912 General Assembly
53rd GA, 1913	Atlanta, Georgia	The Rev. J. S. Lyons	Minutes of the 1913 General Assembly
54th GA, 1914	Kansas City, Missouri	Elder W. J. Martin	Minutes of the 1914 General Assembly
55th GA, 1915	Newport News, Virginia	The Rev. W. McF. Alexander	Minutes of the 1915 General Assembly
56th GA, 1916	Orlando, Florida	The Rev. C. W. Grafton	Minutes of the 1916 General Assembly
57th GA, 1917	Birmingham, Alabama	The Rev. John M. Wills, Ph.D.	Minutes of the 1917 General Assembly
58th GA, 1918	Durant, Oklahoma	The Rev. James I. Vance	Minutes of the 1918 General Assembly
59th GA, 1919	New Orleans, Louisiana	The Rev. A. M. Fraser	Minutes of the 1919 General Assembly
60th GA, 1920	Charlotte, North Carolina	The Rev. W. L. Lingle	Minutes of the 1920 General Assembly
61st GA, 1921	St. Louis, Missouri	The Rev. A. B. Curry	Minutes of the 1921 General Assembly
62nd GA, 1922	Charleston, West Virginia	The Rev. R. C. Reed	Minutes of the 1922 General Assembly
63rd GA, 1923	Montreat, North Carolina	The Rev. Alexander Spunt	Minutes Not Available Online
64th GA, 1924	San Antonio, Texas	The Rev. Thornton Whaling	Minutes Not Available Online
65th GA, 1925	Lexington, Kentucky	The Rev. Georgia Summey	Minutes Not Available Online
66th GA, 1926	Pensacola, Florida	The Rev. J. W. Skinner	Minutes Not Available Online
67th GA, 1927	El Dorado, Arkansas	The Rev. R. F. Campbell	Minutes Not Available Online
68th GA, 1928	Atlanta, Georgia	The Rev. Harris E. Kirk	Minutes Not Available Online
69th GA, 1929	Montreat, North Carolina	The Rev. W. R. Dobyns	Minutes Not Available Online
70th GA, 1930	Charlottesville, Virginia	The Rev. Thomas W. Currie	Minutes Not Available Online
71st GA, 1931	Montreat, North Carolina	Elder R. A. Dunn	Minutes Not Available Online
72nd GA, 1932	Montreat, North Carolina	The Rev. William Crowe	Minutes Not Available Online
73rd GA, 1933	Montreat, North Carolina	The Rev. Ernest Thompson	Minutes Not Available Online
74th GA, 1934	Montreat, North Carolina	Elder Samuel Hale Sibley	Minutes Not Available Online
75th GA, 1935	Montreat, North Carolina	The Rev. Henry H. Sweets	Minutes Not Available Online
76th GA, 1936	Augusta, Georgia	The Rev. P. Frank Price	Minutes Not Available Online
77th GA, 1937	Montreat, North Carolina	The Rev. D. Clay Lilly	Minutes Not Available Online
78th GA, 1938	Meridian, Mississippi	Elder Willis M. Everett	Minutes Not Available Online
79th GA, 1939	Montreat, North Carolina	The Rev. Edward Mack, Ph.D.	Minutes Not Available Online
80th GA, 1940	Chattanooga, Tennessee	The Rev. Frank C. Brown	Minutes Not Available Online
81st GA, 1941	Montreat, North Carolina	The Rev. Charles E. Diehl	Minutes Not Available Online
82nd GA, 1942	Knoxville, Tennessee	Elder Charles G. Rose	Minutes Not Available Online
83rd GA, 1943	Montreat, North Carolina	The Rev. Donald W. Richardson	Minutes Not Available Online
84th GA, 1944	Montreat, North Carolina	The Rev. Charles L. King	Minutes Not Available Online
85th GA, 1945	Montreat, North Carolina	The Rev. Thomas K. Young	Minutes Not Available Online
86th GA, 1946	Montreat, North Carolina	The Rev. J. B. Green	Minutes Not Available Online
87th GA, 1947	Montreat, North Carolina	The Rev. John R. Cunningham	Minutes Not Available Online
88th GA, 1948	Atlanta, Georgia	The Rev. C. Darby Fulton	Minutes Not Available Online
89th GA, 1949	Montreat, North Carolina	Elder W. E. Price	Minutes Not Available Online
90th GA, 1950	Massanetta Springs, Virginia	The Rev. Ben R. Lacy Jr.	Minutes Not Available Online
91st GA, 1951	Orlando, Florida	Elder James Ross McCain, Ph.D.	Minutes Not Available Online
92nd GA, 1952	Charleston, West Virginia	The Rev. W. A. Alexander Jr.	Minutes Not Available Online
93rd GA, 1953	Montreat, North Carolina	The Rev. Frank W. Price, Ph.D.	Minutes Not Available Online
94th GA, 1954	Montreat, North Carolina	The Rev. Wade H. Boggs	Minutes Not Available Online
95th GA, 1955	Richmond, Virginia	The Rev. J. McDowell Richards	Minutes Not Available Online
96th GA, 1956	Montreat, North Carolina	The Rev. W. Taliaferro Thompson	Minutes Not Available Online
97th GA, 1957	Birmingham, Alabama	The Rev. W. M. Elliott Jr., Ph.D.	Minutes Not Available Online
98th GA, 1958	Charlotte, North Carolina	Elder Philip F. Howerton	Minutes Not Available Online
99th GA, 1959	Atlanta, Georgia	The Rev. Ernest Trice Thompson	Minutes Not Available Online
100th GA, 1960	Jacksonville, Florida	The Rev. Marion A. Boggs	Minutes Not Available Online
101st GA, 1961	Dallas, Texas	The Rev. Wallace M. Alston, Th.D.	Minutes Not Available Online
102nd GA, 1962	Winston-Salem, North Carolina	Elder Edward D. Grant	Minutes Not Available Online
103rd GA, 1963	Huntington, West Virginia	The Rev. William H. McCorkle	Minutes Not Available Online
104th GA, 1964	Montreat, North Carolina	The Rev. Felix B. Gear, Ph.D.	Minutes Not Available Online
105th GA, 1965	Montreat, North Carolina	Elder Samuel J. Patterson	Minutes Not Available Online
106th GA, 1966	Montreat, North Carolina	The Rev. F. H. Caldwell, Ph.D.	Minutes Not Available Online
107th GA, 1967	Bristol, Tennessee	The Rev. Marshall C. Dendy	Minutes Not Available Online
108th GA, 1968	Montreat, North Carolina	The Rev. P. D. Miller	Minutes Not Available Online
109th GA, 1969	Mobile, Alabama	The Rev. R. Matthew Lynn	Minutes Not Available Online
110th GA, 1970	Memphis, Tennessee	The Rev. William A. Benfield Jr.	Minutes Not Available Online
111th GA, 1971	Massanetta Springs, Virginia	The Rev. Ben Lacy Rose	Minutes Not Available Online
112th GA, 1972	Montreat, North Carolina	Elder L. Nelson Bell	Minutes Not Available Online
113th GA, 1973	Fort Worth, Texas	The Rev. Charles E. S. Kraemer	Minutes Not Available Online
114th GA, 1974	Louisville, Kentucky	The Rev. Lawrence W. Bottoms	Minutes Not Available Online
115th GA, 1975	Charlotte, North Carolina	The Rev. Paul M. Edris	Minutes Not Available Online
116th GA, 1976	Tuscaloosa, Alabama	Elder Jule C. Spach	Minutes Not Available Online
117th GA, 1977	Nashville, Tennessee	The Rev. Harvard A. Anderson	Minutes Not Available Online
118th GA, 1978	Shreveport, Louisiana	Elder Sara Bernice Moseley	Minutes Not Available Online
119th GA, 1979	Kansas City, Missouri	The Rev. Albert C. Winn	Minutes Not Available Online
120th GA, 1980	Myrtle Beach, South Carolina	The Rev. David L. Stitt	Minutes Not Available Online
121st GA, 1981	Houston, Texas	Elder Dorothy G. Barnard	Minutes Not Available Online
122nd GA, 1982	Columbus, Georgia	The Rev. John F. Anderson Jr., D.D.	Minutes Not Available Online
123rd GA, 1983	Atlanta, Georgia	The Rev. John F. Anderson Jr., D.D.	Minutes Not Available Online

== See also ==
- List of moderators of the General Assembly of the United Presbyterian Church in the United States of America
- List of moderators of the General Assembly of the Presbyterian Church (USA)
