= Stuart Robinson School =

School in Blackey, Letcher County, Kentucky, United States

Stuart Robinson School was a settlement school in Blackey, Letcher County, Kentucky, established in 1913 as a Presbyterian mission. It closed in 1957, after graduating its last class in 1956.

== Establishment ==
Stuart Robinson School was established in 1913 by Rev. Dr. Edward O. Guerrant. A physician and evangelist, Guerrant was the founder of several schools and churches in eastern Kentucky. Guerrant is said to have been inspired to start a mission in Blackey after he encountered some boys swimming in the nearby river on a Sunday morning in 1910 and discovered that most of the boys had never heard of Sunday school, much less attended one. The school was named for Rev. Stuart Robinson, who had been a pastor of Louisville's Second Presbyterian Church. Robinson was known for both his leadership role among border state Presbyterians during and after the Civil War and his interest in mission work in the mountains of eastern Kentucky. The school had 140 students when it opened.

== Campus and facilities ==
The school was located on a 16-acre (6.5 ha) campus served by the Rockhouse Branch of the L&N Railroad and by Kentucky Route 15. It also maintained a large farm to produce food for the school. School and farm buildings included dormitories and a dining hall, educational buildings, a library, a gymnasium, houses for teachers, and a dairy barn, silo, and milk house with equipment for pasteurization and refrigeration. By its final years, the campus expanded from 16 to 66 acres (27 ha).

== School program ==
Stuart Robinson School was coeducational and operated as a day and boarding school with twelve grades. Most students were enrolled in a work-study program, which the school called its "Work Scholarship plan", through which students could earn all or part of the cost of their education and board. Boys typically did farm and gardening work, installed fencing, fired the school's furnaces, worked at carpentry, or maintained plumbing and electrical wiring. Girls did cooking and housekeeping work in the school's kitchen, dining room and dormitories.

The school fielded interscholastic teams in football and basketball. Extracurricular activities included a glee club, a home economics club, and literary societies.

Throughout its history, the school operated as a Presbyterian mission. In 1935 it was described as the Presbyterian church's largest school.

== Closure ==
The school closed after Letcher County built public schools in the nearby community of Letcher. It graduated its last class in 1956 and closed in 1957, after which time the Southern Presbyterian Church sold the property. The school property is now used as Calvary Campus, a Christian camp, education facility, and retreat center.

== Alumni ==
A school fundraising pamphlet stated that more than half of Stuart Robinson's graduates went on to college, and that many later returned to mountain communities in eastern Kentucky "to teach school to their lesser-enlightened neighbors" and sometimes "organized Sunday Schools where they have never before existed." Notable alumni of the Stuart Robinson School include Juanita Kreps, U.S. Secretary of Commerce under President Jimmy Carter, and Gurney Norman, author and university professor whose novel Divine Right's Trip was published in serial form in the Whole Earth Catalog.
