= Jennie Hanna =

American missionary worker (1856–1924)

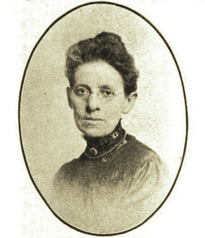
Hanna in 1913

Jennie Hanna (1856-1924) was an American missionary worker and co-founder of the Woman's Auxiliary of the Presbyterian Church, U.S. (PCUS). Disabled for many years, she made the building of the Woman's Auxiliary the whole purpose of her life.

== Early life and education ==
Jennie Hanna was born in DeKalb County, Missouri, in 1856. Her father was Thomas K. Hanna. He was for many years an elder in the Presbyterian Church in the United States (PCUS), Superintendent of the Sunday School, which he supported with his time and financial donations. Jennie's mother, Judith Joyce Venable, was a daughter of Dr. Joseph Morton Venable. The Venables were related to the Scotch and Huguenot families who settled in Virginia and the Carolinas, and whose descendants moved to Kentucky. The Venables came from Shelby County, Kentucky, to Missouri.

In 1868, Jennie and her parents movedto Kansas City, Missouri. Jennie helped care for the younger children in the growing family while also working in the PCUS. Her siblings included sisters Mrs. A. A. Whipple, Mrs. Luther Welsh, and Miss Edith J. Hanna, and brothers, John V., W. B., and Thomas K. Hanna.

Hanna attended Elizabeth Aull Seminary in Lexington, Missouri where, in 1874, she received certificates in all her studies: final in philosophy, chemistry, astronomy and arithmetic, and intermediate in algebra, geometry and moral science.

== Career ==
At the age of 19, Hanna became interested in a Sunday school class of young girls whom she organized into a missionary class at the suggestion of her pastor's wife, Eleanor Boude (Mrs. Henry B. Boude). It was through Hanna's efforts to train the young girls in missionary service that a vision came to her which resulted in the organization of the Woman's Auxiliary.

According to Hanna, when she and her group became involved their work, they felt the need of being attached to some organized body for guidance and information. As there was nothing in the PCUS which they could join, and the Presbyterian Church in the United States of America (PCUSA) ("Northern Presbyterian Church") women had a system in operation in Missouri, Hanna took her group to the Woman's Board of Missions of the Southwest (St. Louis, Missouri). There, Hanna found the counsel, inspiration, and practical training she needed. She thought seriously of joining the PCUSA just because of their woman's work. But the counsel of Dr. M. H. Houston, then Secretary of American Southern Presbyterian Mission, kept Hanna attached to the PCUS. His advice was to try to arouse interest with the Southern women and see if cooperation could be attained among them.

She visited Chicago for several months in 1881. In 1884, Hanna launched a discussion in PCUS papers as to the advisability of organizing the societies in each Presbytery into a Presbyterial Union similar to the plan which the PCUSA had had in operation for years. Hanna's first article in the church papers caught the attention of Emma Longstreet Sibley (Mrs. Josiah Sibley), of Augusta, Georgia. Two years later, Hanna and Sibley, in spite of outspoken opposition of some of the leading ministers of the Church, agreed to unite in an effort to reach every one of the 2,000 churches in the PCUS with a plan for Presbyterial organizations for Foreign Missions, looking eventually toward establishing a Woman's Board similar to that in the PCUSA. Hanna possessed a training in systems through her association with her father, which proved invaluable in this work. In addition, she was a good writer.

They gathered the names of the active missionary women in every church. They wrote hundreds of circular letters, copied on the cyclostyle. Many of the letters were unanswered; but some pastors did respond. Then the two women sent hundreds of other letters, both written and printed, to the women they located, making the strongest appeal they could for organization, setting forth its necessity and advantages. Sibley helped to raise the funds for printing and postage, so did the Woman's Society of Central Church, Kansas City. In 1888, Hanna and Sibley wrote an appeal to the women at large, which was published in the Louisville Christian Observer. While it seemed moderate and temperate to some, others saw it to espouse an undercurrent of woman's suffrage. There were many ministers who regarded the Woman's Auxiliary movement as "unscriptural, un-Presbyterian, un-womanly".

Hanna became the first President of the Woman's Missionary Society of Central Church, Kansas City, Missouri, which, more than any other society in the PCUS, was responsible for the Woman's Auxiliary formed later. She introduced mission study into this Society with the first interdenominational study book issued by the Central Committee of United Mission Study, and continued it for years. She was called the walking encyclopedia of mission facts.

In 1894, Hanna was largely instrumental in organizing the Woman's Presbyterian Union of Kansas City, composed of all the Presbyterian Churches of Kansas City and vicinity, some thirty in number, and for years, was the Secretary of Literature of that organization which held large semi-annual meetings.

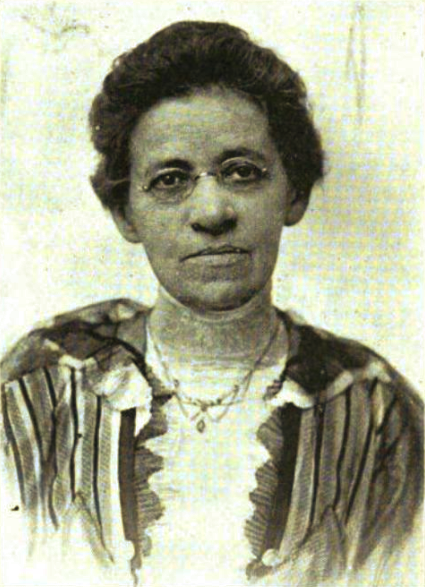
Hanna in 1923

Hanna was able to meet with the PCUS women at large only once, as her health was never up for a visit to the summer sessions at Montreat, North Carolina or to the Woman's Advisory Committee. In May 1914, the Woman's Advisory Committee, then the Woman's Council, met in Kansas City and Hanna was the honored guest. At that meeting, Hanna read a history of the organization of the Auxiliary, which was afterwards printed and for eight years, was circulated throughout the PCUS.

On the tenth anniversary of the Bristol, Tennessee Assembly, which gave its approval to the establishment of the Woman's Auxiliary, the Assembly expressed to Hanna the appreciation of the PCUS for her service in promoting the organization of the women of the Church.

Though she was disabled for several years, she was active in her local church, the Central Presbyterian in Kansas City, Missouri, especially in missionary work, until a few years before her death when her health compelled her to give it up.

== Death and legacy ==
Jennie Hanna died at Saint Luke's Hospital of Kansas City, on June 30, 1924.

An announcement was made in October 1924 regarding a memorial service for Hanna, founder of the women's work of the church, to be featured at the 4-day meeting of the Missouri Synodical Auxiliary of the PCUS convening later that month.

== Selected works ==
- "Concerning Praise Meetings", Presbyterian Survey (January 1913), vol. 2, pp. 187-88 (text)
- "The History of the Woman's Auxiliary" (leaflet), The Presbyterian Record (June 1915)
