= Manteno, Illinois =

- Village
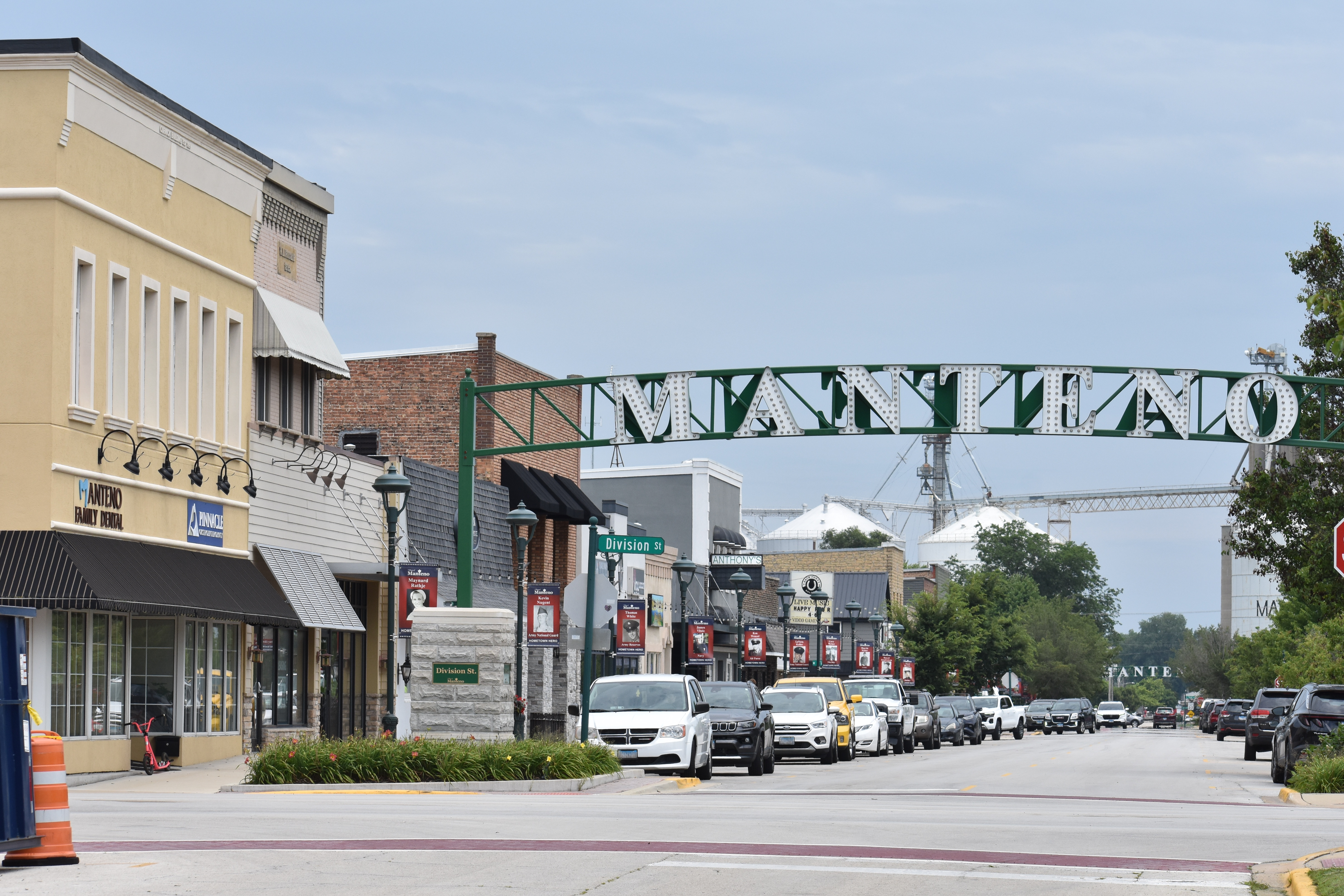
- Downtown Manteno
- Motto(s): "Village of Values and Opportunities"
- Location of Manteno in Kankakee County, Illinois

- Location of Illinois in the United States
- Coordinates: 41°15′04″N 87°52′44″W
- Country: United States
- State: Illinois
- County: Kankakee
- Township: Manteno
- Established: 1855

Government
  - Mayor: Annette LaMore

Area
  - Total: 5.38 sq mi (13.9 km^{2})
  - Land: 5.34 sq mi (13.8 km^{2})
  - Water: 0.03 sq mi (0.078 km^{2}) 0.63%
- Elevation: 676 ft (206 m)

Population (2020)
  - Total: 9,210
  - Density: 1,720/sq mi (666/km^{2})
- Time zone: UTC-6 (CST)
  - Summer (DST): UTC-5 (CDT)
- ZIP code: 60950
- Area codes: 815 and 779
- FIPS code: 17-46500
- GNIS feature ID: 2399245
- Website: www.villageofmanteno.com

Manteno is a village in Kankakee County, Illinois, United States. The population was 9,210 at the 2020 census. It is part of the Kankakee-Bourbonnais-Bradley Metropolitan Statistical Area.

== History ==
=== Origins of village name ===
Manteno was named after Manteno (Mawteno), a daughter of Francois Bourbonnais Jr. (thus her grandfather was the man for whom the city of Bourbonnais was named) and his Potawatomi wife. A Potawatomi name, it is a possible anglicization of manito or manitou, a Potawatomi word for "spirit". Oliver W. Barnard, an early settler in this area, spelled her name "Mantenau" in a poem, romanticizing the Potawatomi maiden. Other 19th century books spell it "Mawteno" and "Manteno".

Because she was of Potawatomi descent, Mawteno (spelled phonetically in the treaty, "Maw-te-no") was given a section of land, now part of Kankakee County, near Soldier Creek, by the treaty of Treaty of Tippecanoe of 1832.

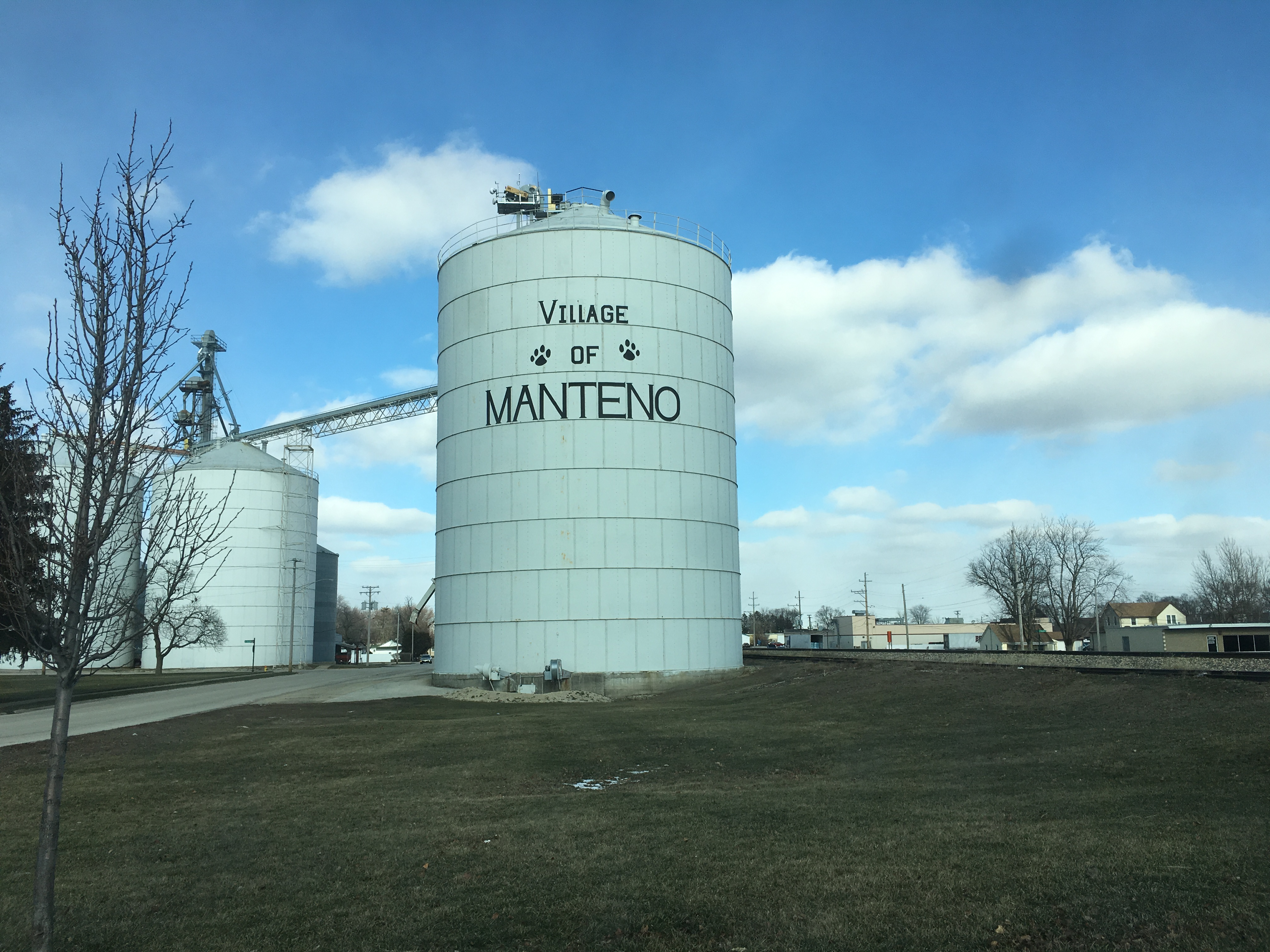
Manteno's Grain Silos/Towers

=== Incorporation ===
Both Kankakee and Iroquois counties were part of Will County, Illinois, before the State Legislature granted a plea of Kankakee's citizens and permitted them to incorporate in 1853.

The present township of Manteno was then the east half of the township of Rockville. On March 12, 1855, the town's petition that the area become the township of Manteno was granted by the county's board of supervisors.

The village was incorporated in 1869.

== Geography ==
Manteno is located in northern Kankakee County and is bordered to the south by the village of Bourbonnais. The average elevation is 675 ft (206 m).

Interstate 57 passes through the west side of the village, with access from Exit 322. I-57 leads south 10 miles (16 km) to Kankakee, the county seat, and north 47 miles (76 km) to Chicago. Illinois Route 50 passes through the center of Manteno as Locust Street and leads north 6 miles (10 km) to Peotone and south 8 miles (13 km) to Bradley.

According to the 2021 census gazetteer files, Manteno has a total area of 5.38 square miles (13.93 km^{2}), of which 5.34 square miles (13.83 km^{2}) (or 99.37%) is land and 0.03 square miles (0.08 km^{2}) (or 0.63%) is water.

== Demographics ==
Historical population
Census	Pop.	Note	%±
1880	632		—
1890	627		−0.8%
1900	932		48.6%
1910	1,229		31.9%
1920	1,182		−3.8%
1930	1,149		−2.8%
1940	1,537		33.8%
1950	1,789		16.4%
1960	2,225		24.4%
1970	2,864		28.7%
1980	3,155		10.2%
1990	3,488		10.6%
2000	6,414		83.9%
2010	9,204		43.5%
2020	9,210		0.1%
U.S. Decennial Census

=== 2020 census ===
As of the 2020 census, Manteno had a population of 9,210. The median age was 44.2 years. 21.2% of residents were under the age of 18 and 21.3% of residents were 65 years of age or older. For every 100 females there were 96.1 males, and for every 100 females age 18 and over there were 92.2 males age 18 and over.

99.2% of residents lived in urban areas, while 0.8% lived in rural areas.

There were 3,802 households in Manteno, of which 27.6% had children under the age of 18 living in them. Of all households, 51.6% were married-couple households, 16.9% were households with a male householder and no spouse or partner present, and 25.1% were households with a female householder and no spouse or partner present. About 28.7% of all households were made up of individuals and 14.2% had someone living alone who was 65 years of age or older.

There were 4,008 housing units, of which 5.1% were vacant. The homeowner vacancy rate was 1.9% and the rental vacancy rate was 7.8%.

Racial composition as of the 2020 census
Race	Number	Percent
White	8,204	89.1%
Black or African American	151	1.6%
American Indian and Alaska Native	16	0.2%
Asian	73	0.8%
Native Hawaiian and Other Pacific Islander	5	0.1%
Some other race	188	2.0%
Two or more races	573	6.2%
Hispanic or Latino (of any race)	591	6.4%

=== Income and poverty ===
The median income for a household in the village was $71,576, and the median income for a family was $98,529. Males had a median income of $55,278 versus $37,595 for females. The per capita income for the village was $36,235. About 2.6% of families and 4.5% of the population were below the poverty line, including 4.6% of those under age 18 and 0.9% of those age 65 or over.

== Economy ==
Manteno is located approximately 50 miles (80 km) south of Chicago's loop. There is a combination of industrial and agricultural employers in town. Farmers Elevator Company of Manteno stands as the tallest site in town, with the ability to house 2 million bushels of corn or soybeans at any one time.

Manteno is home the Diversatech Industrial Park is on the east side of town. It contains many diversified industrial plants and warehousing complexes.

Manteno State Hospital, one of the largest psychiatric hospitals in the country when it opened in 1928, was located 2 miles (3 km) southeast of the village. It received its first patients in 1930 and closed in 1985. That closure and the 1983 closure of Hilman Hospital, a general medical hospital, brought economic stagnation to the town. The north half of the original campus of the state hospital has been turned into a veterans' home. Some buildings have been torn down and housing has been put up. A lot of the buildings have been renovated, and very few buildings on the south side of the campus are left in original condition, but are still abandoned.

== Education ==
Manteno Public Schools are part of the Manteno Community Unit School District 5. The district has an elementary school, middle school and high school. Students attend Manteno High School. The schools together have about 2,200 students.

== Transportation ==
River Valley Metro provides bus service on Route 9 connecting Manteno to destinations in the Kankakee area.

Although the village once had direct access to Chicago via a interurban line, the Chicago & Interurban Traction Railway, that railroad has not operated since the 1920s. The Metra Electric station in University Park, 16 miles (26 km) north of Manteno, is the closest rail access.

== Notable people ==
- Fred Sylvester Breen, Arizona newspaper editor and politician, born in Manteno
- George R. Lawrence, photography and aviation pioneer; lived in Manteno and is buried there
- John Moisant, aviator, lived in Manteno
- Charles A. Spring, son of Samuel Spring; helped establish the First Presbyterian Church of Manteno (1859)
- Maurice Francis “Clipper” Smith (1898–1984). A versatile Notre Dame athlete from Manteno, Illinois, Smith played from 1916 to 1920, serving as George Gipp’s backup at left halfback before World War I and returning afterward to anchor the line as a guard on the 1919 and 1920 teams.
- Elizabeth Packard, crusader/activist for married women's property rights and the rights of the mentally ill.
