= Benjamin Morgan Palmer =

American minister and activist (1818–1902)

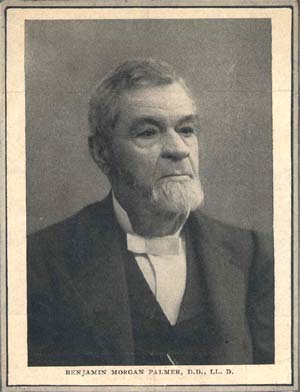
Benjamin Morgan Palmer

Benjamin Morgan Palmer (January 25, 1818 – May 28, 1902) was a Presbyterian minister and theologian in the United States. He served as first Moderator of the Presbyterian Church in the United States (PCUS) in 1861.

== Life ==
Palmer was born in Charleston, South Carolina in 1818 and became a minister in the Southern Presbyterian church. He served in Georgia (1841–42), South Carolina (1843–55) and New Orleans (1856–1902). He received his Doctor of Divinity degree in 1852.

The PCUS was formed by secession from the Presbyterian Church in the United States of America in 1861 as a result of the American Civil War. Dr Palmer was appointed Moderator of its first General Assembly in 1861.

He advocated heavily for the secession of Louisiana from the United States to join the Confederacy, with his notorious "Thanksgiving Sermon" serving as a major catalyst for the Confederate movement.

He died in 1902 after an accident in New Orleans.

== Legacy ==
Palmer Park in New Orleans was named after him during Jim Crow, but due to his support for slavery, was renamed after Ellis Marsalis Jr. on July 1, 2021.

== Publications ==
- 1875 The Life and Letters of James Henley Thornwell, B.M. Palmer.
- 1894 The Theology of Prayer, B.M. Palmer.
- 1906 The Life and Letters of Benjamin Morgan Palmer by T.C. Johnson.
