= Hallie Paxson Winsborough =

American church worker

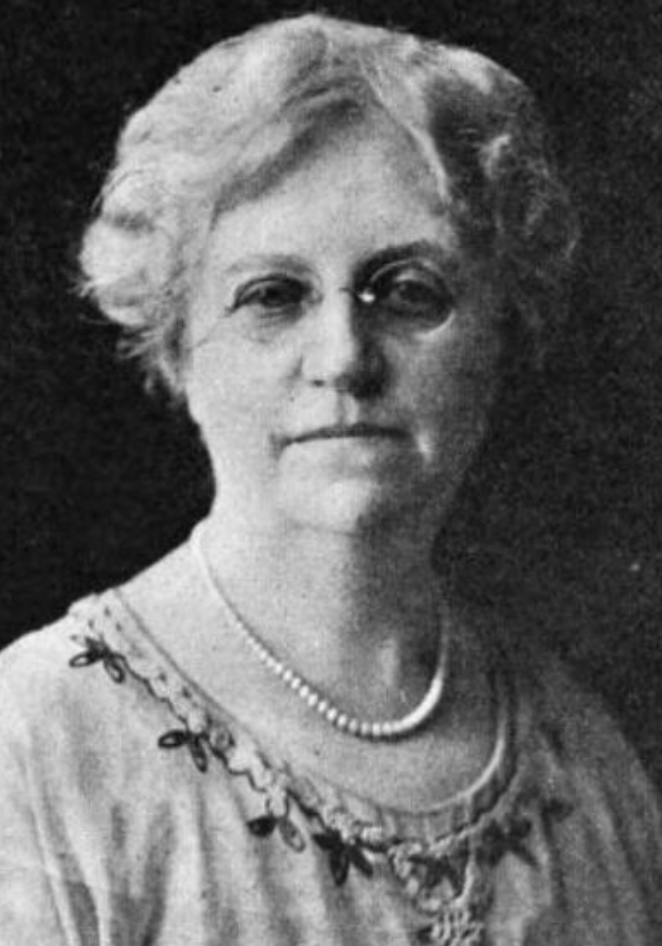
- Hallie Paxson Winsborough, from a 1923 publication
- Born: March 7, 1865; Mason City, Illinois, United States
- Died: June 20, 1940 (aged 75); Davenport, Iowa, United States
- Education: Fulton Female Synodical College
- Occupation(s): Church leader, clubwoman, activist

Hallie Paxson Winsborough (March 7, 1865 – June 20, 1940) was an American church worker. As the first Secretary of the Woman's Auxiliary of the Presbyterian Church, U.S., she worked for civil rights and interracial cooperation, especially in the American South. She was also a founding member of the Association of Southern Women for the Prevention of Lynching (AWSPL).

== Early life ==
Hallie Paxson was born in Mason City, Illinois, and raised in St. Louis, the daughter of William P. Paxson and Harriet Missouri Swing Paxson. Her father was an ordained Presbyterian minister from a family active in church work. She attended Fulton Female Synodical College, a church-run women's college in Fulton, Missouri.

== Career ==
Winsborough, "an organizational whirlwind", taught school as a young woman. In 1908, she investigated living conditions among the Italian immigrants in Kansas City, and wrote a report that led to the founding of the Italian Mission and the Slavic Mission, Presbyterian outreach programs.

From 1912 to 1929, Winsborough was the first Secretary (or Superintendent) of Women's Work for the Presbyterian Church in the United States (PCUS), the Southern body of Presbyterians after the American denomination's split over slavery in 1861. She started a series of "Colored Women's Conferences" to bring more Black women into active roles in the church. In 1922, she visited a mission school for girls in Japan, and started a denomination-wide "birthday offering" fundraiser to support mission projects. In 1923, she gave a nationally publicized speech to the Executive Council of the Federal Council of Churches meeting in Ohio, in which she denounced the Ku Klux Klan and exhorted American Christians to work against racism and for interracial cooperation. In 1927 she was the first woman allowed to address the denomination's General Assembly. She resigned from the national secretary position in 1929, for health reasons, but remained involved in the programs she helped to launch for ten further years.

Beyond church settings, Winsborough was active in the Commission on Interracial Cooperation (CIC), and was a founding member of the Association of Southern Women for the Prevention of Lynching (ASWPL). In 1925, she was an American delegate to the ecumenical World Conference of Life and Work, in Stockholm.

== Publications ==
- "The Woman's Building at Montreat" (1917)
- "Summer Conferences for Colored Women" (1922)
- "A Visit to Carlotta Kemper Seminary" (1925)
- The Woman's Auxiliary, Presbyterian Church U.S. (1927)
- Yesteryears (1937)
- Glorious Living (1937)

== Personal life and legacy ==
Hallie Paxson married lawyer William Calvert Winsborough in 1888. They had six children together. Her daughter Zue died in childhood in 1895; her youngest child, Hal, died in 1938. She died in 1940, at the age of 75, in Davenport, Iowa.

Winsborough Hall, the first women's dormitory at Stillman College, was named in her memory, as was a building at Montreat Conference Center in North Carolina. Her grandson Halliman H. Winsborough was a professor at the University of Wisconsin. Her granddaughter and namesake, Hallie Paxson Davis Christian, was an engineer, and an ordained Methodist minister.
