= Spirituality of the Church =

Doctrine declaring church a spiritual entity

The Spirituality of the Church is a doctrine in Protestant theology, particularly in American Presbyterianism. It states that the church is a spiritual entity rather than a civil one, and so its primary task is to proclaim a spiritual message rather than engage in political activity.

The roots of the concept are found in the Protestant Reformation: Martin Luther said that "the true, real, right, essential Church is a spiritual thing". This was developed by Scottish Presbyterianism in the sixteenth century: the Second Book of Discipline (1578) explained how the magistrate and the minister exercise jurisdiction over different spheres. The phrase itself was first used in the 1850s in the Presbyterian Church in the United States of America. Southern Presbyterians such as James Henley Thornwell argued on the basis of this doctrine that the Church should say nothing in condemnation of slavery. Charles Hodge, on the other hand, rejected this implication, but still used the doctrine to argue against the Gardiner Spring Resolutions.

Morton H. Smith notes that when the Presbyterian Church in America adopting a position opposing women in combat in 1993, "it was not forwarded to the government because of the principle of the spiritual mission of the Church."
