= Gurney Norman =

American poet (1937–2025)

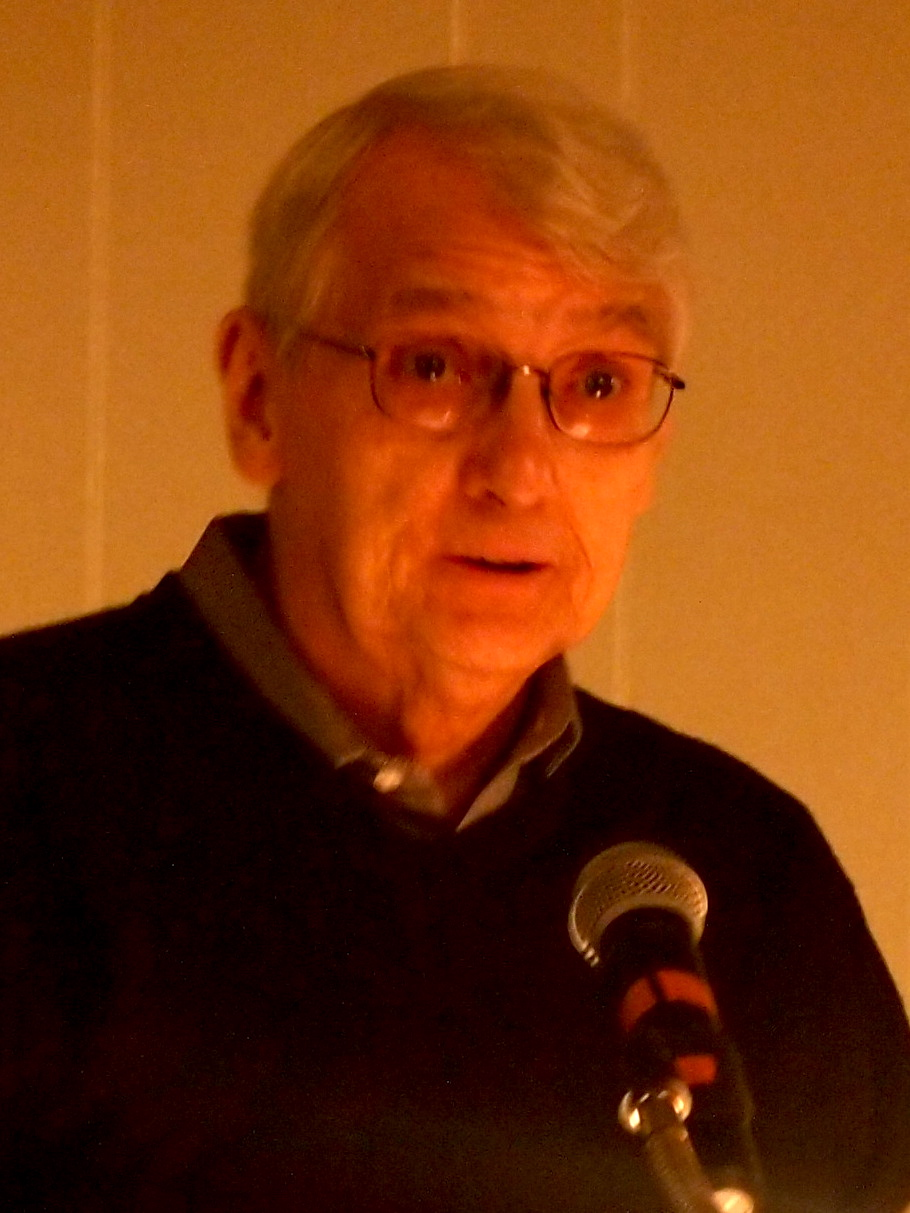
- Norman in 2021
- Born: July 22, 1937; Grundy, Virginia, U.S.
- Died: October 12, 2025 (aged 88)
- Education: Stuart Robinson School; University of Kentucky; Stanford University
- Occupations: Writer; documentarian; academic

Gurney Musick Norman (July 22, 1937 – October 12, 2025) was an American writer, documentarian, Kentucky poet laureate and academic.

== Life and career ==
Gurney Norman was born in Grundy, Virginia, on July 22, 1937, to Howard A. Norman and Thelma J. Musick Norman. He grew up in the southern Appalachian Mountains and was raised alternately by his maternal grandparents in Southwest Virginia and his paternal grandparents in Eastern Kentucky in several towns, but primarily in the small community of Allais, near Hazard, in Perry County. He attended Stuart Robinson School in Letcher County, Kentucky, from 1946 to 1955. Norman attended the University of Kentucky from 1955 to 1959, graduating with a degree in journalism and English. In 1960, he received a Wallace Stegner Fellowship in Creative Writing at Stanford University where he studied with literary critic Malcolm Cowley and the Irish short story writer Frank O'Connor.

After Stanford, Norman spent two years in the U.S. Army. He returned to eastern Kentucky in 1963 to work as a reporter for his hometown newspaper, The Hazard Herald. Leaving newspaper work to concentrate on his fiction writing, Norman took a job with the U.S. Forest Service as a fire lookout in the Cascade Mountains of Oregon in the summers of 1966 and 1967. In 1971, his novel Divine Right's Trip was published in The Last Whole Earth Catalog and subsequently by the Dial Press and Bantam Books. Norman was one of the founders of the Briarpatch Network in 1974, with Richard Raymond and Michael Phillips. In 1977, his book of short stories Kinfolks, which received Berea College's Weatherford Award, was published by Gnomon Press.

In 1979, Norman joined the faculty of the University of Kentucky as an associate professor of English. He served as director of the English Department's Creative Writing Program from 2000 to 2014. He retired from the University of Kentucky Department of English in 2022 and was professor emeritus.

In 1996, his work as a fiction writer, filmmaker, and cultural advocate was honored at the Fifteenth Annual Emory and Henry College Literary Festival, which celebrates significant writers in the Appalachian region. In 2002, he was honored by the Eastern Kentucky Leadership Conference for outstanding contribution to the advancement of regional arts and culture. In 2007, the Appalachian Studies Association awarded Norman the Helen M. Lewis Community Service Award, which recognizes exemplary contributions to Appalachia through involvement with and service to its people and communities. He has served as Senior Writer-in-Residence at Hindman Settlement School's annual Appalachian Writers Workshop. Norman was selected to serve as the 2009–2010 Poet Laureate for the Commonwealth of Kentucky, and was officially installed as Laureate on April 24, 2009. On May 8, 2011, Norman was awarded an honorary Doctor of Humane Letters degree from Berea College. On February 13, 2019, he was inducted into the Kentucky Writers Hall of Fame, which recognizes distinguished Kentucky writers whose work reflects the state's rich literary heritage. In 2021, he was inducted into the University of Kentucky College of Arts and Sciences Hall of Fame. In November 2023, the University of Kentucky held a two-day celebration in Norman's honor called Gurneyfest, which featured musical performances, panel discussions, film showings, and readings of his work. He lived in Lexington, Kentucky.

Norman died on October 12, 2025, at the age of 88.

== Writing ==
Divine Right's Trip follows DR Davenport and Estelle, a pair of hippie stoners who leave California for eastern Kentucky, where they settle on a farm raising rabbits. The novel was originally serialized in The Last Whole Earth Catalog.

Kinfolks is a book of short stories concerning young Wilgus Collier and his relationships with his family members.

Ancient Creek is a satirical folktale about a rebellion by mountain people against an absurd and oppressive king in a mythical American region.

Allegiance is an autobiography told through stories—a rich personal journey into Norman's life, place, and consciousness. In classic short stories, lyrical meditations, folktales, dreamscapes, and stream-of-consciousness writing, Norman imaginatively weaves together the threads of his life.

== Filmography ==
=== As writer and presenter ===
- 1987 – Time on the River - A historical look at the important role the Kentucky River played in the settlement of the state. KET production.
- 1989 – From This Valley - Explores the Big Sandy region of Eastern Kentucky, including its trails, people, history, and literary heritage. KET production.
- 1991 – Wilderness Road - Retraces the route of the famous pioneer trail from Kingsport, Tennessee, to Boonesborough, Kentucky. KET production.

=== Based on Norman's work ===
- 2000 – The Wilgus Stories - Dramatization of three Norman short stories--"Fat Monroe," "Night Ride" and "Maxine"—by filmmaker Andrew Garrison.

== Publications ==
=== Fiction ===
- Book One From Crazy Quilt: A Novel in Progress (Monterey, KY: Larkspur Press), 1990.
- Divine Right's Trip: A Folk-Tale (New York: Dial Press), 1972. ISBN 0-917788-42-7
- Kinfolks: The Wilgus Stories (Frankfort, KY: Gnomon Press), 1977. ISBN 0-917788-07-9
- Ancient Creek: A Folktale (Lexington, KY: Old Cove Press), 2012. ISBN 0-967542-42-1
- Allegiance: Stories (Lexington, KY: Old Cove Press), 2022. ISBN 978-1956855029

=== Nonfiction ===
- An American Vein: Critical Readings in Appalachian Literature with Danny Miller and Sharon Hatfield (Athens, OH: Ohio University Press), 2005. ISBN 0-8214-1589-1
- Confronting Appalachian Stereotypes: Back Talk from an American Region with Dwight B. Billings and Katherine Ledford (Lexington, KY: University Press of Kentucky), 1999. ISBN 0-8131-2099-3
