= Woman's Auxiliary of the Presbyterian Church, U.S. =

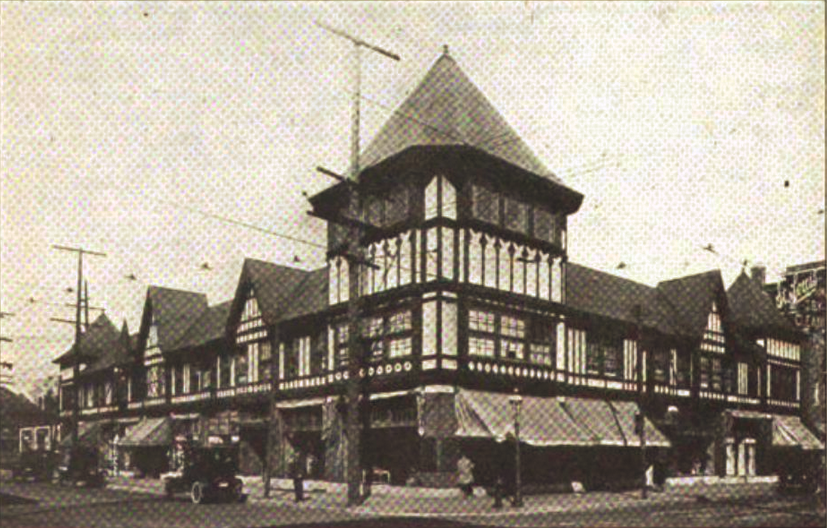
Woman's Auxiliary headquarters, Field Building, St. Louis, Missouri

The Woman's Auxiliary of the Presbyterian Church, U.S. was an American women's religious organization established at Montreat, North Carolina, August 1912. The organization was auxiliary to the work of the Presbyterian Church in the United States (PCUS) (also known as the "Southern Presbyterian Church") and became the only woman's organization in it. The headquarters were located in the Field Building, St. Louis, Missouri. Annual meetings were held in July at the Summer Assembly grounds at Montreat.

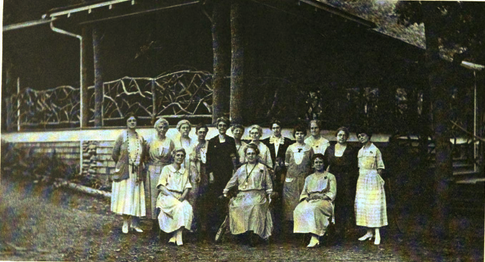
The Auxiliary's Woman's Advisory Coummittee of 1922 at Winsborough Building, Montreat, North Carolina

In response to an overture from the synodical of Missouri, approved by the Synod of Missouri, the General Assembly, meeting at Bristol, Tennessee, in 1912, authorized the establishment of an overhead organization of the women of the Church and the appointment of a superintendent for that department of the work of the Church. Through this overture, the women requested that the organization function entirely as an Auxiliary, that it include all the departments of the work of the Church, and that it be under the supervision of a committee made up of the Executive Secretaries of the four Executive Committees of the Assembly. The plan of organization was entirely original and unique in that no other Church had ever organized its women members along similar lines. The following August, the Executive Secretaries, meeting with the Presidents of the five Synodicals then existing and other leading women, erected the Woman's Auxiliary, appointed the Superintendent and authorized the establishment of an office. The women agreed to finance the work for two years until it should justify its existence. By the next meeting of the Assembly, nine months later, every Synod in the Church had its Synodical save one, which organized four months later. Every Presbytery had its Presbyterial, and the local societies were committed to a plan of uniform study of all the causes of the Church embodied in a Year Book of Programs which had been issued to them. Channels through which the women in the local churches could be reached were established and the work began to grow substantially. At the end of the two probationary years, the Auxiliary was able to present to the Assembly meeting in Kansas City in 1914, a completed organization, working under standardized methods, rapidly adopting a uniform educational program which included the whole program of the Church, and with all these accomplishments, every bill had been paid and a good supply of organization literature was on hand as well as a fair amount of office equipment. The General Assembly directed the four Executive Committees to assume the full and liberal support of the organization from that time on.

== Presbyterial organization ==
Although practically every Southern Presbyterian Church of any size had its woman's organization, there was no department in the Church responsible for promoting among these societies uniformity of organization or efficiency in operation. While probably amenable to sessional control, these societies were giving their money to whatever cause made its special appeal to them. No educational policy prevailed in the Church for these groups of women, nor was any branch of church machinery responsible for making their work more efficient.

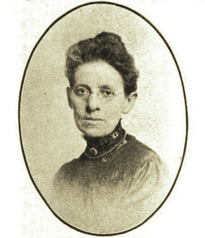
Jennie Hanna

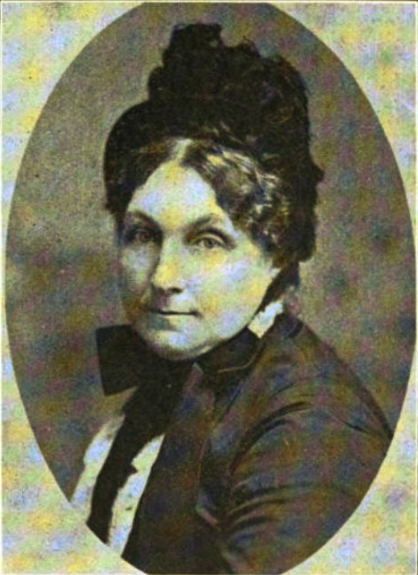
Emma Longstreet Sibley

In 1884, however, came the beginning in woman's organized work. Jennie Hanna, of Kansas City, Missouri, a woman of Presbyterian ancestry and strong church loyalty, launched a discussion in the Church papers as to the advisability of organizing the societies in each Presbytery into a Presbyterial Union similar to the plan which the Northern Presbyterian Church had had in operation for years. Hanna's first article in the Church papers challenged the attention of Emma Longstreet Sibley (Mrs. Josiah Sibley), of Augusta, Georgia, a woman of the same vision and ideals, and together these two women, separated by hundreds of miles, worked for better organization among women's societies of the Southern Presbyterian Church.

In the year 1886, Hanna and Sibley, in spite of outspoken opposition of some of the leading ministers of the Church, agreed to unite in an effort to reach every one of the 2,000 churches in the Southern Assembly with a plan for Presbyterial organizations for Foreign Missions, looking eventually toward establishing a Woman's Board similar to that in the Presbyterian Church, U. S. A. The task was immense as they had no funds at their disposal, no office machinery for duplicating letters, no stenographer, or even typewriter, nor did they reckon on the fierce opposition of the conservative leaders. The result of the earnest effort on the part of these two women was the wakening of the women membership of the Church to the need of further organization, and May 1888, saw the establishment of two Presbyterials: East Hanover, Virginia and Wilmington, North Carolina. Both of these Presbyterials were organized for Foreign Missions only. Within the next year, a number of Presbyterials came into being, though opposing ministers delayed many others until years later.

== Synodical organization ==
In 1904, the first Synodical organizations were effected, those of the Synodical Auxiliary of Virginia and the Synodical Auxiliary of Texas. Although widely separated, the women of the farthest east Synod and those of the farthest west Synod took the advance step of Synodical organization during the same year. Four years later, the Synodical Auxiliary of Alabama was organized, and in 1910, the Synodical Auxiliary of Missouri, while the same year, the Synodical Auxiliary of Georgia was organized. In 1911, the Synodical Auxiliary of Kentucky was set up. The remaining nine Synodicals were organized in the year 1913, the Synodical of Appalachia coming into being in 1916, immediately after the erection of the Synod of Appalachia.

== Progress towards organizing a woman's auxiliary ==
Although the Southern Presbyterian Church was among the first to have a local woman's missionary society, the progress to higher forms of organization had been slow. Seventy-one years had elapsed from the first society of which there was any record to the establishment of the first Presbyterial. Not until fourteen years after the first Presbyterials were the first Synodicals organized in 1904. The year 1912 found all but two of the Presbyterials in existence and only six Synodicals, but no step had been taken looking toward a general overhead organization that should unite these. In the meantime, the woman's work of other denominations had long since been set up into efficient Woman's Boards. In 1912, the Southern Presbyterian Church was the only evangelical denomination of any importance that had no general organization for its woman's work.

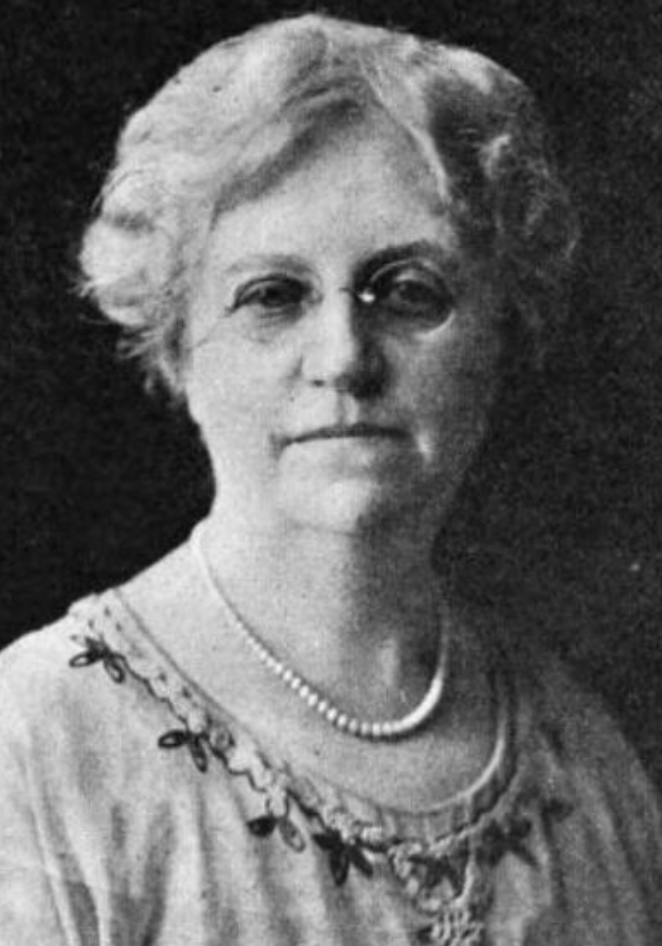
Hallie Paxson Winsborough

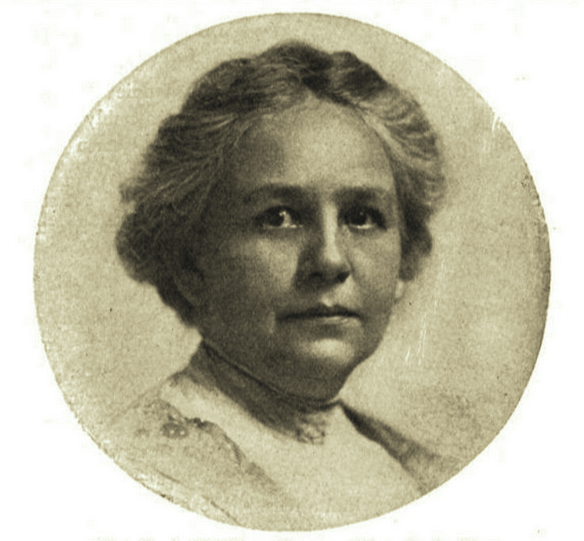
Elizabeth Talbott McMillan

The women of the Southern Presbyterian Church were not now desirous of an independent Woman's Board. Even as early as 1912 indications were in evidence that the Woman's Board, gathering its own funds and administering them, would soon become an antiquated form of organization. The manifest disadvantages of the plan of having a two-headed administration on the foreign field were being realized in many quarters, and already the plan of electing women to membership in the general Missionary Boards was being considered. The leaders among the women, however, felt that we had been all too long without an effective organization for the promotion of educational and spiritual development, and that some plan should be adopted which would give to the women of the Church the benefits accruing from uniformity in plan and purpose as well as a Secretary with headquarters for promoting these objects.

In September 1911, Hallie Paxson Winsborough (Mrs. W. C. Winsborough), of Kansas City, Missouri, prepared a statement entitled "Some Reasons Why a Woman Secretary Is Needed," and sent the paper to Elizabeth Talbott McMillan (Mrs. D. A. McMillan), then President of the Missouri Synodical Auxiliary. McMillan approved of the statement, submitted it to her Executive Committee and with their endorsement, forwarded it to the Presidents of the five other Synodicals then in existence-Mrs. J. Calvin Stewart, Virginia; Mrs. Chris G. Dullnig, Texas; Mrs. W. C. Fritter, Alabama; Mrs. C. P. Crawford, Georgia, and Mrs. M. D. Irvine, Kentucky. The paper being unanimously approved by them, it was then submitted to the Synod of Missouri and received its approval. In February, an unofficial group of women representing eight Synods met in Atlanta to devise plans for promoting the publicity campaign which they decided should precede the presentation of the matter to the Assembly the following May.

In May 1912, the overture was presented to the General Assembly from the Synodical of Missouri with the approval of the five other Synodicals then existing, forty-one Presbyterial Unions, the Synod of Missouri and the Presbyteries of Columbia, Atlanta, Knoxville and Suwanee. These petitioning bodies of women agreed to ask no financial support for the new department for two years or until the organization had justified its existence. The General Assembly in session at Bristol, Tennessee, approved the overture without any discussion and no audible opposing votes. The Executive Secretaries of the four Executive Committees of the Church, who, at the request of the women, had been appointed the Supervisory Committee of the Auxiliary, were directed by the Assembly to meet the following summer with the Synodical Presidents and outline and erect the organization desired by the women.

== Establishment ==
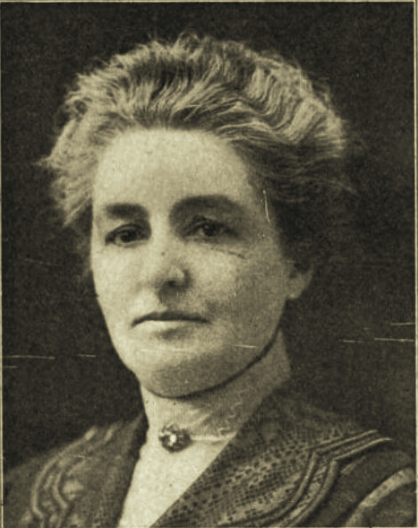
Anne L. Howison

In August 1912, the four Executive Secretaries of the Church met with the Synodical Presidents and other representative women at the Montreat retreat to outline the organization, set up the head office, and elect the Secretary. The name "The Woman's Auxiliary of the Presbyterian Church, U. S." was unanimously chosen. Winsborough was elected Superintendent of the new Woman's Auxiliary, as the title, "Executive Secretary," had been changed to that of "Superintendent" and Anne L. Howison (Mrs. A. M. Howison), of Staunton, Virginia was elected "Treasurer".

== Budget ==
At the Assembly of 1914, the Church formally acknowledged the financial value of the Woman's Auxiliary and directed the four Executive Committees to furnish its budget. Each Committee contributed to the Auxiliary Budget in the same proportion as the percentage it received of the church's budget. All the women of the Church were expected to contribute weekly through the duplex envelopes as members of the Church. The Auxiliary received no report of these gifts. Every Auxiliary had its own "over and above" budget which included gifts to all the Causes of the Church usually in the percentage recommended to the local church by the Presbytery. It also includes funds for the support and promotion of the Presbyterials and Synodicals and other departments of woman's work.

== Outline ==
The Woman's Auxiliary was formulated entirely by the women themselves. No conservative restrictions were superimposed upon them. They outlined the organization they desired and the Assembly gave its approval to the plan. When in 1923, at the Montreat Assembly, the Executive Committees were directed to add women to their membership, this important advance did not involve any change whatever in the Woman's Auxiliary, nor disturb any plan which was then in operation. The Auxiliary had been organized in the beginning as a promotional agency for the whole program of the Church, and the placing of some of its representatives on Executive Committees was only the completion of the ideal in the minds of its founders.

The Woman's Auxiliary became the only woman's organization in the church. All other existing organizations were disbanded and the Woman's Auxiliary adopted as the channel for all the activities of the women of that church. The Woman's Auxiliary had the usual officers, and in addition to these, a Secretary representing each of the following departments: Foreign Missions, Assembly's Home Missions, S. P. and C. Home Missions, Christian Education and Ministerial Relief, Sunday School Extension and Young People's Work, Spiritual Life, Christian Social Service and Literature. The entire membership of the Auxiliary was divided into groups called Circles.
