= Thomas Verner Moore (church minister) =

American minister

Thomas Verner Moore (1818-1871) was a Reformed theologian and Presbyterian minister in the Presbyterian Church in the United States (PCUS) who served as Moderator of the General Assembly of the PCUS Southern Presbyterian Church in 1867.

== Life ==
T.V. Moore was born in 1818 and became a minister in the Southern Presbyterian church. He served in Pennsylvania (1845-47), Richmond, Virginia (1847-68), and Nashville, Tennessee (1869-71). He was an author and received his D.D. in 1853.

He was the editor and a publisher of The Central Presbyterian.

The PCUS was formed by secession from the Presbyterian Church in the United States of America in 1861 as a result of the American Civil War. After the end of the civil war in 1865, Dr Moore was appointed Moderator of its General Assembly in 1867.

He died in 1871.

== Publications ==
- 1856 The Prophets of the Restoration, or, Haggai, Zechariah, and Malachi: A New Translation, with Notes. Rev. T.V. Moore, D.D. Pastor of the First Presbyterian Church, Richmond, Va. Robert Carter and Brothers, New York.
- 1858 The Last Days of Jesus; or, The appearances of our Lord during the forty days between the resurrection and the ascension. T.V. Moore, Presbyterian Board of Publication, Philadelphia.
- 1868 The corporate life of the church, preached at the opening of the General Assembly of the Presbyterian Church in the United States, in Franklin Street Church, Baltimore on 21/5/1868.
- 1868 The Culdee Church: or, The historical connection of modern Presbyterian churches with those of apostolic times, through the Church of Scotland. Presbyterian Committee of Publication, Richmond, 1868, reprinted from the Central Presbyterian.
- Harold B. Prince, 1983, pp. 227-229, entries 1452, 2345-2364, 3169, 3892 about T.V. Moore.
