= James Henley Thornwell =

American theologian

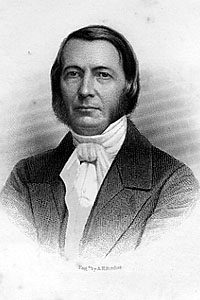
- Born: December 9, 1812
- Died: August 1, 1862 (aged 49)
- Occupation: Theologian
- Spouse: Nancy Witherspoon
- Children: 9

James Henley Thornwell (December 9, 1812 – August 1, 1862) was an American Presbyterian theologian, professor, and slaveowner from South Carolina who served as president of South Carolina College from 1851 to 1855. He became prominent in the Old School Presbyterian denomination, preaching and writing on theological and social issues. After first teaching at, then leading South Carolina College, he went on to teach at Columbia Theological Seminary.

First opposed to secession, he supported the Confederacy during the American Civil War and defended slavery. Among Thornwell's distinctive views on slavery, he preached that the black population was created in the image of God just like whites, who should call slaves their brothers. Accordingly, he promoted the Christianization of slavery and the expansion of enslavement to include low class whites.

== Early life and education ==
Thornwell was born in December 9, 1812 Marlboro County, son of James Thornwell and Martha Terrell. He had five siblings, including a twin brother who died a few weeks after birth. Their father died in 1830. Thornwell received a basic education, and his teachers testified of his intelligence and work ethic, and he received sponsorship to attend South Carolina College.

After graduating top of his class in 1829, he studied the Westminster Confession of Faith and eventually resolved to become a minister. He studied first at Andover Theological School, but, finding inadequate linguistic studies there as well as a dominance of New School thought, he moved to Harvard Divinity School, but left after finding it largely Unitarian. He returned to South Carolina and became a Presbyterian minister in 1834.

== Career ==
Thornwell returned to South Carolina College and taught logic and belles lettres from 1836 to 1838, then returned to work as a minister, now in Columbia. Again he returned to the college from 1840 to 1852.

=== Against Charles Hodge ===
In internal Presbyterian politics, he opposed the ecclesiology of Charles Hodge, who, in an 1843 Presbyterian Church in the United States of America General Assembly vote, led the church to accept that teaching elders were above ruling elders, which Thornwell saw as a path leading to "High Churchism and Popery". Thornwell would defeat Hodge in the General Assembly in 1845 with a vote against accepting the validity of Roman Catholic baptisms. He gave a two hour speech to support his position, gaining him national attention. He was able to be elected into Hodge's role as moderator in 1847. To Hodge, ecclesiology was left purposefully flexible in the Bible, while to Thornwell, the Bible provided an exact guide of polity organization. The two would continue to face off until last meeting in 1860, in which conference Thornwell's position against voluntary societies was defeated, shaking his confidence in the denomination's commitment to Biblical purity.

=== As an established churchman ===
In this period, John C. Calhoun considered him the greatest man he knew, and they were each similarly influential in the state. George Bancroft called Thornwell the "Calhoun of the church". In 1852, Thornwell became a minister in Charleston. That same year, he returned again at Columbia to serve as president of South Carolina College.

He founded the Southern Presbyterian Review in 1847 and became editor-in-chief of the Southern Quarterly Review in 1856.

Thornwell worried that secession was impossible without a civil war, and, in 1860, privately wrote in favor of gradual emancipation. However, as the Secession crisis progressed, he grew to believe the political atmosphere no longer able to accommodate his campaign to Christianize slavery. Immediately preceding South Carolinian secession, Thornwell ardently supported secession in his writings and led prayer in the first session of the South Carolinian legislative convention on secession. Upon the breakout of war, Thornwell participated in the formation of the Presbyterian Church in the Confederate States of America. The PCCSA seceded from the Presbyterian Church in the United States of America over the Gardiner Spring Resolutions, which made specific loyalty to the US Government a condition of polity and wrote the first address, "An Address to All Churches of Christ," for the new denomination.

Thornwell's reactions to the course of the Civil War in 1861 were positive, interpreting the strength of the Southern army as a sign of the favor of God.

== Personal life ==
In 1835 he married Nancy Witherspoon, daughter of Isaac Donnom Witherspoon, and had nine children with her.

== Beliefs ==
=== Ecclesiastical ===
Thornwell believed that the church's role was religious education, the administering of baptism and communion, and the disciplining of its members, rather than to promote social change. He supported the laying on of hands in ordinations and the presence of a ruling elder to reach quorum presbytery meetings. He argued that the state should assume responsibility for educating children, and that public opinion would prevent the state from teaching anti-Christian ideas.

Thornwell's Southern Presbyterian Review opposed Josiah C. Nott's Types of Mankind for its conflict with the Biblical creation narrative, with Thornwell chiding its conclusion that black people were fundamentally different in some way than white people.

=== Political ===
Thornwell believed that industrial capitalism was moving towards social anarchy. He framed the conflict between abolitionists and anti-abolitionists in grander terms:

The parties in the conflict are not merely abolitionists and slaveholders. They are atheists, socialists, communists, red republicans, Jacobins on the one side, and friends of order and regulated freedom on the other. In one word, the world is the battleground – Christianity and Atheism the combatants; and the progress of humanity at stake.

— James Henley Thornwell,

==== Slavery ====
Thornwell owned slaves. He constantly cited the Bible to argue against abolitionists that slavery was sanctioned by Biblical authority. Thornwell thought slaves should be treated with paternalistic guidance. He advocated a limited, Christianized slavery which was humane and in line with God's precepts. This was because Thornwell thought free labor left the poor in a state of misery and threatened society with revolution and upheaval. Therefore, he believed a reformed version of slavery to be a preferable alternative. Thornwell's disdain for the absolute power of slave masters and subsequent attempts to reconcile Christianity, paternalism, and slavery into a collectivistic vision of society were described by historian Stefan Roel Reyes as proto-fascist.

Despite his volume of writing on slavery, Thornwell did not acknowledge the physical abuse of slaves and focused his arguments in favor of the practice as a hierarchical familial obligation, including educational and religious obligations for masters. Nevertheless, he identified it as part of the curse of sin, believing that it would be removed upon the Second Coming. Historian William W. Freehling speculated that had Thornwell survived the war, he would have come against slavery.

Thornwell, in the words of Professor Eugene Genovese, attempted "to envision a Christian society that could reconcile – so far as possible in a world haunted by evil – the conflicting claims of a social order with social justice and both with the freedom and dignity of the individual."

Unlike capitalism or communism, which Thornwell believed altered social norms, he avowed that slavery was part of the social fabric and, therefore, unalterable.

— Jamie Diane Wilson: Transatlantic Encounters and the Origins of James Henly Thornwell's Proslavery Ideology,

== Death ==
Thornwell died in Charlotte, North Carolina on August 1, 1862, after a long struggle with tuberculosis. Thornwell is buried in Elmwood Cemetery, Columbia, South Carolina.

== Legacy ==
An administrative building at University of South Carolina is named in his honor. In July 2021, the university's Presidential Commission on University History recommended removing his name from the building.

Thornwell Orphanage, founded 1875, is named for him.

== See also ==
- Robert Lewis Dabney

== Bibliography ==
- Thornwell, James Henley. The Collected Writings of James Henley Thornwell, 4 vols. Edited by John B. Adger and John L. Girardeau, 1871–1873.
- Thornwell, James Henley. The Rights and Duties of Masters: A Sermon Preached at the Dedication of a Church Erected in Charleston, S. C., for the Benefit and Instruction of the Coloured Population (1850).
- Palmer, Benjamin (December 2008). Life and Letters of James Henley Thornwell. Applewood Books. ISBN 978-1-4290-1634-6.
- Calhoun, David B. Our Southern Zion – Old Columbia Seminary 1828–1927 published by Banner of Truth Trust, Carlisle PA 17018 USA, Copyright David B. Calhoun, 2012.
- White, Henry Alexandra. Southern Presbyterian Leaders 1683–1911 published by Banner of Truth Trust, Carlisle, PA 17018 USA, 2000. Previously published by the Neale Publishing Co., New York, 1911.

Religious titles
Preceded by The Rev. Charles Hodge	Moderator of the 59th General Assembly of the Presbyterian Church in the United States of America (Old School); 1847–1848	Succeeded by The Rev. Alexander T. McGill
