= Charles A. Spring =

American merchant and religious leader

- Born: July 25, 1800; Newburyport, Massachusetts
- Died: January 17, 1892 (aged 91)
- Spouse: Dorothy B. Norton
- Children: 6, including Charles A. Spring Jr.
- Parent: Samuel Spring Sr.
- Relatives: Gardiner Spring (brother)

Charles A. Spring (July 25, 1800 – January 17, 1892) was an American merchant and religious leader. He had a profound impact on Presbyterianism in the Northwest Territory, helping to establish at least six churches in Iowa and Illinois, and acted as a delegate in the General Assembly of 1861, which voted on the Gardiner Spring Resolutions, named after his brother Gardiner, and thus gave the assent of the Presbyterian Church to Abraham Lincoln's moves to keep the Union together.

== Early life in the East ==
Charles A. Spring was the second youngest of the children of the Rev. Samuel Spring Sr., the Revolutionary War chaplain of Benedict Arnold's army. Born in the Manse of the Congregationalist Church in Newburyport, Massachusetts on July 25, 1800, he was a descendant of Rev. Solomon Stoddard, a brother of Rev. Gardiner Spring, and a relative of Rev. Jonathan Edwards and Vice-president Aaron Burr.

After his father's death in 1819, Charles moved south to Boston, and went to work as a merchant, dealing in silk goods and textiles. In 1823, he married Dorothy B. Norton of Maine. Three of their children were born in Boston: Frances Eliza, Charles A. Spring Jr., and Winthrop Norton. Sometime before 1830, the family moved to Brooklyn, where daughters Edwina and Gertrude, as well as son George Hopkins, were born.

== Life in the Old Northwest ==
In 1837, the Springs went west as part of the Great Migration, and settled first at Rock Island, Illinois on the Mississippi River. At the time, the journey from New York to Illinois took one month, and was made by the way of the Erie Canal and then the Ohio and Mississippi Rivers.

Charles helped lay out and survey the town of Rock Island, where he settled into farming. By the 1840s, he was an elder in the Presbyterian Church in Rock Island, and was the sole layman on the committee that organized, in November 1844, the First Presbyterian Church of Sterling, Illinois. The Spring farm at Rock Island, in 1850, was spread over 100 acres, and had in the way of livestock 2 horses, 16 milch cows, 20 other cattle, and 20 swine, which produced 400 lbs of butter. The produce included 1600 bushels of Indian Corn, 100 bu. of oats, 100 of Irish potatoes, 20 of sweet potatoes, and 50 tons of hay.

By 1851, Charles Spring and family had moved to Chicago; in November of that year, his wife Dorothy died. Charles pere et fils went into the boot and shoe business under the name C. A. Spring & Sons, locating at 188 Lake St. They lived in Hyde Park for a time, but by 1855 were in West Chicago, living on Fulton between Union and Halsted. By 1858, Charles took to farming again in Manteno, just south of Chicago.

== Relationship with Cyrus McCormick and church work ==
While in Chicago, Charles Sr. became superintendent of the Sunday school at the North Presbyterian Church, and there met the inventor Cyrus Hall McCormick, whose mechanized reaper did for the Midwest what the cotton gin had done for the South. The two remained close friends and kept up an extensive correspondence until McCormick's death in 1884. Spring and McCormick established the South Church in what is now The Loop in Chicago, although they returned to the North Church when they were able to retain their favoured pastor, Rev. Dr. Nathan Rice.

During the 1850s, Charles was instrumental in the founding of what eventually became the McCormick Theological Seminary. McCormick was a conservative Democrat who had been born in Virginia, and although he was no apologist for slavery, was intent on holding together both the Old School Presbyterian Church and the Union (he considered the Presbyterian Church and the Democratic Party to be the “two hoops that hold the barrel of the Union together."

McCormick thus set his sights on securing a seminary which would advance orthodox Presybyterian doctrine. An Indiana seminary was in dire straits, and when the General Assembly met in Indianapolis in 1859 to discuss its future, McCormick, acting through Spring (who was a delegate), offered the seminary an endowment of $100,000 on the condition that the Seminary locate in Chicago and that the General Assembly take control of it from the synods. This was an offer that the General Assembly couldn't refuse, and so the Seminary found its new home in Chicago.

Charles A. Spring was also instrumental in gaining the donation of some of the land for the seminary, from the brewers Lill & Diversey. He sat on the Seminary's Board of Directors from 1859 to 1876 (when he relocated to Western Iowa). In an 1872 letter, McCormick gave his friend Spring the credit for the founding of the seminary, referring to Spring as “the most aged and experienced of us all, and to whom I was myself indebted for the original suggestion and advice to make the donation to this cause", the seminary.

In 1859, Charles guided the creation of the First Presbyterian Church of Manteno, Illinois, securing a donation from McCormick which funded nearly half of the amount necessary for the building of the church. In 1866, he gave the parsonage as a gift (it burned down soon after his death, in 1895).

In 1861, Charles was a delegate to the Presbyterian General Assembly in Philadelphia which considered the Gardiner Spring Resolutions propounded by his brother, Rev. Gardiner Spring, of New York City. The assembly finally approved the resolutions, which meant the church would stand behind Abraham Lincoln's attempts to keep the Union intact.

In 1865, Spring cared for William Sanderson McCormick, the inventor's brother and partner, during his long illness. When William died that fall, Charles A. Spring Jr. took over the management of the McCormick Co., as well as McCormick's extensive real estate holdings. The elder Spring often helped his son in this, especially during the busy spring leasing season.

Charles Sr. repeatedly tried to convince McCormick to carry out one of William's last wishes, which was to found a home for young girls (age 5–10) to save them from “destructive Parental & other influence” and to clothe, feed, and educate them in a religious environment. Charles himself had successfully petitioned the Chicago City Council to set aside funds to establish the Chicago Reform School for Boys, one of the first of its kind in the nation. According to Hutchinson, McCormick's biographer, Charles believed that “too much emphasis was placed upon punishment, and not enough upon the prevention of crime.

== Later life ==
By 1868, Charles's eyesight was failing, but he was still farming, living most of the year with his daughters Edwina and Frances and sons George and Winthrop in Manteno. As he wrote C. H. McCormick in May 1865, he spent his days “raising strawberries and grandchildren."

In 1877–1878, Charles retired and moved to Le Mars, Iowa, where his son Winthrop worked as a McCormick reaper agent, his son George owned a hardware company, and where his daughter Edwina soon married Byron Mudge, a Civil War pensioner. He lived with the Mudges for the last 15 years of his life. He stayed quite active in his old age. In 1884, at the age of 84, Charles caught a white Pacific crane on the Arkansas River which measured 6 feet and 4 inches from beak to toes. It was reported by the Le Mars Sentinel, and went on exhibition in Le Mars.

Charles A. Spring Sr., died on January 17, 1892, at the age of 91, from complications of 'la grippe' (influenza). His obituary in the Le Mars Sentinel spoke of his many passions. He was a member of the American Sunday School Union, and labored for many years for the American Tract Society, “building school houses as places of worship in different needy localities.”

== Descendants ==
Charles's eldest son, Charles A. Spring Jr., was Cyrus McCormick's most trusted adviser, and general manager of the McCormick plant for many years. His second eldest son, Winthrop, along with Winthrop's wife, daughter, and daughter-in-law, all died in the catastrophic Iroquois Theatre Fire in Chicago in 1903. His grandson, Dr. Samuel Newton Spring, was a noted forestry professor at Yale and Cornell, Dean of the New York State forestry department, and was a correspondent and friend of Franklin Delano Roosevelt. His great-great-grandson, Charles A. Spring IV, was a bridge engineer for United States Steel in Pittsburgh.
