= Divine Right's Trip =

1972 novel by Gurney Norman

- 1990 edition cover
- Author: Gurney Norman
- Cover artist: Laura Lee Cundiff
- Language: English
- Genre: Fantasy novel
- Publisher: Dial Press
- Publication date: 1972
- Publication place: United States
- Media type: Print (Paperback)
- Pages: 311 pp (paperback edition)
- ISBN: 0-917788-42-7 (paperback edition)
- OCLC: 21437165
- Dewey Decimal: 813/.54 20
- LC Class: PS3564.O57 D58 1990

Divine Right's Trip: A Novel of the Counterculture is a 1972 novel by Gurney Norman.

== Plot ==
The plot is set in the 1960s, which chronicles the awakening of the hippie stoner Divine Right (alter ego of the main character D.R. (David Ray) Davenport) as he travels from Kentucky with his girlfriend Estelle across the country, in a patient and introspective 1963 VW Bus, Urge. Divine Right has no idea where he is or where he is going.

D.R. and Estelle take turns sleeping and driving, but D.R.'s constant straddling between waking and sleeping makes the journey as much an inner trip as it is a physical seemingly random trip from Urge to anywhere. The first helper character to be encountered is the Lone Outdoorsman who is a non-moving object in this road-trip story, stuck camping on the same site for many years, watching TV in his solitude. He is a suspicious soul.

The next helper is the Greek, who is named for his talking. The Greek is on a journey back to Norman, Oklahoma, to destroy the last remaining record of himself, which is an autobiographical Master's thesis. He wants to erase himself and forget his name, and hopes to come closer to Nirvana by doing this. It seems D.R. and the Greek have a lot in common in this quest, but while the Greek is moving toward some goal, D.R. is only running away from home.

Next up is the Native, whom D.R. meets while attending a funeral for his friend Eddie. After this D.R. heads for his sister and tells Estelle he would prefer to see his sister's family without her. He is reluctant to mix his two identities; with Estelle he is D.R. and with his sister he is David Ray. This results in Estelle leaving D.R., and the story, for good. D.R. settles in at his sister Marcella and Doyle's house as if he were born there, and he finds out about a person called Emmit, his chance for salvation.

While Marcella's family is at church, D.R. gets his own message from what he perceives as God (Mrs. Godsey) over the phone. She tells him to come home and take care of Emmit. As D.R. crosses the Ohio River, the narration suddenly shifts from Divine Right's journey home to David Ray's weekend trips as a boy from Cincinnati back to the old homeplace. When we change back to Divine Right he is at a crossroads in Kentucky and so is the story: the two D.R.'s are about to converge.

D.R. struggles with his two selves as he gets closer to home. He hallucinates in the back of the van, meets a dragon with "seven horns". He perceives himself as the "monster". Even so, when he gets to Mrs. Godsey's, he exits the van as David Ray and the two identities finally converged into one after a face off in a nearby coal mine.

D.R. psychically returns home, helping his dead grandmother with the laundry and sharing tea with his Uncle Emmit. D.R. becomes a part of his Uncle Emmit, a part of his family, and a part of the hillside where he will live and where his Uncle Emmit will be buried. Emmit is planted in the ground "like a seed," and D.R. sleeps in Emmit's bed. Emmit is in the box marked "past," and D.R. is in the one marked "present." Everything seems to be in harmony, except for the fact that Estelle is missing. She returns and D.R. marries her, and the story is completed. Divine Right has found himself travelling back to his Appalachian roots.

== Background ==
Divine Right's Trip was originally printed in installments in Whole Earth Catalog in 1971.

Norman also wrote the short story collection Kinfolks: The Wilgus Stories in 1977. Both the novel and the short stories share an Appalachian background.
