= Gardiner Spring Resolutions =

Presbyterian declaration of schism

The Gardiner Spring Resolutions were adopted by the General Assembly of the Presbyterian Church in the United States of America in May 1861 and precipitated the creation of the Presbyterian Church in the Confederate States of America and the schism of the Presbyterian Church along regional lines and that lasted from the American Civil War until 1983. The resolutions were propounded by Gardiner Spring, the longtime pastor of the Brick St. Presbyterian Church in New York City, and defended by his brother, Charles A. Spring, the founder of several churches in Iowa and Illinois. The resolutions were adopted a few weeks after the Battle of Fort Sumter and gave the Presbyterian Church's assent to Abraham Lincoln's attempts to keep the Union intact in the face of Southern secession.

== Text ==
On Friday, the second day of the sessions, GARDINER SPRING, D.D., of New York Presbytery, offered a Resolution, that a Committee be appointed to inquire into the expediency of this General Assembly making some expression of their devotion to the Union of these States, and their loyalty to the Government; and if in their judgment it is expedient so to do, they report what that expression shall be.

The resolutions, as adopted, were as follows:

1. Resolved, That in view of the present agitated and unhappy condition of this country, the first day of July next be hereby set apart as a day of prayer throughout our bounds; and that on that day ministers and people are called on humbly to confess and bewail our national sins; to offer our thanks to the Father of light for his abundant and undeserved goodness to us as a nation; to seek his guidance and blessing upon our rulers and their counsels, as well as on the Congress of the United States about to assemble; and to implore Him, in the name of Jesus Christ, the great High Priest of the Christian profession, to turn away his anger from us, and speedily restore to us the blessings of an honorable peace.

2. Resolved, That this General Assembly, in the spirit of that Christian patriotism which the Scriptures enjoin, and which has always characterized this Church, do hereby acknowledge and declare our obligations to promote and perpetuate, so far as in us lies, the integrity of these United States, and to strengthen, uphold, and encourage the Federal Government in the exercise of all its functions under our noble Constitution; and to this Constitution in all its provisions, requirements, and principles, we profess our unabated loyalty.

And to avoid all misconception, the Assembly declare that by the terms "Federal Government," as here used, is not meant any particular administration, or the peculiar opinions of any particular party, but that central administration, which being at any time appointed and inaugurated according to the forms prescribed in the Constitution of the United States, is the visible representative of our national existence.
