= Samuel Spring =

American clergyman (1746–1819)

- Born: February 27, 1746; Uxbridge, Massachusetts
- Died: March 4, 1819 (aged 73); Newburyport, Massachusetts
- Occupation: Minister
- Spouse: Hannah Hopkins
- Children: 11 children including Gardiner Spring and Charles A. Spring

Rev. Samuel Spring (1746–1819) was an early American Revolutionary War chaplain and Congregationalist minister.

== Early life and education ==
Spring was born in Uxbridge in the Massachusetts Colony on February 27, 1746. His father was John Spring (1706–1794), a militia man and local wealthy farmer, and his mother was Sarah Read (1716–1800). He was a great-great-grandson of John Spring, a Founder and early settler of Watertown, Massachusetts, who travelled to America under the patronage of his cousin Sir William Spring, 1st Baronet, and was the great-grandson of John Spring of Lavenham and the great-great-grandson of Thomas Spring of Lavenham. John later commanded the company of militia from Uxbridge in the American Revolution. His father was the town's moderator, selectman, and surveyor of highways, but lacked even a rudimentary education. Sarah, Samuel's mother, remained determined that he would have the best education possible.

Spring studied under the Rev. Nathan Webb, founding pastor of the first Congregational church begun in the First Great Awakening period of the Massachusetts Colony. Webb's early training of Spring helped prepare him to enter New Jersey College (now Princeton University), where he graduated in 1771. He took advanced theological studies from Samuel Hopkins of Newport, Rhode Island. His former mentor, Rev. Webb died in 1772. Spring was licensed as a minister in 1774 on the eve of the American Revolution. Aaron Burr was one of his classmates in Theological Studies at Princeton, who went on to study law.

== Revolutionary War service ==
When the Revolution's stirrings began, the Provincial Congress required the militia to have chaplains. Spring took up his colony's call. He served in both the Siege of Boston and in the invasion of Canada. He initially served in the regiment commanded by Colonel John Fellows of Sheffield. Burr also served at the Siege of Boston. When Colonel Benedict Arnold convinced General George Washington to open a second front against the British in Canada, Spring and Burr both joined this force under Colonel Benedict Arnold. Ships sailed from Newburyport, Massachusetts to Maine. At Fort Western, near what is now Augusta, Maine, Spring counseled Private James McCormick, who was sentenced to death, only to be reprieved.

The trip through Maine left a tattered, very ill army to invade Quebec. French Canadians helped the Americans with supplies and clothing. At Quebec Senter took possession of the Hôtel-Dieu on the banks of the St. Charles River. Spring converted the hotel to a hospital and chapel. Benedict Arnold's leg was shattered in the siege of Quebec, during the ill-fated New Year's Eve assault on the fortress city walls. Spring carried Benedict Arnold from the battlefield to the Hotel Dieu (the hospital). American troops occupied Montreal and Trois-Rivières and maintained the Siege on Quebec. Colonel John Patterson's regiment was dispatched to Quebec to shore up American positions. The American troops retreated to the Lake Champlain area at Mt. Independence. Regrouped soldiers heard Spring's sermon on November 3, 1776, at this encampment. Chaplain Spring was discharged from the Continental Army at the end of 1776.

== Marriage and later work ==
Reverend Spring returned to Newburyport and married Hannah, daughter of Rev. Samuel Hopkins of Hadley, Massachusetts, on November 4, 1779. He was a founder of the Massachusetts Missionary Society in 1779 and of the Andover Theological Seminary in 1808. He was very influential in a fundamentalist wing of the Congregational Church and many of his sermons and discourses were printed and widely disseminated. John Quincy Adams was one of many who disagreed with Spring's teachings; Adams wrote that Spring's views were "extremely contracted and illiberal" and that he had the "enthusiasm of a bigot". Spring maintained contacts with Uxbridge.

He and his wife had 11 children, although several died young:

1. Margaret Stoddard Spring was born April 26, 1783. In August 1807 she married Bezaleel Taft, Jr., a politician from Uxbridge. She died on July 25, 1816, and her widower married her cousin Hannah Spring.
2. Rev. Dr. Gardiner Spring was born February 24, 1785, and became an influential minister in his own right.
3. Hannah Spring was born September 6, 1788, and died March 16, 1796.
4. Walton Spring was born September 15, 1790, and died May 8, 1809.
5. Rev. Dr. Samuel Spring Jr. (March 9, 1792 – December 13, 1877), graduated from Yale University in 1811, married Lydia Maria Norton, and had 9 children.
6. Lewis Spring was born October 20, 1793, and was lost at sea in 1815.
7. Mary Spring was born November 12, 1795, and died August 30, 1796.
8. Pickney Spring was born July 19, 1798, and died in 1820.
9. Charles A. Spring was born July 25, 1800, and married Dorothy B. Norton. He became an influential figure in Presbyterianism in Illinois and Iowa.
10. Captain John Hopkins Spring was born September 21, 1802, married Sarah Ann Rand, and had 6 children.

Samuel Spring died March 4, 1819, in Newburyport.

== Works ==
- Sermon to the Massachusetts Missionary Society 1802
- Moral Disquisitions 1815
