= John Girardeau =

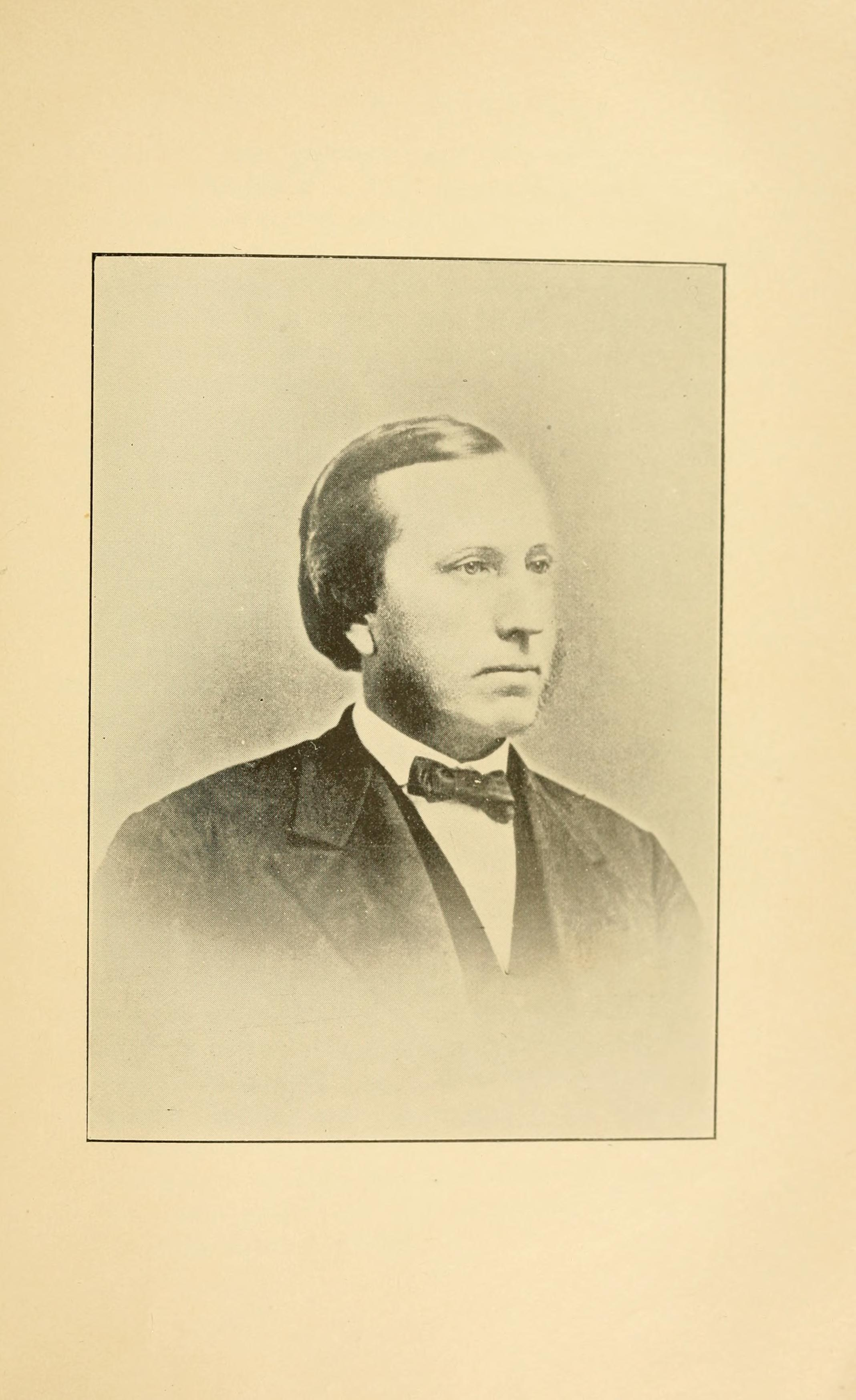

John Lafayette Girardeau (14 November 1825 – 23 June 1898) was a Reformed theologian and minister in the Presbyterian Church in the United States. He is notable as a Calvinist defender of libertarianism, the teaching that Adam, as the representative man, could have chosen between alternatives, and that he could have chosen differently in the pre-fall state, rather than a determinist or compatibilist view.

He was a professor of systematic theology at Columbia Theological Seminary in South Carolina.

== Writings / Bibliography ==
- C.N. Willborn - Who Was John Lafayette Girardeau?
- Calvinism and Evangelical Arminianism (1890)
- Discussions of Philosophical Questions (1900)
- Instrumental Music in the Public Worship of the Church (1888)
- Sermons on Important Subjects: Edited by George Blackstone (1907)
- The Will in its Theological Relations (1891)
- Sermons on Important Subjects: Edited by George Blackstone (1907)
- Misc. Writings / Log College
