= Presbyterian Church in the United States =

1861–1983 Christian denomination

Presbyterian Church in the United States
- Classification: Protestant
- Orientation: Calvinist
- Polity: Presbyterian polity
- Origin: 1861
- Separated from: Presbyterian Church in the United States of America (1861)
- Absorbed: Independent Presbyterian Church (1863); United Synod of the South (1864); parts of the Associate Reformed Church (1867,1870)
- Separations: Presbyterian Church in America (1973)
- Merged into: Presbyterian Church (USA), 1983
- Congregations: 4,250 in 1982
- Members: 814,931 in 1982
- Ministers: 6,077 in 1982

The Presbyterian Church in the United States (PCUS, originally Presbyterian Church in the Confederate States of America) was a Protestant denomination in the Southern and border states of the United States that existed from 1861 to 1983. That year, it merged with the United Presbyterian Church in the United States of America (UPCUSA) to form the Presbyterian Church (USA).

== History ==
=== Organization (1861) ===
The Presbyterian Church in the United States grew out of regional and theological divisions within the Presbyterian Church in the United States of America (PCUSA), the first national Presbyterian denomination in the U.S., founded in 1789. In 1838, the PCUSA divided along theological lines due to the Old School–New School Controversy. The New School faction advocated revivalism and a softening of traditional Calvinism, while the Old School was opposed to the extremes of revivalism and desired strict conformity to the Westminster Confession, the Presbyterian Church's doctrinal standard. Many New School Presbyterians were also supportive of moral reform movements, such as abolitionism.

As a result, after 1838 most Southern Presbyterians aligned with the Old School Presbyterian Church. The reluctance of the Old School General Assembly to rule on moral and political questions not explicitly addressed in the Bible resulted in the Northern and Southern sections of the Old School Presbyterian Church staying united longer than their New School counterparts. The latter split over slavery in 1858. New School synods and presbyteries in the South established the pro-slavery United Synod of the South.

Old School Presbyterians remained united until after the start of hostilities in the American Civil War. In May 1861, the Old School General Assembly passed the controversial Gardiner Spring Resolutions that called on Presbyterians to support the Federal Government of the United States as a religious duty. Southerners, with support from a minority of Northerners, protested that this action violated the spirituality of the church and required Southerners to commit treason against their home states in order to remain members of the church.

After the May meeting of the General Assembly, some presbyteries in the South immediately renounced the jurisdiction of the General Assembly. On August 15, a convention in Atlanta, Georgia, representing 17 presbyteries, encouraged all presbyteries who had not done so to renounce the General Assembly's jurisdiction. It also recommended that the constitution of the church remain unchanged, with the exception of replacing the phrase "Presbyterian Church in the United States of America" with the name "Presbyterian Church in the Confederate States of America". A general assembly was scheduled to meet in Augusta, Georgia, on December 4, and by that time 47 presbyteries and 10 synods had severed ties to PCUSA. The first General Assembly of the Southern Presbyterian Church accepted the recommendations of the convention and elected Benjamin M. Palmer its first moderator.

=== Postwar years (1865–1900) ===
After the Confederacy's defeat, the church renamed itself as the "Presbyterian Church in the United States". The denomination grew during its early years in part due to the absorption of a number of smaller Presbyterian groups. In 1864, the church re-united with Southern New School Presbyterians when it merged with the United Synod of the South. Between 1867 and 1874, the church welcomed the Patapsco Presbytery of Maryland, the Kentucky Synod, and the Missouri Synod after those jurisdictions withdrew from the Old School PCUSA in protest over political actions taken by that denomination. Between 1867 and 1870, the church absorbed the Alabama and Kentucky Presbyteries of the Associate Reformed Church, a denomination with roots in the Covenanter and Seceder traditions of Scottish Presbyterianism. These and other mergers added over 35,000 members and 490 local churches.

In the 1880s, the PCUS endured a prolonged battle over Darwinian evolution. James Woodrow, professor at Columbia Theological Seminary, sparked controversy when he suggested that evolutionary thought did not contradict the biblical teachings on creation. In response, the Synod of South Carolina, in which the seminary was located, prohibited the teaching of evolution in 1884. Similar actions were taken by the synods of Georgia, South Georgia, Alabama, and Florida. Columbia's board of directors was reorganized, and it voted to fire Woodrow. He refused to vacate his position and appealed to Augusta Presbytery, which exonerated him of any heresy in August 1886. This decision was appealed to the General Assembly, which after five days of debate ordered Woodrow's removal from his professorship. Despite his removal, Woodrow continued to be considered a member in good standing of the PCUS and was elected moderator of the South Carolina Synod in 1901. Nevertheless, the overwhelming sentiment of the PCUS was that evolutionary theory was a threat to Christian orthodoxy. As a result, Southern Presbyterians would disengage from scientific developments for more than a generation.

=== Later history ===
After the war, the PCUS retained its "Old School" Presbyterian emphasis until the 20th century. The PCUS leaders began to emphasize that they needed to change in light of the changing South, which was undergoing urbanization and industrialization.

The Woman's Auxiliary of the Presbyterian Church, U.S. was established in 1912, uniting various PCUS women's groups into one organization.

A point of contention were talks of merger between the mainline "Northern Presbyterians", the Presbyterian Church in the U.S.A. and its successor denomination, the United Presbyterian Church in the U.S.A. A vote for merger had come up in 1954, and despite popular support among many, the vote to merge failed. The two denominations did collaborate on a joint hymnal. The PCUS also joined the Episcopalians, United Methodists, the United Church of Christ and the UPCUSA in the Consultation on Church Union in 1962, a group begun by UPCUSA stated clerk Eugene Carson Blake. Eventually, by 1968, union churches and presbyteries were formed (that is, members of both the UPCUSA and the PCUS), and in 1970, a "Plan of Union" was drawn up. Union did not take place for another thirteen years.

Another important event occurred in 1965, when Rachel Henderlite became the first woman ordained in the Presbyterian Church in the United States; she was ordained by the Hanover Presbytery in Virginia.

The response to the civil rights movement in effect split the PCUS into three factions: a liberal group desiring full endorsement of the movement's platform, a moderate faction desiring church-wide consensus before taking positive action, and a conservative/traditionalist group vigorously opposing what it believed was the meddling of the church in the civil and cultural traditions of its native region. Conservatives argued that church activity on behalf of racial desegregation and voting rights constituted a violation of the doctrine of "the spirituality of the church", a principle developed by 19th-century Presbyterian theologian James Henley Thornwell. He had declared that social reform and political participation were duties or pursuits to be taken up by individuals, not church courts. The conservative group strongly defended that teaching, but the liberal critics believed the doctrine was a justification for maintaining racial segregation and preserving the social standing of historic upper-class white elites within Southern society, a fair percentage of whom were PCUS members.

Having been eventually defeated numerous times in the General Assembly by a coalition of the liberals and moderates from the 1960s onward, some PCUS conservatives, primarily from non-metropolitan parts of the Deep South, founded what today is the Presbyterian Church in America (PCA) in late 1973. They cited its rationale as "[a] long-developing theological liberalism which denied the deity of Jesus Christ and the inerrancy and authority of Scripture" on the part of PCUS leaders. Some evangelicals, however, remained in the PCUS in order to contend for their beliefs; this group was more willing to perceive common cause with UPCUSA conservatives. By the 2000s, some churches from both lines began to depart from the post-merger denomination over similar concerns and moral disputes, namely in favor of the Evangelical Presbyterian Church.

After the conservatives left the PCUS mainly for the PCA, but a minority for the EPC, it became easier for the remainder to work on union with the UPCUSA. Eventually, in 1983, the "Plan of Union" came up to a vote, with 53 PCUS presbyteries voting in favor of union, and 8 in opposition. On June 10, 1983, the reunion between the "northern" and "southern" Presbyterians was celebrated in Atlanta with the new denomination taking the name of the "Presbyterian Church (U.S.A.)".

== Beliefs and practices ==
Membership by year, 1960-1981
Year	Members	±%
1960	899,116	—
1961	913,582	+1.6%
1962	924,104	+1.2%
1963	933,534	+1.0%
1964	940,634	+0.8%
1965	945,974	+0.6%
1966	951,182	+0.6%
1967	956,486	+0.6%
1968	957,430	+0.1%
1969	953,174	−0.4%
1970	953,600	+0.0%
1971	945,074	−0.9%
1972	946,536	+0.2%
1973	906,359	−4.2%
1974	891,111	−1.7%
1975	878,126	−1.5%
1976	877,664	−0.1%
1977	869,693	−0.9%
1978	862,416	−0.8%
1979	852,711	−1.1%
1980	838,458	−1.7%
1981	823,143	−1.8%
1982	814,931	−1.0%

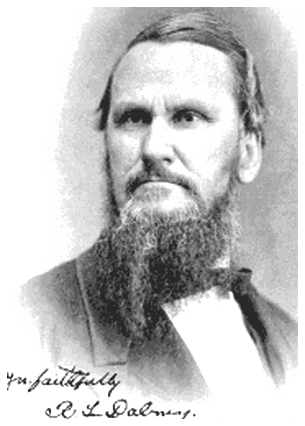
R.L. Dabney (1820-1898), a Confederate veteran, became an influential theologian in the PCUS.

The PCUS was one of the more conservative bodies of Presbyterianism throughout most of its history, with a strong emphasis on subscription to the Westminster Confession and interest in Calvinist scholasticism, particularly as expressed in Common Sense Realism and later the Princeton Theology. In fact, as their northern counterparts in Presbyterian Church in the U.S.A. began to modify Calvinism, and experiment with confessional revision, in the later part of the 19th and into the early 20th centuries, the PCUS prided itself in being the bastion of "Old School" Presbyterianism, stoutly resisting calls for change to accommodate liberalizing sensibilities. However, in the immediate years after World War II, many ministers and churches, especially in larger cities, began to embrace, or at least tolerate, modernist and neo-orthodox understandings of doctrine and church life.

One important product of this liberalization was ecumenism, expressed in merger talks with the "northern" Presbyterian Church, known as the United Presbyterian Church in the United States of America after 1958 (despite the common reference as "northern", the UPCUSA had congregations in all 50 states by the 20th century, with most of its southern churches the result of a 1906 merger with most of the Cumberland Presbyterian Church or the affiliation of African-American churches in the South Atlantic states after the Civil War). In 1946, with cooperation of three other denominations, it formed the United Andean Indian Mission, an agency that sent missionaries to Ecuador. Among some of the other liberalizing trends were the ordination of women in 1964, the ratification of a pro-choice position on abortion by the General Assembly, and the rejection by that assembly of the plenary verbal inspiration of the Bible, considered by conservatives as a touchstone dogma.

Beginning in 1942, in response to liberal trends in the PCUS, conservative churchmen such as L. Nelson Bell, longtime medical missionary to China and father-in-law of evangelist Billy Graham, began establishing various periodicals and renewal parachurch organizations for conservative clergy and laymen alike. In 1966, conservatives founded Reformed Theological Seminary in Jackson, Mississippi. Eventually, in December 1973, prompted both by liberalism, and a proposed "Plan of Union" between the UPCUSA and the PCUS which reportedly had not included an escape clause for congregations that had no desire of being part of the planned denomination, delegates from 260 churches met in Birmingham, Alabama to form the National Presbyterian Church, which would later be renamed the Presbyterian Church in America in 1974.

Following the departure of more conservative PCUS members into the PCA, the PCUS drafted a "Declaration of Faith", which paralleled the social concerns expressed in the UPCUSA's Confession of 1967. While it was approved by the General Assembly of 1976, it failed to receive a requisite supermajority of the presbyteries (largely due to opposition states where loyalist conservatives remained), and the 1977 General Assembly instead approved it for study purposes, without binding authority. That issue became moot upon the 1983 merger, as the Confession of 1967 was retained in the new denomination's Book of Confessions.

== Notable members ==
- L. Nelson Bell (father-in-law of Billy Graham)
- Reverend Bob Childress, Appalachian pastor
- Robert Lewis Dabney
- Samuel T. Francis, American columnist
- John L. Girardeau
- Thomas Verner Moore
- J. Rodman Williams
- Joseph R. Wilson (Woodrow Wilson's father) - a founder of PCUS and its first permanent stated clerk
- Benjamin Morgan Palmer
- James Henley Thornwell
- J. Vernon McGee
- D. James Kennedy
- Hallie Paxson Winsborough

== See also ==
- List of moderators of the General Assembly of the Presbyterian Church in the United States
- American Southern Presbyterian Mission
