= Escape from Hell =

Escape from Hell may refer to:

- Escape from Hell (novel), a 2009 novel by Larry Niven and Jerry Pournelle
- Escape from Hell!, a novella by Hal Duncan
- Escape from Hell (1928 film), a 1928 German silent drama film
- Escape from Hell (1980 film), a women-in-prison film
- Escape from Hell (2000 film), a Christian film
- Escape from Hell (game), 1990 game by Electronic Arts
