= Road to Redemption (2001 film) =

2001 film by Robert Vernon

- Promotional poster
- Directed by: Robert Vernon
- Written by: Robert Vernon
- Produced by: John Shepherd; John Schmidt; Dave Ross; Gordon Druvenga; Rick Garside, line producer Jason Behrman, associate producer
- Starring: Pat Hingle; Julie Condra; Leo Rossi; Jay Underwood; Tony Longo; Wes Studi
- Cinematography: Michael Balog
- Edited by: John Schmidt; John Pipes
- Music by: John Campbell
- Production companies: World Wide Pictures; Billy Graham Evangelistic Association
- Distributed by: World Wide Pictures
- Release dates: February 16, 2001 (Minneapolis, Phoenix, San Antonio, Austin, Norfolk, Seattle, Nashville, Portland); March 9, 2001 (San Diego, Cincinnati, Denver, Dallas, Kansas City, Tampa)
- Running time: 85 minutes
- Country: United States
- Language: English
- Budget: $2.2 million
- Box office: $236,823

Road to Redemption is a film produced by John Shepherd and Jason Behrman, and distributed by Billy Graham Ministries' World Wide Pictures and released in select theaters in 2001. It was written and directed by Robert Vernon and starred Pat Hingle, Jay Underwood, Julie Condra, and Leo Rossi. It was released on home video and DVD in June 2001.

== Plot ==
Amanda Tucker and her live-in boyfriend Alan Fischer steal $250,000 from Sully Santoro, a Las Vegas mob boss who also happens to be Amanda's employer. They bet the money at the races, and subsequently lose it all. While Alan decides to set Sully's office on fire to explain the missing money, Amanda decides to visit her Grandpa Nathan in Flagstaff, Arizona. He happens to be wealthy.

Unfortunately for Amanda, he's also recently found Jesus, and though he agrees to give her the money, he tacks on a caveat: she has to drive him to his favorite fishing hole. Nathan's favorite place to fish is Lake Redemption, Montana. She agrees. The pair load up her VW Beetle and embark on a road trip. Along the way, they're pursued by her boss's thugs, they encounter a rattlesnake and a grizzly bear, they follow a truck full of feathers, and they regularly pray for miracles.

During their cross-country adventure, Nathan plays evangelical broadcasts on the radio that include Billy Graham's "Day of Decision", and regularly discusses his spirituality in an attempt to convert Amanda to Christianity. Eventually, it appears to work.

== Cast ==
- Pat Hingle as Nathan Tucker
- Julie Condra as Amanda Tucker
- Leo Rossi as Sully Santoro
- Jay Underwood as Alan Fischer
- Tony Longo as Vincent the Enforcer
- Wes Studi as Frank Lightfoot
- Johnny Meyer

== Production ==
Filmed on location in California and Utah, production was completed on the film in 2000. Songs for the film were provided by the Christian music group River, who renamed their album My Life Message to Road to Redemption in order to match the film.

World Wide gave the film a budget of $2.2 million. The film made only $236,823 in box office sales.

== Release ==
Road to Redemption was screened in February 2001. The film was released in two waves to select theaters in the U.S. only: on February 16 (Minneapolis, Phoenix, San Antonio, Austin, Norfolk, Seattle, Nashville, Portland) and March 9 (San Diego, Cincinnati, Denver, Dallas, Kansas City, Tampa). After it had played in select theaters, the film was screened at local churches, both before and after the DVD home video release on June 1, 2001. Prior to the home video release, the film was included alongside other Christian offerings such as The Bibleman Adventure and Escape From Hell, in a free festival that toured several cities, including Toronto, Memphis, and Orlando.

The film began airing on U.S. television the first week of June 2001 and continued to air on U.S. television through November 2002. It played in the U.K. on television in March 2002 and still aired in January 2003.

World Wide stated that the use of select theaters for Road to Redemption was a strategic decision to determine the viability of a national theatrical release.

Road to Redemption was re-released on DVD in 2006 as part of the "Billy Graham Presents" collection of three films.

== Reception ==
Reviews for the film seem to be fairly split between Evangelical audiences and those who aren't strictly Evangelical Christians.

=== Evangelical reviews ===
Bob Waliszewski, writing for Focus on the Family's PluggedIn, focused his review on the Christian aspects of the film. He contrasts Amanda's and Nathan's lives, pointing out Nathan's comments to Amanda about true treasure being in heaven whenever Amanda mentions her very real financial situation. Waliszewski's review is also broken down into various objections Evangelicals would have with the content. For example, Alan and Amanda are not married, but live together. Alan, at one point, peeks into a women's bathroom in an attempt to find Amanda. Vincent is physically violent with Alan - and so is Grandpa Nathan. There are other scenes involving violence or near-violence. Waliszewski summed up his review by saying that the film provides "one of the wittiest, smartest, most-colorful scripts to come out of the Christian community in a long, long time."

Ken James, writing for ChristianAnswers.net, gave the film 4 out of 5 stars, and rated it as 'morally excellent'. While he too focused on the film's Christian themes - notably claiming that Amanda's redemption was fulfilling to watch, he also stated that the movie shows "technical achievement". James also lamented that the "secular world" had already decided the film fell into the category of "propagandistic evangelical" fare. Heidi Bortel, writing for The Register-Herald, stated that the film's main message is that "it's never too late to start life over" regardless of the gravity or shame one feels for one's mistakes.

MovieGuide described the film as a "fast-paced comedy with wholesome values", giving a rating of 3 out of 4 stars. The reviewer found the film entertaining and felt the message conveyed was both serious and relevant.

=== Critical response ===
Margaret A. McGurk, writing for The Cincinnati Enquirer, gave the film 2.5 out of 4 stars. Pointing out that humor is a new genre for Christian films of the time, McGurk also notes that most of the comedy within the film is slapstick in nature and that the jokes otherwise under-perform. She also found the production to be more in line with a telefilm than a piece distributed in theaters in both appearance and sound quality. Of the cast, McGurk found everyone except for Hingle to be playing cartoonish or stock characters.

Scott Foundas, writing for Variety, found the entire plot implausible but the contrivance is entirely as expected in a film made with the sole purpose of proselytizing. Foundas described the ideas put forward by Vernon's script as "curiously old-fashioned" and that the biggest mistake of the film is putting forward dogma intentionally rather than developing it dramatically. He also comments on the characters, which he calls "one-dimensional", and says that the performances are "undistinguished" except for Hingle. Foundas does acknowledge the technical skill employed in the production, specifically with camera use which he compares favorably to World Wide's previous cameraman, James F. Collier.

Kathy Cano-Murillo, writing for The Arizona Republic, also commented on the low quality of the production given the venue. She stated that had this been presented as a telefilm, it would have easily received praise for the performances given and the positive messaging, calling it "an extended version of Touched by an Angel". Cano-Murillo found the discussions between Amanda and Nathan to be cliché and noted that the preaching was a detractor from the film's departure from typical gangster comedy movies. She gave the film 2 out of 5 stars.

Rasmi Simhan, writing for The Kansas City Star, gave the film a 1 out of 4 star rating. The film's biggest flaws in Simhan's view don't center on its incorporation of religion, but rather on things that are typically a movie's downfall: uninspired characters, clichés, and "unbelievable happy endings". Regarding the characters specifically, Simhan found them unrelatable and unsympathetic. But Simhan also took issue with the fact that the film didn't address religious issues that would have given it a deeper meaning, such as the necessity of having faith in a world of "cruelty and injustice".

Marc Savlov, writing for The Austin Chronicle, rated the film 0.5 out of 5 stars. Despite praising the production for being better than many "church-financed films", Savlov described the storyline as unremarkable and plain. His only compliments to the movie were the camera movement, the pacing, and Hingle's performance.
