= World Wide Pictures =

American film company

- Type: Film production and distribution
- Founded: 1951
- Founder: Billy Graham and Dick Ross
- Defunct: 2003
- Headquarters: Minneapolis, United States
- Website: World Wide Pictures

World Wide Pictures (WWP) was a film distributor and production company established as a subsidiary of the Billy Graham Evangelistic Association (BGEA) in 1951. It is involved in the production and distribution of evangelistic films, the production of Graham crusade films, and publicity for Graham crusades.

== History ==
WWP was established in 1951 after Graham met Dick Ross, who had produced a documentary film of Graham's 1950 crusade in Portland, Oregon. That film's success led the BGEA to buy Ross's production company and hire him as the president of a new BGEA subsidiary incorporated as the Billy Graham Evangelistic Film Ministry (which was to be WWP's official name until 1980).

WWP's first feature film was Mr. Texas, produced during Graham's 1951 Fort Worth, Texas Crusade. It was also during the 1950s that WWP established production facilities in Burbank, California.

Perhaps WWP's best-known production was the 1965 film The Restless Ones, featuring Kim Darby. It was the first theatrical movie. According to an October 14, 1966, issue of Christianity Today more than 120,000 professions of faith were recorded after more than two million people viewed the film. Other feature films included Two a Penny (also 1965), which starred Cliff Richard. Both The Hiding Place (1975, with Julie Harris) and Time to Run (1973) received Golden Globe nominations for Most Promising Newcomer.

WWP stopped national releases of its films in the late 1980s. The company sold its Burbank studio, moved its headquarters to Minneapolis, and switched to working with independent producers and distributing films to churches, on home video, and as made-for-TV movies.

They cautiously returned to feature films in 2001 with the limited national release of Road to Redemption, WWP's first comedy after over 125 films. The film starred Pat Hingle, Julie Condra, Leo Rossi, Jay Underwood, Tony Longo, and Wes Studi. It was followed by The Climb, which starred Jason Winston George, Ned Vaughn, and Dabney Coleman, and featured Todd Bridges. In 2003, the company released Last Flight Out.

== See also ==
- Man in the 5th Dimension
