= David Aikman =

American writer

David Aikman (born 1944) is an American author, journalist, and foreign policy consultant.

== Life ==
Aikman graduated from Oxford University's Worcester College in 1965 and gained a PhD from the University of Washington in Russian and Chinese history in 1979.

He worked as a journalist for Time magazine from 1971 to 1994, during which he reported on nearly all the major historical events of the time. He has interviewed several major world figures, including Mother Teresa, Manuel Noriega, Aleksandr Solzhenitsyn, Pham Van Dong, Boris Yeltsin and Billy Graham.

Aikman served as a professor of history at Patrick Henry College from 2005 to 2015. He is also a senior fellow at The Trinity Forum.

In 2002 Aikman presented a pro-creationist film called Raging Waters: Evidence of the Genesis Flood in Australia, which was produced by Ken Ham's Answers in Genesis.

In 2018 Aikman was hired as editor-in-chief of Godspeed magazine.

== Bibliography ==
- Love China Today (Tyndale House, 1978), editor and co-author
- Pacific Rim: Area of Change, Area of Opportunity (Little, Brown and Company, 1986)
- Gorbachev: An Intimate Biography (New American Library, 1988), Co-author
- Massacre in Beijing: China's Struggle for Democracy (Warner Books, 1989), Co-author
- Berlin: Portrait of a City (Bullfinch Press, 1990), author of Introduction to photos by Stephane Duroy
- When the Almond Tree Blossoms (Word Publishing, 1993)
- Hope: The Heart's Great Quest (Servant Publications, September 1995)
- Great Souls: Six Who Changed The Century (Word Publishing, March 1998; paperback, Lexington Books, 2002)
- Jesus in Beijing (Regnery Publishing, October 2003)
- A Man of Faith: The Spiritual Journey of George W. Bush (W Publishing Group, April 2004)
- QI (Broadman & Holman Publishers, October 2005)
- The Delusion of Disbelief (Tyndale House Publishers, April 2008)
- The Mirage of Peace: Understanding the Never-Ending Conflict in the Middle East (Regal Books, August 2009)

== Filmography ==
- Raging Waters: Evidence of the Genesis Flood in Australia

== See also ==
- Christianity in China
