= Man in the 5th Dimension =

- Publicity poster art
- Directed by: Dick Ross
- Produced by: Dick Ross
- Starring: Billy Graham
- Narrated by: Billy Graham
- Cinematography: Ralph Woolsey
- Edited by: Irving Berlin
- Music by: Ralph Carmichael
- Distributed by: World Wide Pictures
- Release date: April 1, 1964 (U.S.)
- Running time: 28 minutes
- Country: United States
- Language: English

Man in the 5th Dimension is a 1964 American short film produced and directed by Dick Ross and starring evangelist Billy Graham. It was produced for exhibition at the 1964 New York World's Fair.

== Plot ==
Man in the 5th Dimension opens with Graham delivering this prologue: "You are about to embark on a breathtaking journey through the four-dimensional world of space and time, into the realm of the fifth dimension – the dimension of the spirit."

The film shows scenes of the universe taken from the Palomar Observatory and then travels across the world to settings of natural and man-made grandeur including the California redwoods, the Acropolis in Athens, Greece, and the United States Capitol in Washington, D.C. Throughout the film, Graham speaks of the spiritual nature of man in the midst of God's glory, and the film concludes with Graham inviting his audience to join him in accepting Jesus Christ as their savior.

== Release ==
Man in the 5th Dimension was filmed in the 70mm Todd-AO widescreen process for exclusive presentation at the Billy Graham Pavilion during the 1964 New York World's Fair. The film was presented 12 times a day, seven days a week, with free admission. The theater was equipped with audio equipment that enabled viewers to listen to the film in Chinese, French, German, Japanese, Russian and Spanish.

The film concludes with Graham making an on-screen appeal directly to his viewers to meet with counselors from his ministry who were stationed at the pavilion. "You could make this commitment at this moment, right here in this pavilion," he said in the film, speaking directly to the camera. "I'm asking you to do it now. Here is how I shall ask you to do it. I want you to meet with one of us in the counseling room, just behind the screen. We will only keep you a few minutes. We would like to give you some literature and have prayer with you. Staff members trained to help you make this all important decision are in the counseling room."

World Wide Pictures, Graham's film ministry, went through 11 Todd-AO prints; none exist today. The film was re-edited and released in 16mm. An LP based on the film’s soundtrack on the RCA Camden label was also issued. Although there has been no official home release of Man in the 5th Dimension, the movie is available to watch from the Billy Graham Evangelistic Association website.
