= Escape from Hell (video game) =

1990 video game

- Developer: Electronic Arts
- Publisher: Electronic Arts
- Producers: Dave Albert and Chris Wilson
- Designer: Richard L. Seaborne
- Programmer: Richard L. Seaborne
- Artist: Alan J. Murphy
- Platform: MS-DOS
- Release: 1990
- Genre: Role-playing
- Mode: Single-player

Escape from Hell is an open world role-playing video game developed and published by Electronic Arts in 1990 for MS-DOS.

== Gameplay ==
Starting location

The game is played from a top-down perspective. The player controls the protagonist Richard and can recruit up to two party members and gain a variety of items in the inventory. Combat is turn-based. Various tridents can be found that change the landscape of Hell, such as modifying the terrain or reducing the technology level so that firearms are ineffective.

The game is available in CGA, EGA, and VGA graphics modes.

== Plot ==
After a long day, Richard is with his girlfriend Alison who asks him about his meeting with Alan (both Richard and Alan are named after the game creators). Richard says that he couldn't find Alan and just found a strange note. When he reads it aloud, Alison is sent to Hell. He then receives a phone call from the "Divine Phone Company" reprimanding him for casting a powerful incantation. Believing it's a prank, Richard repeats what he said and is sent to Hell himself.

Richard's goal is to search Hell for Alison and return to Earth. During the journey, he finds allies among powerful rogue demons, historical figures such as Josef Stalin and Genghis Khan, and fictional characters such as Prince Hamlet.

== Development ==
Following the release of Prophecy: The Fall of Trinadon, Richard L. Seaborne pitched the concept of Escape from Hell to Electronic Arts. During development, the game shifted from being a serious traditional roleplaying game to a contemporary black comedy roleplaying game. Inspirations included the epic poem Inferno by Dante Alighieri, the novel Inferno by Larry Niven and Jerry Pournelle, the comic Stig's Inferno, and the films Beetlejuice and Bill & Ted’s Excellent Adventure.

The game was refined with the aid of EA leadership Trip Hawkins, Bing Gordon, and Dave Albert. The first six months of the total 12-month development cycle was in pre-production with developing an engine. While the gameplay and art style was similar to Wasteland, the engine code was written from the ground up and did not share any code from that game.

Because Electronic Arts wanted to ship the game on both 5¼” and 3½” floppy disks, the planned scope of the game was reduced. Nine levels of Hell were originally planned (following the description of Hell in Dante's Inferno), but were reduced to three. Additional planned character and monster art was removed as well as ways for the world to change over time and based on character actions. Multiple endings were planned, such as Richard choosing to rescue a woman he met in Hell rather than Alison.

== Reception ==
The Games Machine rated the game 78% saying "although Escape from Hell is nothing to shout about, it can still be recommended as it exhibits a fair sprinkling of puzzles and some nice design touches wilh an interesting scenario." PC Leisure (June 1990) rated the game 80%. The New Straits Times wrote "This ageing game is considered to be one of the best in its genre, and the solution given by [the contributor] proves that there are people out there who appreciate the quality of games like this."

The box art included the text "WARNING: Contains nudity, violence and controversial images." This was added to avoid potential consumer backlash and to encourage curiosity in the game. However, a number of retailers and international regions chose not to sell the game and it was not a commercial success.
