= Escape from Hell (2000 film) =

- Directed by: Danny Carrales (credited as Danny R. Carrales)
- Written by: Michael Martin
- Produced by: Danny Carrales; Terra Schock (associate producer); Randy Smith
- Starring: Daniel Kruse; Emilie Jo Tisdale; Terry Jernigan; Paul Stober
- Cinematography: James Burgess
- Edited by: Danny Carrales (credited as Danny R. Carrales)
- Production company: DRC Films
- Release date: 2000
- Running time: 78 minutes
- Country: United States
- Language: English

Escape from Hell is a 2000 Christian horror thriller film.

== Plot ==
The film is about young Dr. Eric Robinson (played by Daniel Kruse), who becomes obsessed with the idea of an afterlife that leads all people to heaven. Through a series of events that leads to his own death, he finds out that hell is a very real place for those who have rejected the grace and love of Jesus Christ.

== Cast ==
- Daniel Kruse - Dr. Eric Robinson
  - Cody Wilson - Young Eric
- Emilie Jo Tisdale - Dr. Marissa Holloway
- Terry Jernigan - Dr. Carl Burke
- Paul Stober - Tad Garrison
- Greg Provance - Tommy
- Lauren Edwards - Lauren Garrison
- Bob Lauro - Father
- Julie Jenny - Mother
- Lori Stober - Rachel Garrison
- Don Brooks - Reverend Lattimer
- Robert Seymone - Church Janitor
- Tony Quaranta - Electrician
- Darlene Fidity - Blind Woman
- Lisa Dunn - Drowner

== Reception ==
Ken James of Christian Spotlight on Entertainment gave the film 2/5 stars saying, "...many moviegoers today are used to big budget Hollywood-style eye candy and so may be unable to get over the lesser effects 'Escape...' brings. The acting is substandard in some areas as well, and the quality of the video feels more like a daytime television show than a blockbuster film. Yet we must remember that it is the gospel being preached here, and the Bible promises that..." Televangelist, Jack Van Impe, called the film, "...a great movie, a thriller, and masterfully produced..." Jerry Falwell (the 1st President of Liberty University) gave the film 4/5 stars and stated, "...If this doesn’t get a non-believer to think about life without Christ, nothing will..."
