= Federal headship =

Concept in Christian theology

Federal headship, also known as spiritual headship or simply headship refers to a concept taught in Christian theology, with respect to God, Jesus, man, and woman, that deals with the collective representativeness of a certain figure or race.

== In Christianity ==
In Christianity, this concept has been used to explain the concepts of the covenants found in the Bible. In particular, it has been applied to passages such as Romans 5:12-21, explaining the relation of all humanity with Adam, as well as the relation of redeemed humanity with Jesus Christ, who is called the last Adam. According to this understanding, as humanity's federal head Adam brought the entire human race into sin, misery, and death due to his disobedience. Christ, in his perfect obedience to God the Father, earned eternal life and blessedness for all his people.

The concept of headship can be found in the writings of the Church Fathers, including Irenaeus' Against Heresies and Augustine's City of God. The full theological articulation came in the time of the Protestant Reformation, and this doctrine is held by many Protestant churches, particularly in conservative Reformed and Presbyterian churches, as well as those of Conservative Anabaptism.

== See also ==
- Covenant Theology
- Calvinism
- Imputed Righteousness
- Original sin
- Christian views on sin
- Head covering for Christian women
