= Republication of the Covenant of Works =

Christian covenant theology

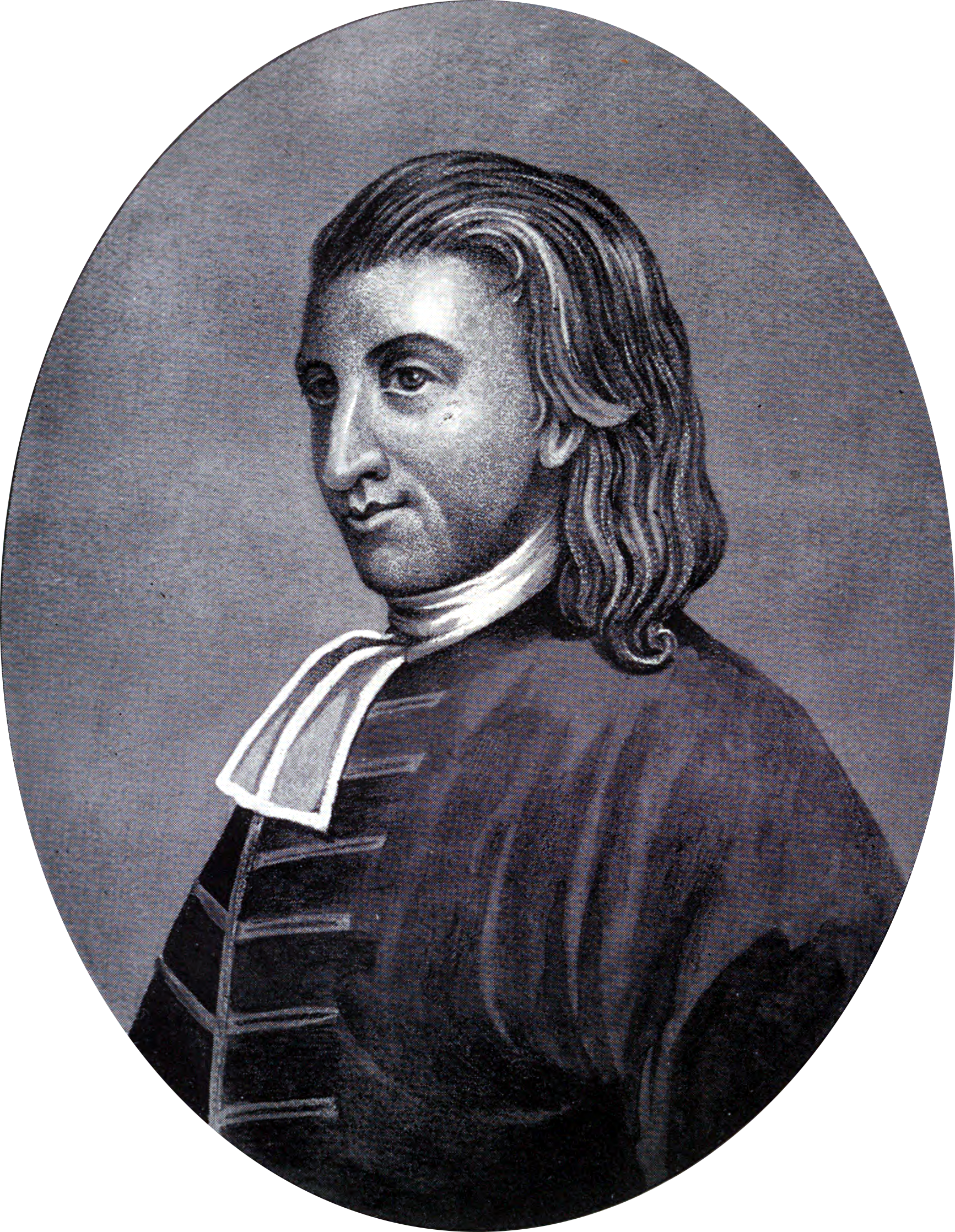
Thomas Boston taught that the Mosaic covenant was in some way a republication of the covenant of works.

Republication is a form of Christian covenant theology where the works principle of the covenant of works was republished in some way in the Mosaic covenant. The view is popular among academics of the Westminster Seminary California and was popularized by American theologian Meredith Kline. Kline taught that the Mosaic covenant included a typological republication of the covenant of works, where the Israelites had to maintain possession of the promised land by their "typological merit". Republication is similar to the Lutheran views of the Mosaic covenant.

== History ==
Some aspects of Republication were already taught by John Calvin, but not the view in its entirety. Later, Republication was taught by John Owen, believing that though the Mosaic covenant was a covenant of grace it included a layer of aspects republished from the covenant of works. Thomas Goodwin used similar language to Owen when describing the mosaic covenant. Edward Fisher, the author of the Marrow of Modern Divinity taught republication, saying "therefore, "the law entered," that Adam's offence and their own actual transgression might abound, so that now the Lord saw it needful, that there should be a new edition and publication of the covenant of works", thus the view was advocated by Thomas Boston, who was one of the Marrow divines.

Meredith Kline in more recent times has become the most influential advocate of the republication theory.

Other advocates of different forms of republication include Geerhardus Vos, Amandus Polanus, John Preston, and George Walker.

== Different views ==
=== Substantial republication ===
Substantial republication means that the Mosaic covenant at its core was a covenant of works. The view that the Mosaic covenant is at its core a covenant of works was taught by 1689 federalists, Amandus Polanus and John Preston. A somewhat similar view has been taught by some Dispensationalists.

=== Administrative republication ===
Administrative republication teaches that while the Mosaic covenant was a covenant of grace, it included a layer of aspects from the covenant of works. This is the position of John Owen, Marrow Brethren and Thomas Goodwin.

=== Subservient covenant ===
Moses Amyraut, John Cameron and Samuel Bolton held to a "subservient covenant" view, which proposed that the Mosaic covenant was a third kind of covenant by substance, as opposed to the view that there are two covenants, a covenant of works and a covenant of grace. Amyraut's view is different from administrative republication; however, his view still had some common elements with republication, as in his theory the Mosaic covenant promised temporal life in Canaan for obedience.

=== Mixed covenant ===
Very few have proposed that the Mosaic covenant had two substances, being both a covenant of grace and of works, the view was advocated by George Walker and other anonymous writers.

== See also ==
- Marrow controversy
- Mosaic covenant
