= Baptist covenant theology =

Baptist biblical interpretive framework

Baptist covenant theology, also known as Baptist federalism, or even 1689 federalism, is the historic Baptist conceptual overview and interpretive framework for understanding the overall structure of the Bible. It sees the theological concept of a covenant as an organizing principle for Christian theology. The standard form of covenant theology views the history of God's dealings with mankind, from Creation to Fall to Redemption to Consummation, under the framework of three overarching theological covenants: those of redemption, of works, and of grace.

Covenentalists call these three covenants "theological" because, though not explicitly presented as such in the Bible, they are thought of as theologically implicit, describing and summarizing a wealth of scriptural data. Historical Reformed systems of thought treat classical covenant theology not merely as a point of doctrine or as a central dogma, but as the structure by which the biblical text organizes itself. The most well known form of covenant theology is associated with Presbyterians (paedobaptists), known as Westminster Federalism, and comes from the Westminster Confession of Faith. Baptist covenant theology (credobaptist) is distinct from Westminsterian covenant theology, and finds its most influential expression in the Second London Confession of Faith of 1689.

There exist two forms of Baptist covenant theology: the original "Baptist Federalism", best expressed in the Second London Confession, and a more recent 20th century strand influenced by New Calvinism.

== Covenant theology ==
The principal difference between these two variants of covenant theology is their understanding of the Covenant of Grace. Standard Westminster covenant theology sees the Covenant of Grace beginning with The Fall in Genesis 3, and continuing through the Old Covenant and the New Covenant, under the same "substance" but different "administrations". The Covenant of Grace, the Old Covenant, and the New Covenant then, all have the same substance though only differ in the fact that the Old Covenant and the New Covenant constitute two separate administrations of that single substance. Covenant theology under the Second London Confession of Faith, in contrast, also sees the Covenant of Grace as beginning with The Fall in Genesis 3, and continuing through the Old Covenant and the New Covenant. But it sees the substance of the Covenant of Grace as being the same as the New Covenant, though not the Old Covenant. The Covenant of Grace, then, is the same thing as the New Covenant. As such, the Covenant of Grace coexists with the Old Covenant though is not the Old Covenant. Instead, under the Old Covenant it is a series of promises that point towards the New Covenant, and won't be realized until that point.

The Westminster Confession of Faith outlines this "one substance, two administrations" understanding by specifying that under the Old Covenant, the covenant was "administered by promises, prophecies, sacrifices, circumcision, the paschal lamb, and other types and ordinances", while under the New Covenant, the covenant is administered by "the preaching of the Word, and the administration of the sacraments" so that "there are not, therefore, two covenants of grace differing in substance, but one and the same under various dispensations. In contrast, the Second London Confession of Faith condenses this all down to say that the Covenant of Grace was revealed progressively over Old Testament history after Genesis 3 "by further steps, until the full discovery thereof was completed in the New Testament."

Since the Covenant of Works and the Covenant of Grace are the only redemptive covenants, stemming from the Covenant of Redemption, salvation is only possible through the Covenant of Grace, as in the covenant theology of standard Westminster paedobaptist federalism. Between The Fall in Genesis 3 and the New Covenant are several other covenants, in particular the covenant of Abraham, the covenant of Moses, and the covenant of David. But these covenants are "works and law" covenants and not "redemptive" covenants, since they exist only for specific earthly purposes in space and time, such as to allow Israel to live in the promised land under the conditions given in the covenant. Though their substance is different from the Covenant of Grace, and are therefore not part of that covenant, they do point to the promises in that covenant. They do this by drawing on typology, and as such consist of "types" and "antitypes", where the "type" is the explicit purpose of that covenant, but the "antitype" is the way in which that covenant points towards the promises of the Covenant of Grace through the New Covenant. Salvation was therefore possible for people under the Old Covenant through the Covenant of Grace if they had saving faith in these promises. Covenant theology under Westminster Federalism allows paedobaptism since it sees a greater continuity between the Old Covenant and the New Covenant. Covenant theology under Baptist Federalism, in contrast, supports credobaptism under the regulative principle since it sees less direct continuity between the Old Covenant and the New Covenant, even if it still sees major continuity through the overarching Covenant of Grace.

Some Baptists agree with Presbyterians on believing in one covenant of grace with multiple administrations, yet holding that the different administrations of the covenant of grace may have large differences. Additionally seeing circumcision as a type of regeneration and deny the continuity with circumcision and Baptism.
