= Active obedience of Christ =

Christ's obedience to the law of God as described in Protestant Christian theology

In Protestant theology, the active obedience of Jesus Christ (sometimes called his preceptive obedience) comprises the totality of his actions, which Christians believe was in perfect obedience to the law of God. Christ's active obedience (doing what God's law required) is usually distinguished from his passive obedience, namely suffering, dying, and substituting himself for sins of his people.

In Reformed theology, Christ's active obedience is generally believed to be imputed to Christians as part of their justification.

== The life of Christ ==
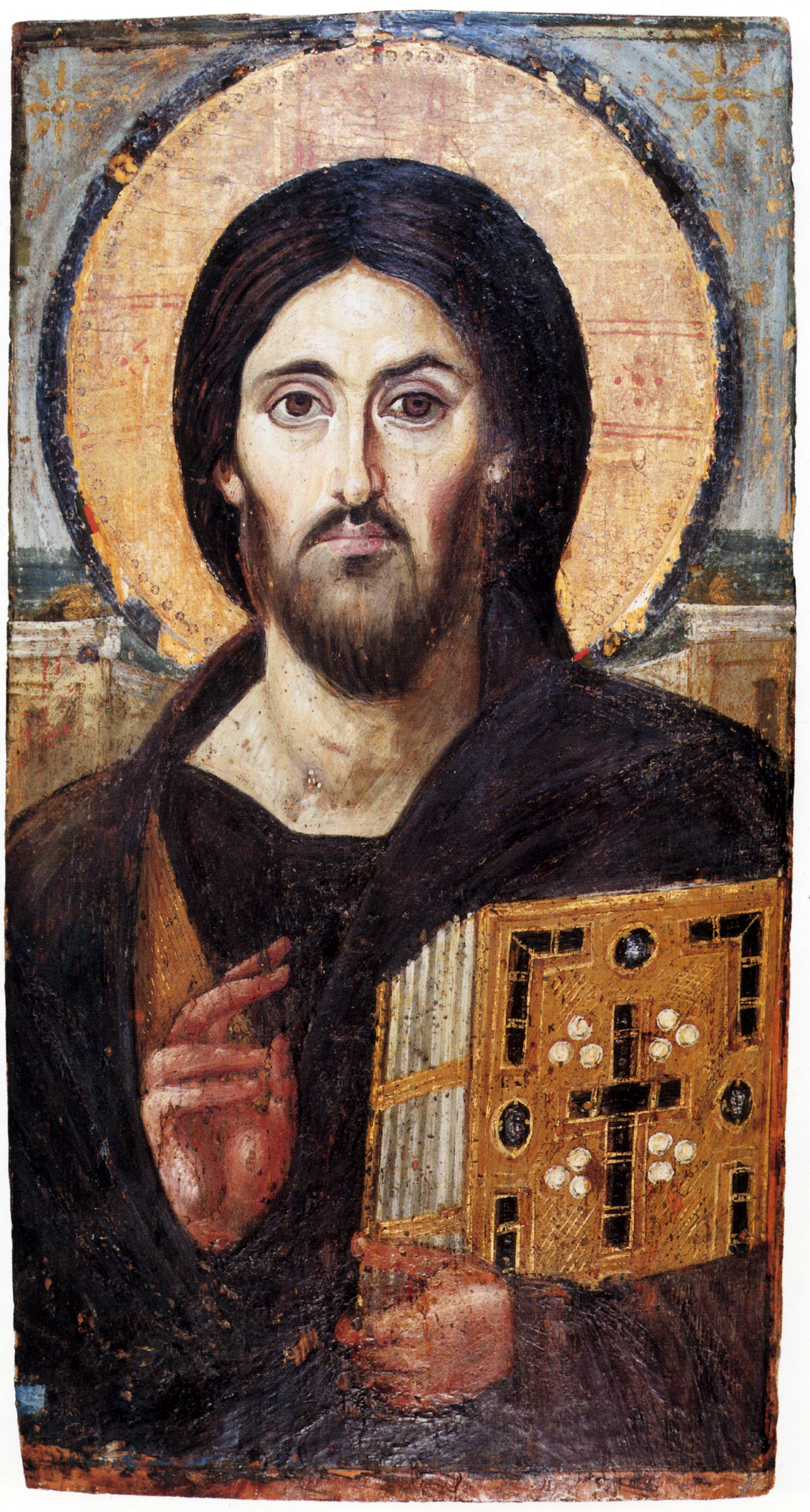
Jesus, whom the Bible describes as being without sin.

In Acts 3:14, Peter calls Jesus "the Holy and Righteous One", while in Acts 10:38 Peter says Christ "...went around doing good and healing all who were under the power of the devil, because God was with him."

According to the Bible, in Hebrews 4:15, Jesus was "without sin". Robert L. Reymond interprets Romans 5:18 (which talks about his "one act of righteousness") as referring to Christ's "entire life work", and the references to Christ being a "servant" as indicating his obedience.

Christ's active obedience (doing what God's law required) is usually distinguished from his passive obedience (suffering for his people), but J. Gresham Machen argues, "Every event of his life was a part of his payment for the penalty of sins, and every event of his life was a part of that glorious keeping of the law of God by which he earned for his people the reward of eternal life and a proper standing with God."

Machen also points out that Jesus was not subject to the law for himself and that "no obedience was required of him for himself, since he was Lord of all."

== Imputation ==
The imputation of Christ's active obedience is a doctrine within Lutheran and Reformed theology. It is based on the idea that God's righteousness demands perfect obedience to his law. By his active obedience, Christ has "made available a perfect righteousness by keeping the law that is imputed or reckoned to those who put their trust in him." The Heidelberg Catechism asserts that God grants to the believer "the perfect satisfaction, righteousness and holiness of Christ," so that the Christian can say that it is "as if I never had had, nor committed any sin: yea, as if I had fully accomplished all that obedience which Christ has accomplished for me" (Q&A 60). This imputation therefore constitutes the positive element of justification.

The imputation of Christ's active obedience has its foundation in the idea of a covenant of works made with Adam, though this has been the subject of debate, since covenantal language is not employed until the Noahic covenant in Genesis 6. Machen argues that "if Christ had merely paid the penalty of sin for us and done nothing more we should be at best back in the situation in which Adam found himself when God placed him under the covenant of works." As a result of this, our "attainment of eternal life would have been dependent upon our perfect obedience to the law of God," and we would be certain to fall. Machen goes on to say that Christ was "our representative both in penalty paying and in probation keeping," and that for those who have been saved by him, the probation is over since "Christ has merited for them the reward by his perfect obedience to God's law."

== Criticism ==
=== Arminianism ===
The imputation of Christ's active obedience has usually been denied by Arminians, who, according to Louis Berkhof, argue that justification simply places man "in the position of Adam before the fall."

=== Calvinism ===
Some within the Reformed community, particularly writers associated with the Federal Vision theology, have objected to the traditional formulation of this doctrine, because of its basis in the covenant of works and the idea of merit. James B. Jordan argues that the "transformation... achieved by Jesus was not something 'earned' like a weekly allowance." What is transferred to the believer is not Jesus' "works and merits" but his "glorified and resurrected life in the Spirit."

=== New Covenant theology ===
Steve Lehrer and Geoff Volker, adherents of New Covenant Theology, are critical of this view, even though they received formal training through Covenant Theology seminaries. They refer to Hebrews 10:11–14 to conclude "The sacrifice of Christ or the imputation of the passive obedience of Christ does two things for the believer. First, it makes the believer perfect—that is the believer is viewed as though he had obeyed the law perfectly (v. 14a). Second, it purchases a work of the Spirit in the life of the believer that guarantees that he will grow in holiness (v. 14b)." They then show, via Hebrews 10:15–22, that this is the New Covenant. The sinless life of Christ, and the keeping of the law, proved that he was righteous, rather than making him righteous.

== Importance ==
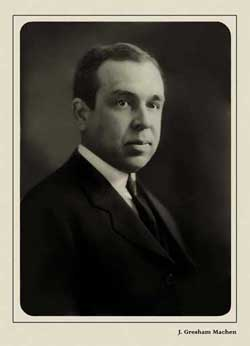
J. Gresham Machen, who declared on his death-bed that there is no hope without the active obedience of Christ.

As he lay dying, J. Gresham Machen, the American Presbyterian theologian, sent a final telegram to his friend John Murray containing the words, "I'm so thankful for the active obedience of Christ. No hope without it."

== See also ==
- Expounding of the Law
- Life of Jesus in the New Testament
- Perfection of Christ
