= Eppagelía =

Greek term in the New Testament

Eppagelía is the Greek term for promise used in the Bible for the promises of God, mostly in the Epistles of Paul. The term is much less common in the Synoptic Gospels, used only rarely in Mark, Luke and Acts, and not at all in Matthew. It is used in the Septuagint for different Hebrew terms but the Epistles give it Christological significance.

== New Covenant ==
The term eppagelía is used in Hebrews 9:15 for the "promised eternal inheritance" of the New Covenant with God following the "deliverance from trangressions under the first covenant. According to John Calvin this is to "draw away the Jews from the Law to Christ. For, if the Law was so weak that all the remedies it applied for expiating sins did by no means accomplish what they represented, who could rest in it as in a safe harbor?".

== Parousia ==
1 Peter 3:3–4 uses the term as the promise of parousia: "...in the last days scoffers will come [to] scoff, living according to their own desires and saying, "Where is the promise of his coming?".

== Inheritance ==
Several times in the Epistles the phrase "children of the promise" is held in contrast to the "children of the flesh". Romans 9:8–9 says "it is not the children of the flesh who are the children of God, but the children of the promise who are counted as descendents". Of Abraham's inheritance Hebrews 11:7 says "he sojourned in the promised land as in a foreign country, dwelling in tents with Isaac and Jacob, heirs of the same promise". Galatians 4:28–31 refers to the recipients of the Epistle as the children of the promise "like Isaac". The verse makes reference to Genesis 21:10:

Drive out the slave woman and her son!
For the son of the slave woman shall not
share the inheritance with the son.

Galatians specifies that the children of the promise can not be the children of the slave woman, only the freeborn woman.

The eppagelia is the source of the diathéké (covenants). Hagar (the slave woman) represents the Mosaic covenant as the slave status is inherited by Hagar's children, akin to the covenant relationship of the Israelites with God (described as douleian, slavery).
