= Covenant (religion) =

Formal agreement made by and with God

In religion, a covenant is a formal alliance or agreement made by God with a religious community or with humanity in general. The concept, central to the Abrahamic religions, is derived from the biblical covenants, notably from the Abrahamic covenant. Christianity asserts that God made an additional covenant through Jesus Christ, called the "New Covenant".

A covenant in its most general sense and historical sense, is a solemn promise to engage in or refrain from a specified action. A covenant is a type of agreement analogous to a contractual condition. The covenantor makes a promise to a covenantee to do (affirmative covenant) or not do some action (negative covenant).

== Biblical ==
Covenant is the customary word used to translate the Hebrew word berith. A covenant denotes a relationship of oaths and promises, which involves reciprocal, yet not necessarily equal, commitments. It is used in the Masoretic Text 264 times. The equivalent word in the Septuagint and the Greek New Testament is διαθήκη, diatheke. Also it means a formal agreement

The Mosaic covenant refers to a biblical covenant between God and the biblical Israelites. The establishment and stipulations of the Mosaic covenant are recorded in the first five books of the Hebrew Bible, which are traditionally attributed to Mosaic authorship and collectively called the Torah, and this covenant is sometimes also referred to as the Law of Moses or Mosaic Law or the 613 Mitzvot.

Covenants are often initiated by an oath and can be of two types: grants or treaties. Grants are generally unilateral, unconditional covenants such as those where God made unconditional promises to Noah (Genesis 9), Abraham (Genesis 15, Genesis 17) and David (2 Samuel 7:8ff). Bilateral covenants are generally conditional with blessings for obedience and curses for disobedience as in Deuteronomy 28 and 30.

== Christianity ==
Biblical theology and systematic theology for covenants often intertwines the unilateral and the bilateral, the conditional and the unconditional, such that much has been written and said about "Old" and "New" Covenants and the extent to which the "Old Covenant" still persists. The typology of covenants is governed by the distribution of covenant obligations between the covenanting parties.

The New Covenant is a biblical interpretation derived partly from a phrase in the Book of Jeremiah, (Jeremiah 31:31), in the Hebrew Bible. There are several Christian eschatologies that further define the New Covenant. For example, an inaugurated eschatology defines and describes the New Covenant as an ongoing relationship between Christian believers and God that will be in full fruition after the Second Coming of Christ; that is, it will not only be in full fruition in believing hearts, but in the future external world as well. The connection between the blood of Christ and the New Covenant is seen in most modern English translations of the New Testament with the saying: "this cup that is poured out for you is the new covenant in my blood".

Christians believe that Jesus is the mediator of the New Covenant, and that the blood of Christ shed at his crucifixion is the required blood of the covenant. As with all covenants between God and man described in the Bible, the New Covenant is considered "a bond in blood sovereignly administered by God." It has been theorized that the New Covenant is the Law of Christ as spoken during his Sermon on the Mount.

Covenant theology, a theological system within Reformed Christianity, holds that God relates to man primarily through three covenants: the Covenant of Redemption, the Covenant of Works, and the Covenant of Grace. In this theological system a covenant may be defined as, "an unchangeable, divinely imposed legal agreement between God and man that stipulates the conditions of their relationship." Michael Horton argues that humans are covenant creatures by nature, meaning that humans were not created first and then given a covenant. But instead, humans were created as covenant beings.

=== Moravianism ===
The Moravian Covenant for Christian Living is taken by members of the Moravian Church that delineates their commitment as Christians.

=== Methodism ===
In historic Methodism, those who become full members of Methodist congregation are bound to a covenant. In the Allegheny Wesleyan Methodist Connection, those probationers entering into the Church as full members are read the following covenant:

You solemnly, severally avouch the Lord Jehovah, Father, Son, and Holy Ghost, to be your God, the object of your supreme affections and your portion forever. You cordially accept the Lord Jesus to be your Redeemer, and the Holy Spirit your Sanctifier, Comforter, and Guide. You cheerfully devote yourselves to God in the everlasting covenant of His grace, consecrating all your powers and faculties to His service and glory. And you promise that you will cleave to Him as your chief good; that you will give diligent attention to His Word and ordinances; that you will seek the honor and advancement of His kingdom; and that henceforth, denying all ungodliness and worldly lusts, you will live soberly, righteously, and godly in this present world. You do also cordially join yourselves to this church, and engage to submit to all its rules of government; to seek earnestly its peace, purity, and edification, and to walk with all its members in charity and faithfulness and sobriety. Do you thus freely and solemnly devote yourselves to be the Lord’s? Answer: I do.

The Emmanuel Association of Churches, a Methodist denomination in the conservative holiness movement, uses the following Covenant:

Dearly Beloved: The Scriptures teach us that the church is the household of God, the body of which Christ is the Head, and that it is the design of the gospel to bring together all who are one in Christ to aid in that fellowship which is communion one with another in the Holy Ghost. The end of this fellowship is to promote sound doctrine, to exercise the duty of godly admonition, and to further the cause of true holiness. Its more particular duties are to bear one another burdens, to prevent each other from stumbling, and to continue steadfast in the faith and worship of our Heavenly Father. The privileges of this fellowship are watchful care of pastors, the enjoyments of the blessings which come from those of like faith, and the peculiar incitement to holiness. This covenant into which you are entering today is a solemn statement of your fidelity and a pledge of our purpose to maintain the "Principles of Faith" and "Principles of Holy Living" as given in the Guidebook of the Emmanuel Association of Churches.
Do you fully and joyfully agree that the doctrines as set forth in the "Principles of Faith" in the Guidebook are Bible doctrines? Answer: "I do."
Will you maintain the means of grace—such as secret and family devotions, assembling together for prayer and worship, and giving liberally to support the work of the church and the ministry of the gospel throughout the whole world? Answer: "I will."
Will you refrain from worldly amusements—such as dances, shows, theatrical performances, festivals, church plays, fairs, horse and auto races, any form of gambling, competitive games, and church picnics and socials? Will you keep away from false religious teachings, and abstain from purposely listening to the radio, and from watching television? Answer: "I will."
Will you avoid worldly dress—such as gaudy or transparent apparel, and costly change of raiment? Answer: "I will."
Will you abstain from all world and unscriptural alliances—such as secret societies, lodges which are oath-bound, and organizations both of capital and labor? Answer: "I will."
Will you remember the Christian sabbath to keep it holy by doing no worldly business therein, such as buying or selling and by refraining from all pleasure seeking and from any occupation or travel which cannot be done for the glory of God?" Answer: "I will."
Will you abstain from all such sin as tattling, backbiting, evil speaking, and unprofitable conversation? Answer: "I will."
Will you walk together in humility and carefulness, giving and receiving admonition in the fear of God, praying for another, and remembering each other in sickness and in other times of need? Will you be careful at all times to manifest meekness of spirit, gentleness of heart, and Christlike firmness in upholding God's standards of holiness in every walk of life? Answer: "I will."
Do you now, in the fear of God and in the presence of these witnesses, accept this covenant in whole and in part, promising the utmost of your ability and with the help of God to observe faithfully this sacred vow? Answer: "I do."
Brethren, these persons, having answered these questions satisfactorily, and having taken this covenant, are now members of this body of believers. We welcome you and extend to you the right hand of fellowship, praying that you may be faithful and useful members of the Church Militant until you are called to the fellowship of the Church Triumphant which is before the throne of God.

Methodists connexions, such as those of the Free Methodist Church, United Methodist Church and Pilgrim Holiness Church, traditionally celebrate a watchnight service that takes the form of a Covenant Renewal Service annually on New Year's Eve, in which members renew their covenant with God and the Church. In the Immanuel Missionary Church, a Methodist connexion in conservative holiness movement, those who repeatedly do not partake of the means of grace may be excluded from church membership if they do not "repent and amend".

=== Holiness Pentecostalism ===
Holiness Pentecostal denominations have a Covenant to which members are expected to adhere, similar to Methodist denominations. In the International Pentecostal Holiness Church, those who take their covenant recite the following:

With these values in mind, we recognize that the blessed Spirit of God has called us to live this countercultural lifestyle that sets us apart from the world. Therefore, having become acquainted with the Articles of Faith and the polity of the International Pentecostal Holiness Church, and believing both to be of God, and having given our names and thereby become members of the same, we do solemnly, but cheerfully, and with joy and gladness affirm:

We will watch over one another with brotherly love and kindness, not that we may have whereof to accuse our brother, but that we may with meekness correct one another’s faults. We will abstain from profane and vulgar conversations, and from backbiting and gossiping, or taking up a reproach against anyone, especially our brother. We will heed the injunction of the apostle Paul, who exhorted us to “walk worthy of the vocation wherewith we are called, with all lowliness and meekness, with longsuffering, forbearing one another in love; endeavoring to keep the unity of the Spirit in the bond of peace” (Ephesians 4:1-3). We will “bear one another’s burdens and so fulfill the law of Christ” (Galatians 6:2). We will also heed the exhortation recorded in 1 Thessalonians 5:12-15: We beseech you, brethren, to know them which labor among you, and are over you in the Lord, and admonish you; And to esteem them very highly in love for their work’s sake. And be at peace among yourselves. Now we exhort you, brethren, warn them that are unruly [disorderly], comfort the feebleminded, support the weak, be patient toward all men; See that none render evil for evil unto any man; but ever follow that which is good, both among yourselves, and to all men. We will “recompense” to no man evil for evil,” but will “provide things honest in the sight of all men,” and, “if it be possible, as much as lieth in [us], [we will] live peaceably with all men” (Romans 12:17, 18). We will be “kind one to another, tenderhearted, forgiving one another, even as God for Christ’s sake hath forgiven [us]” (Ephesians 4:32). As opportunity affords, we will be engaged in works of mercy, such as visiting the sick and imprisoned and the distressed, and all who may need and will accept our ministrations. We will have no fellowship with unfruitful works of darkness but keep ourselves by the grace of God unspotted from the world (Ephesians 5:1-11; 1 Peter 1:5; James 1:27).

All this will we do, God being our Helper.

Response: We accept the obligations of this Covenant of Commitment in the name of the Father and of the Son and of the Holy Ghost.

=== Latter Day Saints ===
In the Latter Day Saint movement, a covenant is a promise made between God and a person or a group of people. God sets the conditions of the covenant, and as the conditions are met, he blesses the person who entered into and kept the covenant. If the covenant is violated, blessings are withheld and in some cases a penalty or punishment is inflicted.

The Church of Jesus Christ of Latter-day Saints (LDS Church) teaches that one enters a covenant through a ritual or a visible sign. Some leaders have taught that a covenant is always associated with an ordinance. Other leaders have suggested that commandments that include promised blessings for compliance—such as the law of tithing and Word of Wisdom—also constitute covenants.

In the LDS Church, ordinances which are accompanied by covenants include baptism and confirmation; partaking of the sacrament; reception of the Melchizedek priesthood; the temple endowment; and celestial marriage. These are known as "saving ordinances" and are a requirement for exaltation.

Officially, partaking of the sacrament is considered by the LDS Church to be a renewal of the covenants made at baptism; however, some Latter-day Saint leaders have taught that doing so constitutes a renewal of all covenants a person has made.

== Islam ==
The original covenant made between God and mankind marked the beginning of creation according to Islamic theology. It is believed that before the creation of the heavens and the earth, God assembled all of creation (that would ever exist) in a timeless, placeless region and informed them of the truth of his existence. This moment is referred to in the verse 7:172 of the Quran as follows:

وَ إِذْ أَخَذَ رَبُّكَ مِنْ بَني آدَمَ مِنْ ظُهُورِهِمْ ذُرِّيَّتَهُمْ وَ أَشْهَدَهُمْ عَلى أَنْفُسِهِمْ أَ لَسْتُ بِرَبِّكُمْ قالُوا بَلى شَهِدْنا أَنْ تَقُولُوا يَوْمَ الْقِيامَةِ إِنَّا كُنَّا عَنْ هذا غافِلين

Wa-ith akhatha rabbuka minbanee adama min thuhoorihim thurriyyatahumwaashhadahum AAala anfusihim alastu birabbikum qaloobala shahidna an taqooloo yawma alqiyamatiinna kunna AAan hatha ghafileen

And ˹remember˺ when your Lord brought forth from the loins of the children of Adam their descendants and had them testify regarding themselves. ˹Allah asked,˺ “Am I not your Lord?” They replied, “Yes, You are! We testify.” ˹He cautioned,˺ “Now you have no right to say on Judgment Day, ‘We were not aware of this.’

This covenant is significant in that it asserts that an understanding of the origin of man is something deeply inherent to and natural within every person. Any disconnection from this memory is referred to as being ‘forgetful’ within the scripture, hadith literature and commentary. The Quran constantly implores people to recall and remember. Scholars suggest that the call to remember throughout the Quran is in fact a call to remember this particular moment in their spiritual history. Suggestions are also made that where people recognise people with ease, it is usually as a memory from this event. To strive to remember through invocations and contemplation is thus considered a form of worship in Islam called dhikr.

There are many scholarly perspectives taken on the significance of this covenant. It is understood as marking the beginning of human consciousness with mankind making their first conscious response to the divine question 'Am I not your lord?'. Some also see it as being relevant to the Islamic principle of Tawhid or unity as the entirety of mankind was said to have been assembled on this date.

Another perspective is that as an Abrahamic faith, the covenant was made with Abraham. Any person confessing to faith can become a Muslim and partake of this covenant with God:

And ˹remember˺ when We made the Sacred House a centre and a sanctuary for the people ˹saying˺, “˹You may˺ take the standing-place of Abraham as a site of prayer.” And We entrusted Abraham and Ishmael to purify My House for those who circle it, who meditate in it, and who bow and prostrate themselves ˹in prayer˺.

— Surah Al-Baqara 2:125

Gerhard Bowering has written about the mystical aspects of the Covenant in Islam.

== Bahá'í Faith ==
In the Bahá'í Faith, a religious covenant is considered a binding agreement between God and humans wherein a certain behavior is required of individuals and in return God guarantees certain blessings. For Bahá'ís there are two distinct covenants: a Greater Covenant which is made between every prophet or messenger from God and his followers concerning the next divine teacher to come; and a Lesser Covenant that concerns successorship of authority within the religion after the prophet dies.

According to Bahá'u'lláh, the founder of the Bahá'í Faith, in the greater covenant God promises to always send divine teachers to instruct humankind in a process known as progressive revelation. Bahá'ís believe prophecies pertaining to God's greater covenant are found in the scriptures of all religions, and each messenger from God specifically prophesies about the next one to come. For their part in the greater covenant, the followers of each religion have a duty to investigate with an open mind whether a person who claims to be the promised messenger of their faith does, or does not, spiritually fulfill relevant prophecies.

To differentiate it from God's eternal greater covenant with humankind, Bahá'ís refer to a manifestation's agreement with his followers regarding whom they should turn to and obey immediately after his passing as the lesser covenant. Two distinctive features of the Bahá'í lesser covenant, which is referred to within the Bahá'í Faith as the Covenant of Bahá'u'lláh, are that it is explicit and also conveyed in authenticated written documents. Bahá'ís consider Bahá'u'lláh's covenant as unique in religious history, and the most powerful means for ensuring the spiritual health of the Faith's adherents, and their enduring unity and complete protection from any efforts to foment dissension or to create schism.

== Other religions ==
In Indo-Iranian religious tradition, Mithra-Mitra is the hypostasis of covenant, and hence keeper and protector of moral, social and interpersonal relationships, including love and friendship. In living Zoroastrianism, which is one of the two primary developments of Indo-Iranian religious tradition, Mithra is by extension a judge, protecting agreements by ensuring that individuals who break one do not enter Heaven.

== See also ==
- Christian views on the Old Covenant
- Covenantal theology (Roman Catholic)
- Covenant (law)
