= Covenantal theology (Catholic Church) =

Approach to Catholic theology

Covenantal theology is a distinctive approach to Catholic biblical theology stemming from the mid-twentieth century recovery of Patristic methods of interpreting scripture by scholars such as Henri de Lubac. This recovery was given further impetus by Dei verbum, the Second Vatican Council's "Dogmatic Constitution on Divine Revelation", and consolidated in the section on scripture Catechism of the Catholic Church (nos. 101–41). These developments gave rise to an approach that emphasizes the "four senses" of scripture within a framework that structures salvation history via the biblical covenants, in combination with the techniques of modern biblical scholarship.

== General description ==
Covenantal theology has its roots in Patristic interpretation of Scripture, drawing on the theology of history and exegetical methods developed by the Fathers. Notable for the theology of history are Irenaeus's emphasis on the unity of the Old and New Testaments in Against Heresies and Augustine's explication of that unity through the "two cities" theme in The City of God (Books XI–XXII). Closely related are the exegetical methods by which Scripture is explained according to its "spiritual senses". These developments were organized by the scholastics into the doctrine of the "four senses," encompassing the literal sense and the three spiritual senses (allegorical, moral, and anagogical). The allegorical sense relates persons, events, and institutions of earlier covenants to those of later covenants (and especially to the New Covenant), thereby situating "spiritual" exegesis within the covenantal theology of history. In the modern period, the Patristic tradition of spiritual exegesis was overshadowed by scholarly focus on the literal sense using historical-critical techniques.

A revival of interest in spiritual exegesis began in the late 1950s, led by Henri de Lubac with his pioneering study, Medieval Exegesis. The historical studies of Jean Danielou, such as The Bible and the Liturgy and The Lord of History, were likewise seminal. In its "Dogmatic Constitution on Divine Revelation" of 1965, the Second Vatican Council taught that Scripture should be "read and interpreted in light of the same Spirit by whom it was written" (Dei verbum, 12), a Patristic formula associated with spiritual exegesis. The Catechism of the Catholic Church (1994, 1997) confirmed this teaching and specified that the necessary spiritual interpretation of Scripture should be sought through its four senses (nos. 111, 113, 115–19).

Encouraged by these developments, covenantal theology has been vigorously pursued from the 1990s onward; a good example of recent work is provided by Joseph Cardinal Ratzinger (Pope Benedict XVI) in Many Religions – One Covenant. In his discussion of methodology in the foreword to Jesus of Nazareth, the same author notes that "there are dimensions of the word that the old doctrine of the fourfold sense of Scripture pinpointed with remarkable accuracy," supporting a "Christological hermeneutic, which sees Jesus Christ as the key to the whole and learns from him to understand the Bible as a unity."

Covenantal theology is distinctive in its emphasis of the following tenets:

- The biblical covenants (Edenic, Adamic, Noahite, Abrahamic, Mosaic, Davidic, and New or Messianic) are taken to be the chief structural framework for salvation history.
- The Abrahamic covenant (as distinct from the Mosaic) is taken to be the central Old Testament covenant that is fulfilled in the New Testament, in accordance with Pauline theology (Galatians 3:6-29).
- The Old and New Testaments are taken to be integrally related through the sequence of covenants, with prophetic fulfillment understood chiefly in terms of covenantal correspondence.
- Scripture is interpreted via the four senses, with an emphasis on describing the correspondence between covenants via the allegorical sense.
- Jesus' prophecy in the Olivet Discourse is understood to have been fulfilled by the destruction of the Jerusalem Temple in 70 AD.
- Old Testament prophecy of a restoration of Israel in which Jews and Gentiles are united is understood to have been fulfilled in the Church, cf. Catechism of the Catholic Church 781 drawing on Lumen Gentium 9.
- Jesus is understood to have inaugurated the Kingdom of God, which advances throughout history from the Ascension to the Last Judgment, cf. Catechism of the Catholic Church 669-670.
- The advance of the Kingdom of God throughout history is interpreted in terms of the Augustinian concepts of the City of God and the City of Man.

Covenantal theology is reflected, with varying emphases, in the works of contemporary authors such as Scott Hahn (1998, 1999), Timothy Gray (1998), Edward Sri (1999, 2005), Michael Barber (2001, 2005), and Brant Pitre (2005, 2006).
