= Hermann Witsius =

Dutch theologian (1636–1708)

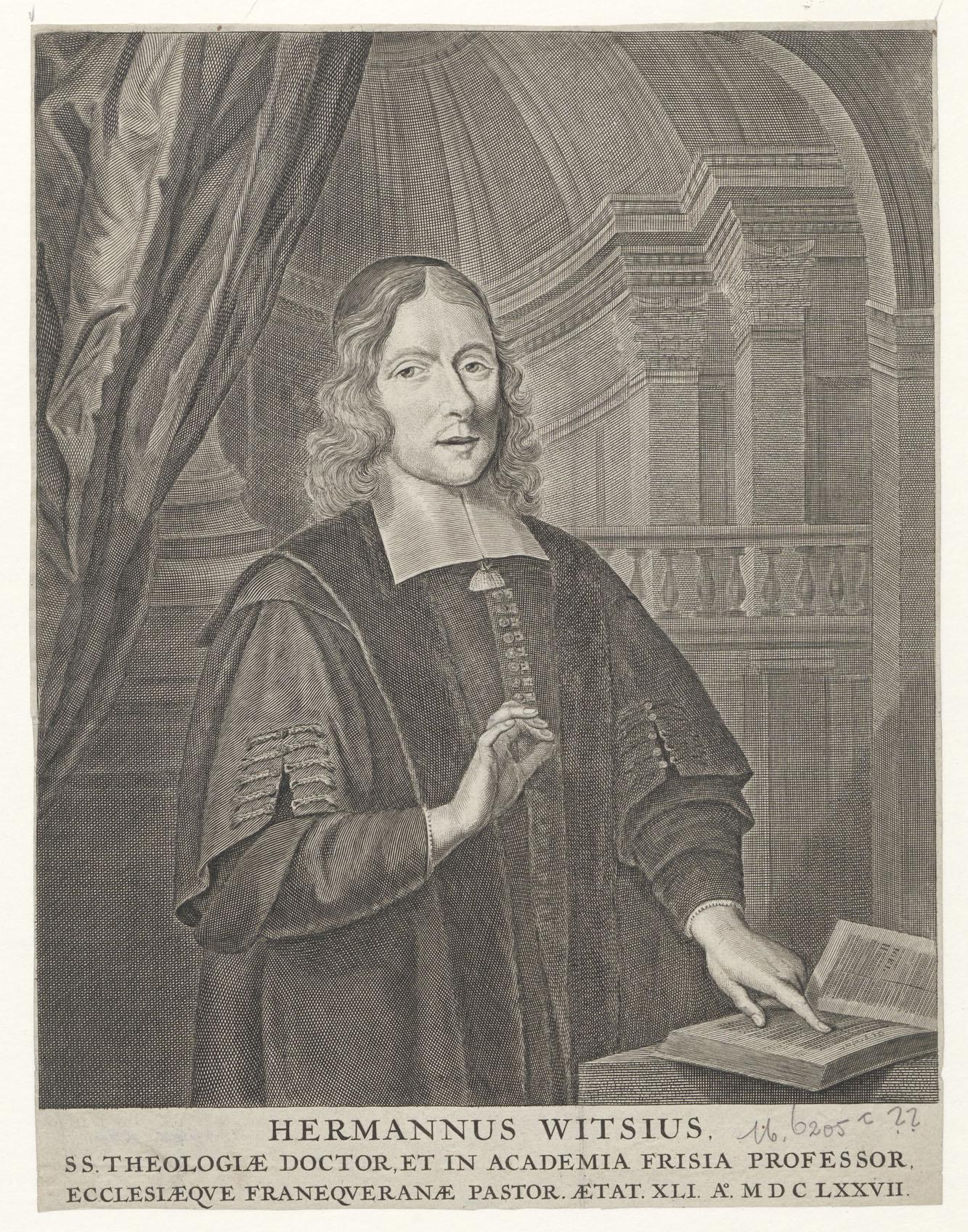
- Born: 12 February 1636; Enkhuizen, Netherlands
- Died: 22 October 1708 (aged 72); Leiden, Netherlands
- Education: Utrecht University (1651-1654, 1655), University of Groningen (1654-1655), Leiden University
- Occupation: Theologian · Author · Professor · Minister
- Notable work: The Economy of the Covenants between God and Man (1677)
- Spouse: Aletta van Borchorn
- Parent: Nicholas Witsius
- Theological work
- Tradition or movement: Dutch Reformed

Hermann Witsius (Herman Wits or in Latin Hermannus Witsius; 12 February 1636 – 22 October 1708, aged 72) was a Dutch theologian.

== Life ==
He was born at Enkhuizen. He studied at the University of Groningen, Leiden, and Utrecht. He was ordained in the ministry, becoming the pastor of Westwoud in 1656 and afterwards at Wormer, Goes, and Leeuwarden. He became professor of divinity successively at the University of Franeker in 1675 and at the University of Utrecht in 1680. Witsius became Chancellor of the University of Utrecht in 1686. In 1698 he was appointed to the University of Leiden as the successor of the younger Friedrich Spanheim. He died in Leiden on 22 October 1708.

== Views ==
While in his theology Witsius aimed at a reconciliation between the reigning orthodoxy and Covenant Theology (also known as federalism), he was first of all a Biblical theologian, his principal field being systematic theology. His chief work is entitled The Economy of the Covenants between God and Man (originally published in Latin: De oeconomia foederum Dei cum hominibus, Leeuwarden, 1677). He was induced to publish this work by his grief at the controversies between Voetians and Cocceians. Although himself a member of the federalistic school, he was in no way blind to the value of the scholastically established dogmatic system of the Church. In the end, he did not succeed in pleasing either party.

== Works ==
- The Economy of the Covenants between God and Man (originally published as De oeconomia foderum Dei cum hominibus (in Latin), Leeuwarden, 1677).
- Witsii, Hermanni (1739), De œconomia foederum Dei cum hominibus [The Economy of the Covenants between God & Man] (in Latin), vol. libri quatuor: Ex..., Archive.

Besides his principal work he published:

- Judaeus christianizans circa principia fidei et SS. Trinitatem (in Latin), Utrecht, 1661.
- Diatribe de septem epistolarum apocalypticarum sensu historico et prophetico (in Latin), Franeker, 1678.
- Exercitationes sacrae in symbolum quod apostolorum dicitur et in orationem Dominicam [Sacred dissertations on the symbol called the Apostles’ and in the Lord's Prayer] (in Latin), Franeker, 1681.
- Exercitationes sacræ in symbolum quod Apostolorum dicitur (in Latin), Archive, 1697, OL 23390157M
- Miscellanea sacra [Sacred miscellanea] (in Latin), Utrecht, 1692–1700, 2 vols.
- Witsii, Hermanni (1696), Aegyptiaca et Dekaphylon : sive, De Aegyptiacorum sacrorum cum Hebraicis collatione libri tres. Et de decem tribubus Israelis liber singularis. Accessit diatribe de legione fulminatrice christianorum, sub imperatore Marco Aurelio Antonino (in Latin), Archive, OL 23303262M
- ——— (1739), Meletemata leidensia: Quibus continentur praelectiones de vita et rebus gestis... (in Latin), Archive.
- ——— (1736), Quibus de prophetis & prophetia, de..., Miscellaneorum sacrorum (in Latin), vol. tomus primus, Archive.
- ——— (1736), Quibus de prophetis & prophetia, de..., Miscellaneorum sacrorum (in Latin), vol. tomus alter, Archive.

Of his minor works, there have appeared in English

- A Treatise on Christian Faith (London, 1761);
- An Essay on the Use and Abuse of Reason in Matters of Religion, Trans. John Carter, Norwich, 1795 (New Edition, CrossReach Publications, 2016)
- On the Character of a True Theologian (Edinburgh, 1877); and
- The Question: 'Was Moses the Author of the Pentateuch?' Answered in the Affirmative, Archive, 1877. OL 18093496M
- Sacred dissertations on the Lord's Prayer, Archive, 1839; Translation of Exercitationes in Orationem Dominicam [Exercises on the Lord’s prayer] (in Latin), OL 6426114M
- Sacred Dissertations: On what is Commonly Called the Apostles' Creed (Volume 1) (1823)
  - https://archive.org/details/sacreddissertat02witsgoog
  - https://archive.org/details/sacreddissertat00witsgoog
- Sacred Dissertations: On what is Commonly Called the Apostles' Creed (Volume 2) (1823)
  - https://archive.org/details/sacreddissertat01witsgoog
  - https://archive.org/details/sacreddissertat03witsgoog
- Conciliatory or irenical animadversions on the controversies agitated in Britain : under the unhappy names of antinomians and neonomians (1807) OL 25183530M
- Witsius, Herman (1806), The restoration of the Jews, London.
- Witsius, Herman (1806), "Infant baptism", The stone laid before Joshua : the substance of a sermon, London: Archive, OL 25009519M
