= Amandus Polanus =

German Reformed theologian

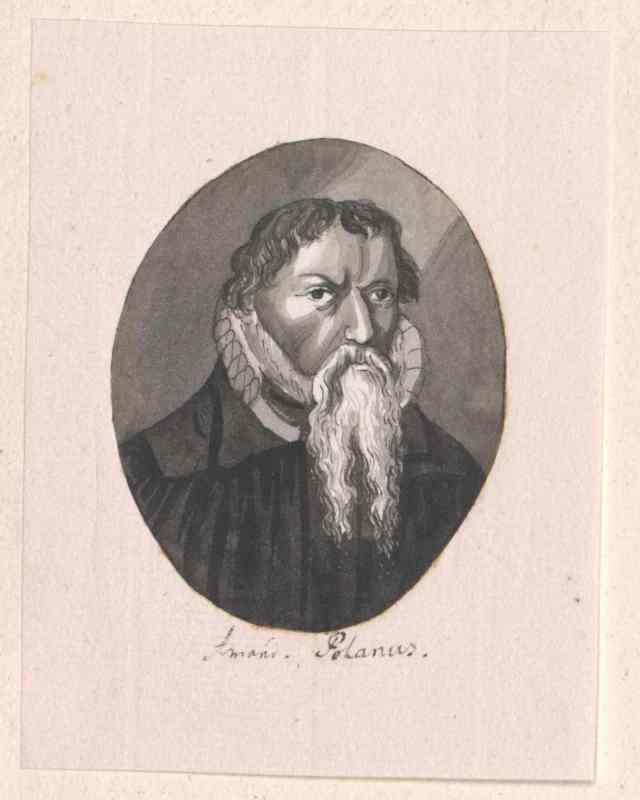

Amandus Polanus von Polansdorf (16 December 1561, Opava, Silesia – 17 July 1610, Basel, Switzerland) was a German theologian of early Reformed orthodoxy. After his education in Opava, Wrocław, Tübingen, Basel, and Geneva (1577–1584), he served as a tutor to the family of Zierotin in Heidelberg and Basel (1584–1590), and later taught at the Bohemian Brethren school in Ivančice. Between 1591 and 1595 he again tutored for the Zierotins, traveling from Moravia to Strasbourg and Basel. Polanus spent the last part of his life in Basel, where he became professor of Old Testament in April 1596, and later that year married the daughter of the professor of ancient languages, Johann Jakob Grynaeus (1540–1617). Polanus also served as a dean of the theological faculty between 1598 and 1600, and again later between 1601 and 1609, and he was rector of Basel University in 1600 and 1609.

He wrote the three volume dogmatic work Partitiones theologicae (Divisions of Theology) and Syntagma theologiae christianae (translated in English as A System of Christian Theology). In 1603, based on Luther's translation, Polanus composed the first Calvinistic German translation of the Bible. His major systematic works are marked by Aristotelian causal analysis and, most strikingly, by the methodology of Ramism. He showed concern for precision and clarity of presentation and polemical defense of Reformed doctrine. Yet he showed little interest in metaphysical speculation. His doctrine of God was central but it, and predestination, were balanced by other interests: Christology, covenant, ethics, and praxis. A consolidator not an innovator, his concern was to preserve Reformed teaching, so serving the contemporary needs of the church.

== Theology ==
Polanus' theological beliefs were shaped significantly by Ramist logic, which he utilized as a tool to organize doctrine in a systematic way. Despite his usage of Ramist structures, he often discussed themes such as the covenant of grace and the prophetic office of Christ. Polanus sharply distinguished the archetypal theology possessed by God and the ectypal theology given to creatures. He argued that the knowledge humans have about God is an adaptation of that perfect knowledge, adjusted to fit our limited minds. His beliefs were influenced primarily by Scripture and secondarily by logic. Polanus’ goal was to express doctrine in a way that supports church teaching along with supporting the daily lives of those within the Christian community. He believed Christians could declare wars to help believers suffering in other countries. Polanus attributed military victory entirely to divine providence rather than human skill or strategy, which is consistent with his broader emphasis on God governing the world’s activity.

== Political Thought ==
Polanus believed that Christians could legitimately declare war as a way to assist fellow believers beyond their own territories. This reflects the broader early Reformed concern regarding the defense of those who share their religious identity.

== Legacy ==
Polanus had a major influence in bringing together and organizing existing teachings rather than developing new doctrine. His emphasis on clarity and organization influenced later Reformed scholars when it came to explaining doctrine. While his work was overshadowed by other prominent theologians, it played an important part in shaping the stability of Reformed theology in the early seventeenth century. Polanus' emphasis on sapientia shaped later Reformed writers into treating the opening parts of theology in a more practical, pastoral, and moral way.
