= Caspar Olevian =

German Reformed theologian (1536–1587)

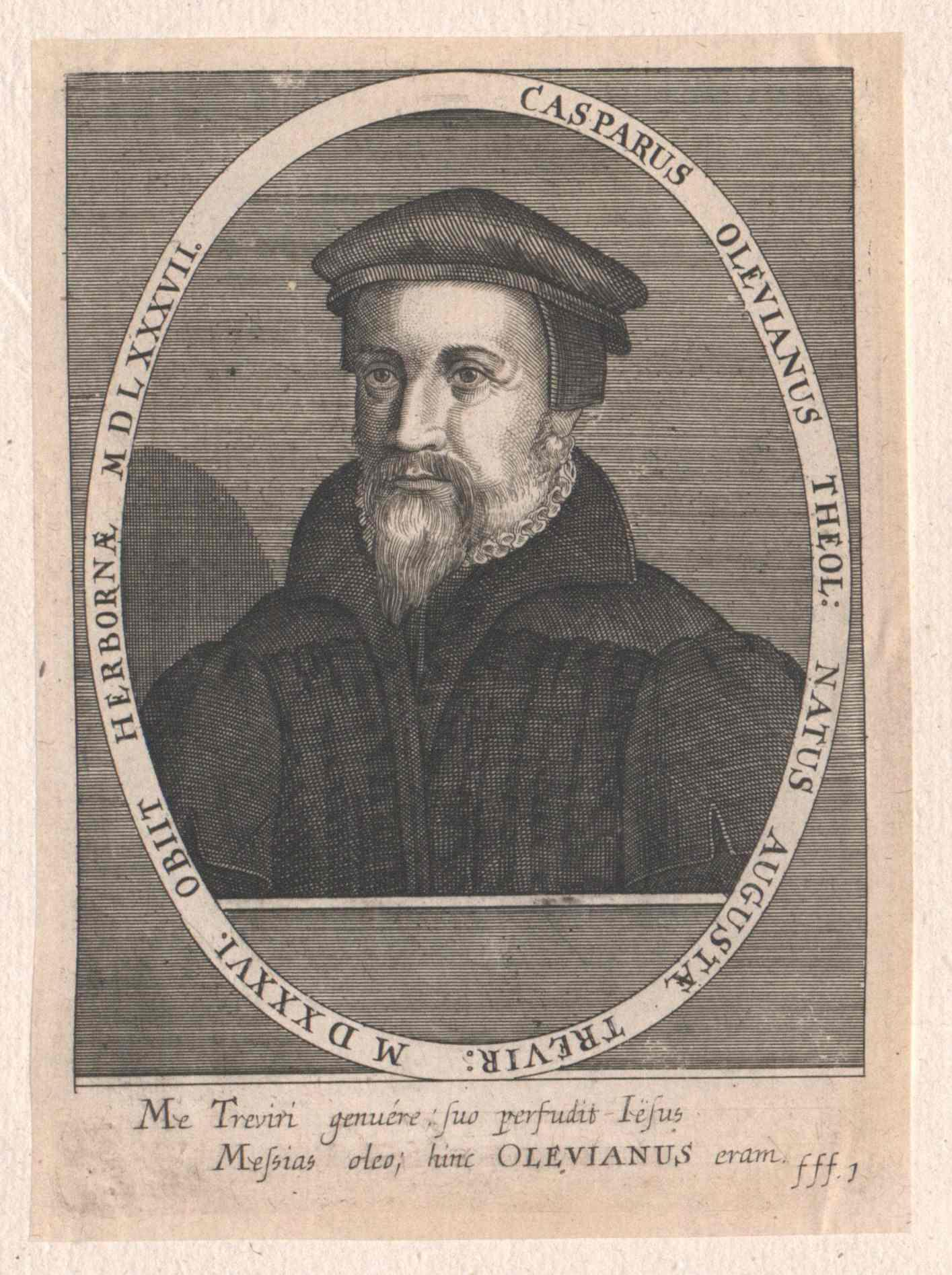
Caspar Olevian

Caspar Olevian (or Kaspar Olevianus; 10 August 1536 – 15 March 1587) was a significant German Reformed theologian during the Protestant Reformation and along with Zacharias Ursinus was said to be co-author of the Heidelberg Catechism. That theory of authorship has been questioned by some modern scholarship.

== Life ==
Born in Trier, Olevian was the son of a baker and attended a course of humanist studies in Paris. He went on to study law at Bourges and came under the influence of Reformation teaching. On his return to Trier his beliefs came into conflict with those of the local clergy.

In 1560 he was invited by Frederick III, Elector Palatine to teach at the University of Heidelberg. After the Elector's death his son Louis VI, Elector Palatine, who was strongly Lutheran in conviction, attempted to turn the school away from the Reformed doctrine of the Heidelberg catechism. Olevianus was banned from teaching but he was able to move to Berleburg. There, in 1578, he published a commentary on the Epistle to the Galatians, with a preface by Theodore Beza.

Olevianus published several works on the Covenant of Grace. In 1584 he moved to the County of Nassau and became rector of Herborn Academy. He died in 1587 surrounded by friends and supporters and was buried in Herborn. On his deathbed he was asked "Are you undoubtedly sure of your salvation, as you taught others constantly?" His reply was "Most certain!"
