= Covenant theology =

Protestant biblical interpretive framework

Covenant theology (also known as covenantalism, federal theology, or federalism) is a biblical theology, a conceptual overview and interpretive framework for understanding the overall structure of the Bible. It is often distinguished from dispensational theology, a competing form of biblical theology. It uses the theological concept of a covenant as an organizing principle for Christian theology. In the words of Daniel R. Hyde,

What unifies all the act in the "greatest drama ever staged" is that they are expressed in the Bible through the concept of covenant.

The standard form of covenant theology views the history of God's dealings with mankind, from Creation to Fall to Redemption to Consummation, under the framework of three overarching theological covenants: those of works, grace, and redemption.

These three covenants are called theological because they are thought of as theologically implicit, describing and summarizing a wealth of scriptural data. Historical Reformed systems of thought treat classical covenant theology not merely as a point of doctrine or as a central dogma, but as the structure by which the biblical text organizes itself. Covenant theology is upheld by Christians of the Reformed tradition, including the Continental Reformed, Presbyterian, Congregationalist, Baptist (specifically Particular Baptists), and Reformed Anglican traditions. The most well-known form of Covenant Theology is associated with Presbyterians and comes from the Westminster Confession of Faith. A variant of the Westminster form is the Baptist federalism, also called Baptist covenant theology, a credobaptist version of the paedobaptist Presbyterian covenant theology. It is usually associated with the Particular Baptist strand and the Second London Confession of Faith of 1689. Methodist hermeneutics traditionally use a variation of this, known as Wesleyan covenant theology, which is consistent with Arminian soteriology.

As a framework for Biblical interpretation, covenant theology stands in contrast to dispensationalism in regard to the relationship between the Old Covenant (with national Israel) and the New Covenant (with the house of Israel [Jeremiah 31:31] in Christ's blood). Detractors of covenant theology often (misleadingly) refer to it as "supersessionism" or "replacement theology", due to the perception that it teaches that God has abandoned the promises made to the Jews and has replaced the Jews with Christians as His chosen people on the Earth. However, covenant theologians deny that God has abandoned His promises to Israel, but see the fulfillment of the promises to Israel in the person and the work of the Messiah, Jesus of Nazareth, who established the church in organic continuity with Israel, not as a separate replacement entity. Many covenant theologians have also seen a distinct future promise of gracious restoration for unregenerate Israel.

== Theological covenants ==
God's covenantal relationship with God's creation is not made automatically or out of necessity. Rather, God chooses to establish the connection as a covenant, wherein the terms of the relationship are set down by God alone according to God's own will.

=== Covenant of works ===
The covenant of works (Latin: foedus operum, also called the covenant of life) was made in the Garden of Eden between God and Adam who represented all humankind as a federal head (Romans 5:12–21). God offered Adam a perfect and perpetual life if he did not violate God's single commandment, but warned that death would follow if he disobeyed that commandment. Adam broke the covenant, thus standing condemned as representative for all humankind.

The term foedus operum was first used by Dudley Fenner in 1585, though Zacharias Ursinus had mentioned a covenant of creation in 1562. The concept of the covenant of works became commonly recognized in Reformed theology by 1590, though not by all; some members of the Westminster Assembly disagreed with the teaching in the 1640s. John Calvin writes of a probationary period for Adam, a promise of life for obedience, and the federal headship of Adam, but he does not write of a covenant of works. It is not referred to as a covenant in the opening chapters of Genesis, but is referred to as a covenant in Hosea 6:7, "But like Adam, they transgressed the covenant; there, they dealt faithlessly with Me."

==== Adamic covenant ====
Covenant theology first sees a covenant of works administered with Adam in the Garden of Eden. Upon Adam's failure, God established the covenant of grace in the promised seed Genesis 3:15, and shows His redeeming care in clothing Adam and Eve in garments of skin—perhaps picturing the first instance of animal sacrifice. The specific covenants after the fall of Adam are seen as administered under the overarching theological covenant of grace.

==== Mosaic covenant ====
There is debate among the Reformed if the Mosaic covenant was in some way a republication of the covenant of works. The view that there was such a republication was advocated by Thomas Boston, Edward Fisher, Meredith Kline and John Owen.

=== Covenant of grace ===
The covenant of grace promises eternal life for all people who have faith in Christ. God also promises the Holy Spirit to the elect to give them willingness and ability to believe. Christ is the substitutionary covenantal representative fulfilling the covenant of works on their behalf, in both the positive requirements of righteousness and its negative penal consequences (commonly described as His active and passive obedience). It is the historical expression of the eternal covenant of redemption. Genesis 3:15, with the promise of a "seed" of the woman who would crush the serpent's head, is usually identified as the historical inauguration for the covenant of grace.

The covenant of grace runs through the Old and New Testaments, and is the same in substance under both the law and gospel, though there is some difference in the administration. Under the law, the sacrifices, prophesies, and other types and ordinances of the Jews signified Christ, and men were justified by their faith in Him just as they would be under the gospel. These were done away with the coming of Christ, and replaced with the much simpler sacraments of baptism and the Lord's Supper.

Reformed orthodox theologians taught that the covenant was primarily unilateral or monopleuric (Latin: foedus monopleuron) on the part of God, but also entailed conditions on the part of men. The conditions of the covenant of grace were spoken of as assumptive and confirmatory rather than duties required in order to receive the covenant. The covenant was therefore also bilateral or dipleuric (Latin: foedus dipleuron). Scholars have challenged the notion in contemporary scholarship that Genevan Reformers taught a unilateral and unconditional covenant relationship whilst the Rhineland Reformers taught a bilateral contractual relationship. Mark Jones, Richard Muller, J. Mark Beach, and John Von Rohr have argued that Leonard Trinterud's identification of the apparent polarisation between Calvin and Olevianus on the one hand and Luther, Bullinger, and the Puritans on the other hand is a faulty reading of history.

==== Noahic covenant ====
The Noahic covenant is found in Genesis 8:20–9:17. Although redemption motifs are prominent as Noah and his family are delivered from the judgment waters, the narrative of the flood plays on the creation motifs of Genesis 1 as de-creation and re-creation. The formal terms of the covenant itself more reflect a reaffirmation of the universal created order, than a particular redemptive promise.

==== Abrahamic covenant ====
The Abrahamic covenant is found in Genesis chapters 12, 15, and 17. In contrast with the covenants made with Adam or Noah which were universal in scope, this covenant was with a particular people. Abraham is promised a seed and a land, although he would not see its fruition within his own lifetime. The Book of Hebrews explains that he was looking to a better and heavenly land, a city with foundations, whose builder and architect is God (11:8–16). The Apostle Paul writes that the promised seed refers in particular to Christ (Galatians 3:16).

The Abrahamic covenant is:

1. Exclusive: it is only for Abraham and his descendants. Genesis 17:7
2. Everlasting: it is not replaced by any later covenant. Genesis 17:7
3. Accepted by faith. Genesis 15:6
4. The external sign of entering into the Abrahamic covenant was circumcision. Genesis 17:10, but it has to be matched by an internal change, the circumcision of the heart. Jeremiah 4:4, Philippians 3:3
5. According to Paul, since the Abrahamic covenant is eternal, the followers of Christ are "children of Abraham" and therefore part of this covenant through faith. "Understand, then, that those who have faith are children of Abraham." Galatians 3:7
6. According to covenant theology, Paul makes it clear that baptism is the external sign of faith in Christ ("…you were baptized into Christ…"), and that through faith in Christ the believer is part of the Abrahamic covenant ("Abraham's seed"). This provides the basis for the doctrine that baptism is the New Testament sign of God's covenant with Abraham, Galatians 3:27. Non-covenantal theology does not teach that the Abrahamic covenant is inherited by gentiles, and thus presents a different view of baptism.
7. Romans 11 teaches disobedient Jews are broken off of the family tree of Abraham. It is only after the full number of the Gentiles have been grafted into Abraham's family tree that God will pour out His mercy on the people of Israel.

==== Mosaic covenant ====
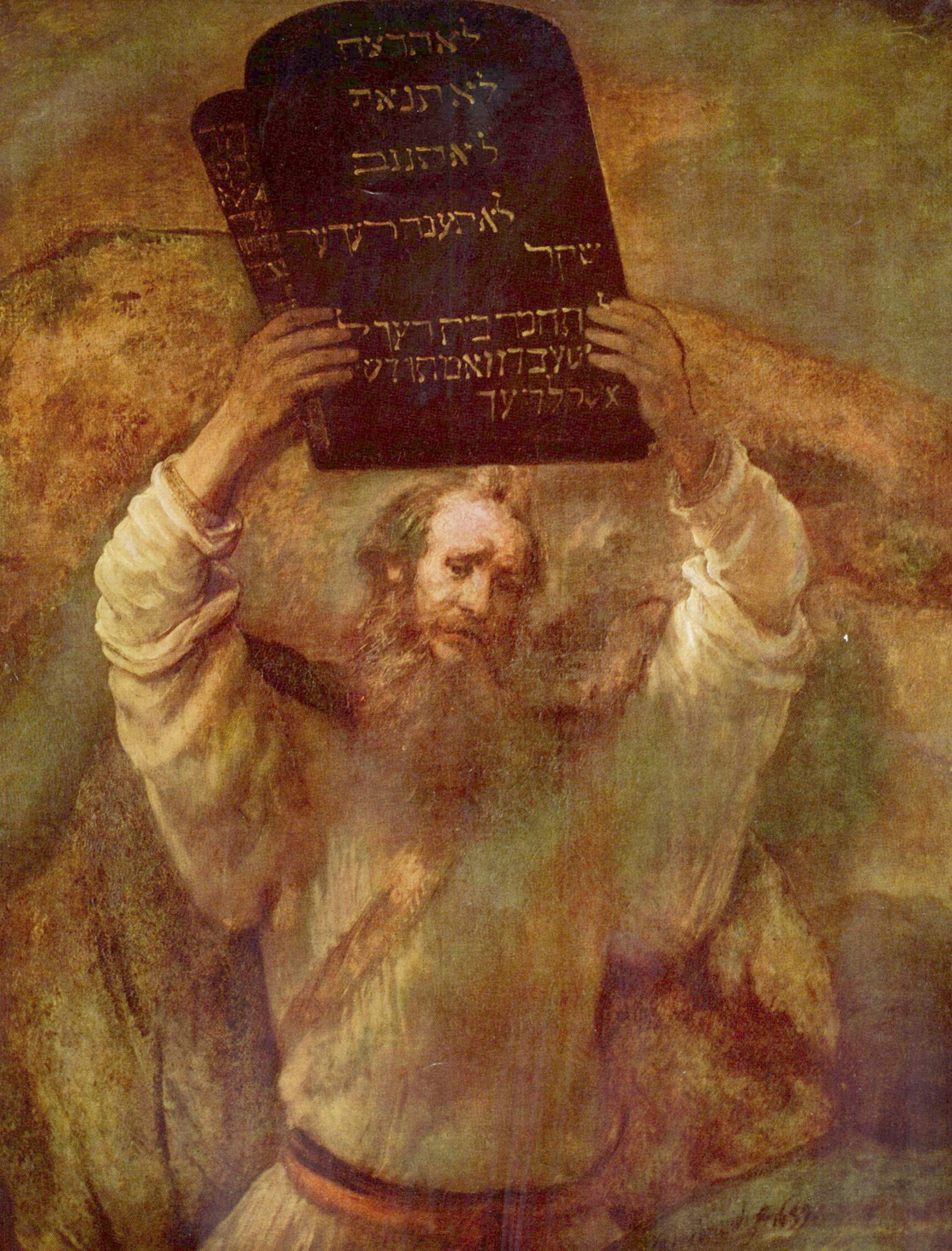
Moses with the Ten Commandments by Rembrandt (1659)

The Mosaic covenant, found in Exodus 19–24 and the book of Deuteronomy, expands on the Abrahamic promise of a people and a land. Repeatedly mentioned is the promise of the Lord, "I will be your God and you will be my people" (cf. Exodus 6:7, Leviticus 26:12), particularly displayed as His glory-presence comes to dwell in the midst of the people. This covenant is the one most in view when referring to the Old Covenant.

Although it is a gracious covenant beginning with God's redemptive action (cf. Exodus 20:1–2), a layer of law is prominent. Concerning this aspect of the Mosaic Covenant, Charles Hodge makes three points in his Commentary on Second Corinthians: (1) The Law of Moses was in first place a reenactment of the covenant of works; viewed this way, it is the ministration of condemnation and death. (2) It was also a national covenant, giving national blessings based on national obedience; in this way it was purely legal. (3) In the sacrificial system, it points to the Gospel of salvation through a mediator.

===== Moabite covenant =====
Some commentators, like John Gill, see in the passage that begins in Deuteronomy 29:1 a distinct and gracious covenant, involving circumcision of the heart, which foresees the embrace of the Gentiles and which is looked back upon as distinct from the Mosaic Covenant by the Apostle Paul in Romans 10:6–8.

===== Levite covenant =====
Other commentators, such as Douglas Van Dorn, recognize a separate priestly covenant, independent of the Mosaic covenant (which he takes as a prophetic covenant). In taken with the Davidic (kingly) covenant, this represents the three offices of Christ. Van Dorn argues this case on the basis of Nehemiah 13:29 which refers to "the covenant of the priesthood and the Levites", Malachi 2:8 who speaks of "the covenant of Levi", and Jeremiah 33:21 who points to the "covenant with the Levitical priests". Van Dorn argues that the covenant document for this covenant is the book of Leviticus itself.

==== Davidic covenant ====
The Davidic covenant is found in 2 Samuel 7. The Lord proclaims that He will build a house and lineage for David, establishing His kingdom and throne forever. This covenant is appealed to as God preserves David's descendants despite their wickedness (cf. 1 Kings 11:26–39, 15:1–8; 2 Kings 8:19, 19:32–34), although it did not stop judgment from finally arriving (compare 2 Kings 21:7, 23:26–27; Jeremiah 13:12–14). Among the prophets of the exile, there is hope of restoration under a Davidic king who will bring peace and justice (cf. Book of Ezekiel 37:24–28).

==== New Covenant ====
The New Covenant is anticipated with the hopes of the Davidic messiah, and most explicitly predicted by the prophet Jeremiah (Jeremiah 31:31–33). At the Last Supper, Jesus alludes to this prophecy, as well as to prophecies such as Isaiah 49:8, when he says that the cup of the Passover meal is "the New Covenant in [His] blood." This use of the Old Testament typology is developed further in the Epistle to the Hebrews (esp. chs. 7–10). Jesus is the last Adam and Israel's hope and consolation: he is the fulfillment of the law and the prophets (Matthew 5:17–18). He is the prophet greater than Jonah (Matthew 12:41), and the Son over the house where Moses was a servant (Hebrews 3:5–6), leading His people to the heavenly promised land. He is the high priest greater than Aaron, offering up Himself as the perfect sacrifice once for all (Hebrews 9:12, 26). He is the king greater than Solomon (Matthew 12:42), ruling forever on David's throne (Luke 1:32). The term "New Testament" comes from the Latin translation of the Greek New Covenant and is most often used for the collection of books in the Bible, but can also refer to the New Covenant as a theological concept.

The covenant of grace became the basis for all future covenants that God made with mankind such as with Noah (Genesis 6, 9), with Abraham (Genesis 12, 15, 17), with Moses (Exodus 19–24), with David (2 Samuel 7), and finally in the New Covenant founded and fulfilled in Christ. Ultimately, God's covenants are consummated in the new creation (Revelation 21-22). These individual covenants are called the biblical covenants because they are explicitly described in the Bible. Under the covenantal overview of the Bible, submission to God's rule and living in accordance with His moral law (expressed concisely in the Ten Commandments) is a response to grace – never something which can earn God's acceptance (legalism). Even in His giving of the Ten Commandments, God introduces His law by reminding the Israelites that he is the one who brought them out of slavery in Egypt (grace).

=== Subservient Covenant ===
Moses Amyraut and few others proposed that the Mosaic Covenant is a third kind of substance, called the Subservient Covenant. As opposed to most covenant theologians, Moses Amyraut did not hold that the two substances are only the "Covenant of Grace" and the "Covenant of Works".

=== Covenant of redemption ===
The covenant of redemption is the eternal agreement within the Godhead in which the Father appointed the Son through the Spirit to become incarnate, suffer, and die as a federal head of mankind to make an atonement for their sin. In return, the Father promised to raise Christ from the dead, glorify Him, and give Him a people. Two of the earliest theologians to write about the covenant of redemption were Johannes Cocceius and John Owen, though Caspar Olevian had hinted at the idea before them. This covenant is not mentioned in the Westminster Standards, but the idea of a contractual relationship between the Father and Son is present. Scriptural support for such a covenant may be found in Psalms 2 and 110, Isaiah 53, Philippians 2:5–11 and Revelation 5:9–10. Some covenant theologians have denied the intra-Trinitarian covenant of redemption, or have questioned the notion of the Son's works leading to the reward of gaining a people for God, or have challenged the covenantal nature of this arrangement.

== Covenantal signs and seals ==
In Reformed theology, a sacrament is usually defined as a sign and seal of the covenant of grace. Since covenant theology today is mainly Reformed in its outlook, proponents view Baptism and the Lord's Supper as the only two sacraments in this sense, which are sometimes called "church ordinances". Along with the preached word, they are identified as an ordinary means of grace for salvation. The benefits of these rites do not occur from participating in the rite itself (ex opere operato), but through the power of the Holy Spirit as they are received by faith.

Sometimes covenantal theologians define sacrament to include signs and seals of the covenant of works. The Garden of Eden, the tree of life, the tree of knowledge of good and evil, and the Sabbath are commonly considered to be the sacraments of the covenant of works.

=== Lord's Supper ===
The Eucharist or the Lord's Supper was instituted by Jesus at a Passover meal, to which he gave a radical reinterpretation. The festival of Passover commemorates the Israelites' deliverance from Egypt – specifically, how the lamb's blood which God commanded them to place on their door posts caused the Angel of Death to "pass over" their dwellings, so that their firstborn might be spared from the final plague. The New Testament writers understand this event typologically: as the lamb's blood saved the Israelites from the plague, so Jesus' substitutionary death saves God's New Covenant people from being judged for their sins. Calvinism has generally viewed the Eucharist as a mysterious participation in the Real Presence of Christ mediated by the Holy Spirit (that is, real spiritual presence or pneumatic presence). This differs from Roman Catholicism and Lutheranism which believe in the Real Presence as an actual bodily presence of Christ, as well as from the Zwinglian position that the supper is only a memorial commemoration.

=== Baptism ===
Paedobaptist Covenant theologians argue that the Abrahamic Covenant is still in force, and that God's covenantal promise "to be your God and the God of your descendants after you" still stands for every believer. The argument that the administration of all (other) Biblical covenants, including the New Covenant, include a principle of familial, corporate inclusion, or "generational succession" is therefore of secondary importance to whether infants should be baptized or not. The familial nature of the Abrahamic covenant is undisputed. Genesis 17 "You are to undergo circumcision, and it will be the sign of the covenant between me and you. 12 For the generations to come every male among you who is eight days old must be circumcised, including those born in your household or bought with money from a foreigner—those who are not your offspring. 13 Whether born in your household or bought with your money, they must be circumcised."

In the Acts of the Apostles 2:38–39, the promise is seen to extend to the children of believers as it always was in the Abrahamic Covenant. The Biblical covenants between God and man include signs and seals that visibly represent the realities behind the covenants. These visible signs and symbols of God's covenant redemption are administered in a corporate manner (for instance, to households—see Acts 16:14–15; 16:31–34), not in an exclusively individualistic manner.

Baptism is considered to be the visible New Testament sign of entrance into the Abrahamic Covenant and therefore may be administered individually to new believers making a public profession of faith. Paedobaptists further believe this extends corporately to the households of believers which typically would include children, or individually to children or infants of believing parents (see Infant baptism). In this view, baptism is thus seen as the functional replacement and sacramental equivalent of the Abrahamic rite of circumcision (Colossians 2:11–14) and symbolizes the internal cleansing from sin, among other things.

Credobaptist Covenant theologians (such as the Baptists Benjamin Keach, John Gill, and Charles Spurgeon) hold that baptism is only for those who can understand and profess their faith, and they argue that the regulative principle of worship, which many paedobaptists also advocate and which states that elements of worship (including baptism) must be based on explicit commands of Scripture, is violated by infant baptism. Furthermore, because the New Covenant is described in Jeremiah 31:31–34 as a time when all who were members of it would have the law written on their hearts and would know God, Baptist Covenant Theologians believe only those who are born again are members of the New Covenant.

== History ==
Huldrych Zwingli and Johannes Oecolampadius were among the first reformers to speak of God's salvation economy under the categories of a covenant of works and a covenant of grace. John Calvin (Institutes 2:9–11), like Heinrich Bullinger (A Brief Exposition of the One and Eternal Testament or Covenant of God), focused on the continuity of the covenant of grace, but taught the substance of what became classic covenant theology in terms of Law and Gospel. Early post-reformation writings, including Zacharius Ursinus (1534–1583) in Commentary on the Heidelberg Catechism (published posthumously, 1591), Caspar Olevianus (1536–1587) in Concerning the Substance of the Covenant of Grace between God and the Elect (De substantia foederis gratuiti inter deum et electos, 1585), and Scottish Theologian Robert Rollock (1555–1599) in A Treatise of our Effectual Calling (Tractatus de vocatione efficaci, 1597), developed the covenant of works and covenant of grace scheme along the lines of the law-gospel distinction.

Classical statements of covenant theology can be found in the British Westminster Confession of Faith (particularly chap. 7, 8, 19), as well as in the writings of English theologians such as John Owen (1616–1683), Biblical Theology, and An Exposition of the Epistle to the Hebrews. The classical statements among 17th century continental theologians include Johannes Cocceius (c. 1603–1669) in The Doctrine of the Covenant and Testament of God (Summa doctrinae de foedere et testamento dei, 1648), Francis Turretin (1623–1687) in his Institutes of Elenctic Theology, and Hermann Witsius (1636–1708) in The Economy of the Covenants Between God and Man. It may also be seen in the writings of Jonathan Edwards (1703–58) in Collected Writings of Jonathan Edwards, Vol 2, Banner of Truth edition, p. 950.

In the United States, the Princeton theologians (Charles Hodge, A. A. Hodge, B. B. Warfield, Geerhardus Vos, and J. Gresham Machen) and, in the Netherlands, Herman Bavinck followed the main lines of the classic view, teaching the Covenant of Redemption, the Covenant of Works (Law), and the Covenant of Grace (Gospel).

Recent well-known covenant theologians in the United States include Michael Horton, J. Ligon Duncan III, Meredith G. Kline, J. I. Packer, Richard L. Pratt Jr., O. Palmer Robertson and R. C. Sproul. This system is taught at schools such as Covenant Theological Seminary, Greenville Presbyterian Theological Seminary, Knox Theological Seminary, Reformed Theological Seminary, Westminster Theological Seminary, and Westminster Seminary California.

== Developments ==
There have been recent developments in classical covenant theology by Reformed (Calvinist) pastors and theologians. Wesleyan covenant theology, a variation of classical covenant theology, was designed by John Wesley, the founder of Methodism.

=== Classical covenant theology ===
==== Covenant structure ====
Meredith G. Kline did pioneering work in the field of Biblical studies, in the 1960s and 1970s, building on prior work by George E. Mendenhall, by identifying the form of the covenant with the common Suzerain–Vassal treaties of the Ancient Near East in the 2nd millennium BC. One of the highlights of his work has been the comparison of the Mosaic Covenant with the Hittite Suzerainty Treaty formula. A suggested comparison of the treaty structure with the book of Deuteronomy is as follows:

- Preamble (cf. Deuteronomy 1:1–4)
- Historical prologue (cf. Deuteronomy 1:5–3:29)
- Stipulations (cf. Deuteronomy 4–26)
- Document clause (cf. Deuteronomy 27)
- List of gods as witnesses (notably lacking in Deuteronomy)
- Sanctions: curses and blessings (cf. Deuteronomy 28; 31–34).

Kline has argued that comparisons between the suzerain-vassal treaties and royal grants of the Ancient Near East provide insight in highlighting certain distinctive features of the Mosaic covenant as a law covenant, in contrast with the other historic post-Fall covenants. Many who have embraced Kline's insights have still insisted, however, in accordance with the Westminster Confession of Faith, that the Mosaic covenant was fundamentally an administration of the Covenant of Grace.

==== Contemporary revisions and controversy ====
A number of major 20th-century covenant theologians including Karl Barth, Klaas Schilder, and John Murray have departed from the traditional recognition of a covenant of works in classical covenant theology to develop a monocovenantal scheme subsuming everything under one Covenant of Grace. The focus of all biblical covenants is then on grace and faith. This has not been developed consistently between the various theologians. For example, Barth, influential in the mainline churches and in certain evangelical circles, conceived of grace as the fundamental reality underlying all of creation. Influential among more conservative Calvinist churches, Murray acknowledged the traditional concept of a works principle as a condition for life with Adam in the Garden of Eden, comparing Adam's works to the works of Christ. He disputed its label as a covenant, however, preferring to call this arrangement the Adamic administration.

===== Shepherd controversy =====
At Westminster Theological Seminary in the late 1970s, Norman Shepherd, a professor of systematic theology was dismissed due to controversy over his teaching on justification. His views involved a reconfiguration of covenant theology that went beyond those of Murray, his predecessor. Shepherd denied any notion of a works or merit principle, leading to a denial of the imputation of Christ's active obedience to the believer. He argued that Jesus' own justification was due to His faith and obedience. In the same way then, the believer must be justified before God by faith and obedience. Shepherd's followers claim that the Covenant of Works between Adam and God in the Garden of Eden was not originally part of covenant theology, following John Murray's observation that a covenant of works at creation does not receive explicit mention in early confessions such as the French Confession (1559), the Scots Confession (1560), the Belgic Confession (1561), the Thirty-Nine Articles (1562), the Heidelberg Catechism (1563), and the Second Helvetic Confession (1566).

Some of Shepherd's critics contend that the concept of a works principle distinct from a Covenant of Grace is evident in the commentaries and dogmatic works of the earliest covenant theologians, particularly in the distinction made between Law and Gospel (for instance, Zacharias Ursinus, Commentary on the Heidelberg Catechism). There is also explicit articulation of a Covenant of Works in the writings of those such as Olevianus and Rollock. Additionally, defenders of the merit-based view argue that the concept of this works principle operating in the pre-Fall state in the Garden of Eden as a covenant is present in the early confessions even if the Covenant of Works is not explicitly named. Examples include Belgic Confession, article 14, which speaks of Adam having received and transgressed the "commandment of life"; or Heidelberg Catechism, Question and Answer 6 affirming the goodness of man in creation. The later Westminster Confession of Faith (1646) explicitly names the Covenant of Works which Adam transgressed (7.2; 19.1), and which "continues to be a perfect rule of righteousness" in the form of the moral law (19.2, 3).

===== Kline =====
In opposition to the modern revisers, Meredith Kline reemphasized the idea of a covenant of works as expressed in the Westminster Confession of Faith 7.2 as a means to protect a gospel of grace. Kline wrote:

If meritorious works could not be predicated of Jesus Christ as second Adam, then obviously there would be no meritorious achievement to be imputed to His people as the ground of their justification-approbation. The gospel invitation would turn out to be a mirage. We who have believed on Christ would still be under condemnation. The gospel truth, however, is that Christ has performed the one act of righteousness and by His obedience of the one the many are made righteous (Rom 5:18, 19) .... Underlying Christ's mediatorship of a covenant of grace for the salvation of believers is His earthly fulfillment, through meritorious obedience, of His heavenly covenant of works with the Father. ... What begins as a rejection of works ends up as an attack, however unintentional, on the biblical message of saving grace.

Kline, Michael Horton, and others have sought to uphold the distinction of two sorts of covenant traditions: one based on merit, earned by obedience to law (works), and the other on promise (grace). While the consensus in Calvinist theology is that works are antithetical to grace as the means of justification, differences emerge in attempts to describe this antithesis.

On the one hand, Calvinist theologians were more in line with Kline tend to say that works are ultimately the basis for grace, since God requires perfect upholding of the law for heavenly reward. Since this is understood to be an impossible task for the corrupted sinner, it is Christ who perfectly obeyed the law in fulfillment of the covenant of works. Jesus, earning the reward, graciously bestows it to His people (cf. Luke 22:29). For example, R. C. Sproul writes, "Man's relationship to God in creation was based on works. What Adam failed to achieve, Christ, the second Adam, succeeded in achieving. Ultimately the only way one can be justified is by works." The sinner is thus saved by Christ's works and not his own. Right standing before God is then due to an alien or imputed righteousness received by faith, not by personal faithfulness which is the fruition of salvation and not its ground.

On the other hand, Calvinist theologians more in line with Murray tend to say that works were never meant to be the basis for grace, but that grace precedes the call for obedience. Consequently, works are the necessary response to grace and not the precondition for it. For example, Michael Williams writes, "The function of law within Scripture is the maintenance of relationship, not the creation of relationship. Legal obligation is not the precondition for life and relationship. Rather, life and relationship form the necessary environment for obligation." While this view still affirms the necessity of the merit of Christ, it departs from Kline's construal of merit as a fundamental principle of the covenant of works.

=== Wesleyan covenant theology ===
Methodism maintains the superstructure of classical covenant theology, but being Arminian in soteriology, it discards the "predestinarian template of Reformed theology that was part and parcel of its historical development." The main difference between Wesleyan covenant theology and classical covenant theology is as follows:

The point of divergence is Wesley’s conviction that not only is the inauguration of the covenant of grace coincidental with the fall, but so is the termination of the covenant of works. This conviction is of supreme importance for Wesley in facilitating an Arminian adaptation of covenant theology—first, by reconfiguring the reach of the covenant of grace; and second, by disallowing any notion that there is a reinvigoration of the covenant of works beyond the fall.

As such, in the Wesleyan-Arminian view, only Adam and Eve were under the covenant of works, while on the other hand, all of their progeny are under the covenant of grace. With Mosaic Law belonging to the covenant of grace, all of humanity is brought "within the reach of the provisions of that covenant." This belief is reflected in John Wesley's sermon Righteousness of Faith: "The Apostle does not here oppose the covenant given by Moses, to the covenant given by Christ. …But it is the covenant of grace, which God, through Christ, hath established with men in all ages". The covenant of grace was therefore administered through "promises, prophecies, sacrifices, and at last by circumcision" during the patriarchal ages and through "the paschal lamb, the scape goat, [and] the priesthood of Aaron" under Mosaic Law. Under the Gospel, the covenant of grace is mediated through the greater sacraments, baptism and the Lord's Supper. The Methodist theologian Richard Watson, with regard to the Eucharist, stated:

This covenant, the blood of Christ, that is, the pouring forth of His blood as a sacrificial victim, at once procured and ratified; so that it stands firm to all truly penitent and contrite spirits who believe in Him: and of this great truth, the Lord's Supper was the instituted sign and seal; and he who in faith drinks of the cup, having reference to its signification, that blood of Christ which confirms to true believers the whole covenant of grace, is assured thereby of its faithfulness and permanence, and derives to Himself the fulness of its blessings.

Wesleyan covenant theology is also seen in the Methodist theology of baptism, e.g. when introducing this sacrament, United Methodist Book of Worship teaches: "The Baptismal Covenant is God's word to us, proclaiming our adoption by grace, and our word to God, promising our response of faith and love. Those within the covenant constitute the community we call the Church". Watson explicates Wesleyan-Arminian theology regarding baptism:

But as the entrance into the Jewish Church was by circumcision, so the entrance into the Christian Church is by baptism. Hence its administration is here prescribed to those who are made disciples, and as such disposed to become formally the members of Christ's Church. Hence it derives its federal or covenant character, and is rightly considered as a mystery or sacrament. Of the blessings of this covenant it is the sign, holding forth the washing away of sin, and the pouring out of the Holy Ghost; and it is the seal, inasmuch as, being administered under the command of Christ, it is a constant pledge of His unchangeably gracious intentions to those that believe and are baptized; while our submission to this rite is that act by which we accept and make ourselves parties to this covenant of grace and salvation, claiming its blessing, and binding ourselves to fulfil its conditions.

In Wesleyan covenant theology, the source of the covenant of grace is Jesus Christ, as "the prophet, priest, and king, the head and saviour of His church, the heir of all things and judge of the world."

As with the Reformed view, the founder of the movement, John Wesley held that the moral law, which is contained in the Ten Commandments, continues to stand today:

Every part of this law must remain in force upon all mankind in all ages, as not depending either on time or place, nor on any other circumstances liable to change; but on the nature of God and the nature of man, and their unchangeable relation to each other

Wesleyan covenant theology, unlike Reformed classical covenant theology, emphasizes that though God initiates a covenant with humanity, humans are given the free will to follow Him, and "God is always the innocent party in cases where salvation is lost".

When persons become professing members of a Methodist connexion, they personally bind themselves to a covenant with God and the Church through the making of vows. On New Year's Eve, congregations belonging to various Methodist connexions, such as the United Methodist Church, Free Methodist Church and Pilgrim Holiness Church, conduct a watchnight service in the form of the Covenant Renewal Service, so that Methodist believers can personally renew their covenant with the Creator every year; this liturgy is traditionally preceded by prayer and fasting.

=== Baptist covenant theology ===
The most well-known form of Covenant theology is associated with Presbyterians (paedobaptists) and comes from the Westminster Confession of Faith. However, another form of covenant theology is held to by some baptists; it is called Baptist covenant theology or 1689 Federalism, to distinguish it from Westminster Federalism. It is usually associated with the Particular Baptist strand of Baptists, and comes from the Second London Baptist Confession of Faith, published in 1689. The principal difference between these two variants of covenant theology is their understanding of the Covenant of Grace.

Standard Westminster covenant theology sees the Covenant of Grace beginning with the Fall in Genesis 3, and continuing through the Old Covenant and the New Covenant, under the same "substance" but different "administrations". The Covenant of Grace, the Old Covenant, and the New Covenant, all have the same substance and only differ in the fact that the Old Covenant and the New Covenant constitute two separate administrations of that single substance. In contrast, 1689 Federalism does not see the Covenant of Grace as beginning with the Fall in Genesis 3. Instead, the Covenant of Grace begins with the establishing of the New Covenant at the Cross; 1689 Federalism sees the New Covenant and the Covenant of Grace as the same thing. The Old Covenant is seen as the foreshadowing and anticipation for the Covenant of Grace, not an administration of the Covenant of Grace; the Old Covenant is a series of promises that point towards the New Covenant, and will not be realized until that point. However, Covenantal Baptists are careful to still specify that, "this New Covenant of Grace was extant and effectual under the Old Testament ... How can we affirm this while at the same time holding that the New Covenant of Grace was not established until the death of Christ? In the same way that we can affirm that Abraham and other OT saints were covered by the blood of Christ prior to Christ's actual death on the cross (2LBCF 8.6)."

The Westminster Confession of Faith outlines this "one substance, two administrations" understanding by specifying that under the Old Covenant, the covenant was "administered by promises, prophecies, sacrifices, circumcision, the paschal lamb, and other types and ordinances", while under the New Covenant, the covenant is administered by "the preaching of the Word, and the administration of the sacraments" so that "there are not, therefore, two covenants of grace differing in substance, but one and the same under various dispensations". In contrast, 1689 Federalism condenses this all down to say that the Covenant of Grace was revealed progressively over Old Testament history after Genesis 3 "by further steps, until the full discovery thereof was completed in the New Testament."

Since the Covenant of Works and the Covenant of Grace are the only redemptive covenants, stemming from the Covenant of Redemption, salvation is only possible through the Covenant of Grace, as in the covenant theology of standard Westminster pedobaptist federalism. Between The Fall in Genesis 3 and the New Covenant are several other covenants, in particular the covenant of Abraham, the covenant of Moses, and the covenant of David. But these covenants are "works and law" covenants and not "redemptive" covenants, since they exist only for specific earthly purposes in space and time, such as to allow Israel to live in the promised land under the conditions given in the covenant. Though their substance is different from the Covenant of Grace, and they are therefore not part of that covenant, they do point to the promises in that covenant. They do this by drawing on typology, and as such consist of "types" and "antitypes", where the "type" is the explicit purpose of that covenant, but the "antitype" is the way in which that covenant points towards the promises of the Covenant of Grace through the New Covenant. Salvation was therefore possible for people under the Old Covenant through the Covenant of Grace if they had saving faith in these promises.

Covenant theology under Westminster Federalism allows paedobaptism since it sees a greater continuity between the Old Covenant and the New Covenant. Covenant theology under Baptist Federalism, in contrast, supports credobaptism because it sees a greater discontunity between the Old and New covenants. Because the Old Covenant was not an administration of the same Covenant of Grace as the New Covenant, its "sacrament" of circumcision cannot be made the equivalent of the sacrament of baptism. Baptism is seen as a part of the Covenant of Grace in the New Covenant; circumcision is seen as a part of the Old Covenant, which was only a shadow of the Covenant of Grace and not its actual substance.

== See also ==
- Biblical law in Christianity
- Covenant renewal worship
- Federal Vision
- New Covenant theology

== Bibliography ==
- Denault, Pascal. The Distinctiveness of Baptist Covenant Theology.
- Gill, John. "Deuteronomy Chapter 29". Exposition of the Old and New Testament. Sacred Texts.
- Hyde, Daniel R. "Covenant Theology 101: Covenant Breakers and the Covenant Keeper."
  - "Covenant: God's Story," in Welcome to a Reformed Church: A Guide for Pilgrims (Orlando: Reformation Trust, 2010), 51–69. ISBN 978-1-56769-203-7
- Jones, Mark (2011). "The 'Old' Covenant". In Haykin, Michael A. G.; Jones, Mark (eds.). Drawn into Controversie: Reformed Theological Diversity and Debates Within Seventeenth-century British Puritanism. Göttingen, Germany: Vandenhoeck & Ruprecht..
- Letham, Robert (2009). The Westminster Assembly: Reading Its Theology in Historical Context. "The Westminster Assembly and the Reformed Faith" series. Phillipsburg, New Jersey: P&R Publishing. ISBN 978-0-87552-612-6.
- Nave, Orville J. (2024) [1905]. "Covenant". Nave's Topical Bible Concordance. Topical Bible Publishing – via Naves-Topical-Bible.com (StudyLamp Software).
- Rodes, Stanley J. (2014). From Faith to Faith: John Wesley's Covenant Theology and the Way of Salvation. James Clarke & Co. ISBN 978-0-22790220-2.

=== Historical documents ===
- Westminster Confession of Faith (1647), Chapter VII, Chapter VIII, Chapter XIX and Chapter XXVII
- Helvetic Consensus (1675)
- Westminster Larger Catechism
- 1689 Baptist Confession

=== Advocates ===
- Ball, John (2006) [1645]. A Treatise of the Covenant of Grace. Dingwall: Peter & Rachel Reynolds. ISBN 1-84685-278-1 – via Internet Archive.
- Faber, Jelle (1996). "American Secession Theologians on Covenant and Baptism". In Schilder, Klaas (ed.). Extra-scriptural Binding: A New Danger [i.e., to Dutch Reformed theological confessionalism]. Neerlandia, Alta, Canada: Inheritance. ISBN 0-921100-46-9.
- Hahn, Scott (1998). A Father Who Keeps His Promises: God's Covenant Love in Scripture. Cincinnati, Ohio: Servant Books. p. 294. ISBN 978-0-89283-829-5.
- Hodge, Charles. Commentary on Romans 5:12-21 – via Reformed.org. A central passage for federal theology.
- Hodge, Charles. "The Covenant of Works". Systematic Theology. Vol. 2. Archived from the original on 21 May 2018.
- Hodge, Charles. "The Covenant of Grace". Systematic Theology. Vol. 3. Archived from the original on 22 June 2017.
- Horton, Michael (2006). God of Promise: Introducing Covenant Theology. Grand Rapids: Baker Books. ISBN 0-8010-1289-9.
- Hyde, Daniel R. "Covenant Theology 101: Covenant Breakers and the Covenant Keeper."
  - "Covenant: God's Story," in Welcome to a Reformed Church: A Guide for Pilgrims (Orlando: Reformation Trust, 2010), 51–69. ISBN 978-1-56769-203-7
- Kline, Meredith G. (2000). Kingdom Prologue: Genesis Foundations for a Covenantal Worldview. Overland Park: Two Age. ISBN 0-9706418-0-X. See in particular the chapters: "What is a Covenant?", and "Two Adams, Two Covenants of Works".
- Malone, Fred (2003). The Baptism of Disciples Alone: A Covenantal Argument for Credobaptism Versus Paedobaptism. Founders Press. ISBN 0-9713361-3-X.
- Murray, John (1982). "Covenant Theology". Collected Writings of John Murray. Vol. 4. Carlisle, Pennsylvania: Banner of Truth Trust. ISBN 0-85151-340-9.
- Murray, John. The Adamic Administration – via The-Highway.com.
- Reymond, Robert L. (1998). A New Systematic Theology of the Christian Faith. Nashville: Nelson. ISBN 0-8499-1317-9.
- Robertson, O. Palmer (1981). Christ of the Covenants. Phillipsburg: Presbyterian & Reformed. ISBN 0-87552-418-4.
- Robertson, O. Palmer (2000). The Israel of God: Yesterday, Today and Tomorrow. Phillipsburg: Presbyterian & Reformed. ISBN 0-87552-398-6.
- Schilder, Klaas (1996). Extra-Scriptural Binding: A New Danger. Neerlandia, Alta, Canada: Inheritance. ISBN 0-921100-46-9. The "danger" in the title is a reference to covenantism's challenge to Dutch Reformed theological confessionalism.
- Van Til, Cornelius (1955). "Covenant Theology". In Loetscher, L. A. (ed.). The New Schaff-Herzog Twentieth Century Encyclopedia of Religious Knowledge. Grand Rapids: Baker. ISBN 99914-2-980-8.
- Vos, Geerhardus (2001). "The Doctrine of the Covenant in Reformed Theology". In Gaffin, R. B. Jr. (ed.). Redemptive History and Biblical Interpretation: The Shorter Writings of Geerhardus Vos. Phillipsburg: Presbyterian & Reformed. ISBN 0-87552-513-X.
- Witsius, Hermann (1990). The Economy of the Covenants Between God and Man. Phillipsburg: Presbyterian & Reformed. ISBN 0-87552-870-8. Archived from the original on 20 August 2006 – via APuritanMind.com. 2 vols.

=== Critics ===
- Showers, Reginald (1990). There Really Is a Difference: A Comparison of Covenant and Dispensational Theology. Friends of Israel Gospel Ministry. ISBN 0-915540-50-9.
