= New Covenant theology =

Belief that Jesus Christ is the central focus of the Bible

New Covenant theology (or NCT) is a Christian theological position teaching that the person and work of Jesus Christ is the central focus of the Bible. One distinctive assertion of this school of thought is that Old Testament Laws have been abrogated or cancelled with Jesus's crucifixion, and replaced with the Law of Christ of the New Covenant. It shares similarities with, and yet is distinct from, dispensationalism and Covenant theology.

== Hermeneutic ==
The hermeneutic of the New Covenant theologian is Christocentric: to let the New Testament interpret the Old Testament. This means that when the NT interprets an OT promise differently than the plain reading, then NCT concludes that that is how God interprets his promise—and it may be surprising to us.

=== Example: Acts 15 and Amos 9 ===
As an example, Amos 9:11–12 is quoted by James in Acts 15 and is interpreted by him to associate rebuilding "David's fallen tent" with the Gentiles' salvation. This would be a highly surprising interpretation to the Jewish believers, since there is no precedent for it to be interpreted as anything other than a promise to the nation of Israel. NCT would say that God has given His interpretation of that passage, through James.

=== Consequences ===
The consistent Christocentric interpretation of the OT in light of the NT (Luke 24:27, 44; Rom. 10:4; 2 Cor. 1:20) results in the following theological distinctives:

==== The Plan of God ====
One plan of redemption, centered in Jesus Christ (Eph. 1:10; 2 Cor. 1:20; Col. 1:18), implemented according to the God’s eternal purpose (Eph. 1:11; 3:11; 2 Tim. 1:9), and securing the salvation of God’s elect (Rom. 8:28-32).

==== The Biblical Covenants ====
The covenants of Scripture progressively unfold God’s kingdom purpose (Matt.6:10) in history, culminating in the New Covenant.

==== The Old Covenant ====
The conditional (Exod. 19:5-6) treaty which God established with the ethnic descendants of Jacob at Mount Sinai – a covenant which formed the nation of Israel as a geopolitical entity, the sign of which was the Sabbath (Exod. 31:15–17), which was temporary in terms of its purpose and duration (Heb. 8:7–13), and which was superseded by the New Covenant (Jer. 31:31–33).

==== The New Covenant ====
The promised everlasting covenant (Heb. 13:20) established by Christ Jesus (Luke 22:20; Dan. 9:26-27) that fulfills all preceding biblical covenants – a covenant in which all believers have full forgiveness of sins (Jer. 31:34), are permanently indwelt by the Spirit (Ezek. 36:25-27; Eph. 1:13-14), and are empowered by the Spirit to please God (Jer. 31:31-33; Phil. 2:12-13).

==== The People of God ====
All God’s elect, consisting of believing Jews and Gentiles (Eph. 2:15), first formed as the body of Christ, which is the Church, at Pentecost (Acts 1:4-5; 2:1-41), not before (John 7:39; 17:21; Col. 1:26-27; Heb. 11:39-40), as one corporate spiritual body in New Covenant union with Christ (1 Cor. 12:13; Eph. 2:19-21; Col. 1:18, 24).

==== The Nation of Israel ====
The ethnic descendants of Jacob (Gen. 28:13-15) formed into a geopolitical entity at Sinai via the Old Covenant (Exod. 19:5-6), consisting of both believers and unbelievers (1 Cor. 10:1-5; Heb. 3:16-4:2), typological of Christ (Hos. 11:1; Matt. 2:15) and His Church (Exod. 19:5-6; 1 Pet. 2:9), the believing remnant (Rom. 9:27; 11:5) of which was transformed into the Church at Pentecost (Acts 2:1-10, 41).

==== The Law of God ====
The two greatest commandments – love of God and neighbor (Matt. 22:36-40) – constitute God’s absolute or innate law, which is righteous, unchanging, and instinctively known by man (Rom. 2:14-15) created in God’s image (Gen. 1:27), and of which each system of covenantal law is a temporary, historical outworking (Heb. 7:12) in accordance with God’s eternal purpose (Eph. 1:11; 3:11; 2 Tim. 1:9).

==== The Law of Moses ====
The covenantal outworking of God’s absolute law under the Old Covenant – the exhaustive, indivisible (Jas. 2:10; Gal. 5:3) legal code, summed up in the Ten Commandments (Exod. 34:28), covenantally binding upon the nation of Israel (Exod. 19:5–6; 24:3), temporary in its duration (Heb. 7:11–12; Col. 2:14), and fulfilled in Jesus Christ (Rom. 10:4; Matt. 5:17–18; Col. 2:16–17).

==== The Law of Christ ====
The covenantal outworking of God’s absolute law under the New Covenant – the gracious law of the New Covenant (Rom. 6:14), which is covenantally binding upon the Church (1 Cor. 9:20–21) and consists of the law of love (Matt. 5:44; Gal. 6:2; Jas. 2:8; Rom. 13:8–10), the example of the Lord Jesus Christ (John 13:34; Phil. 2:4–12), Christ’s commands and teaching (Matt. 28:20; 2 Pet. 3:2), the commands and teachings of the New Testament (2 Pet. 3:2; Eph. 2:20; Jude 1:17; 1 John 5:3), and all Scripture interpreted in light of Jesus Christ (Matt. 5:17-18; Luke 24:27, 44; 2 Tim. 3:16–17).

==== The Kingdom of God ====
The everlasting reign of God over the universe and His people, progressively unfolded via the biblical covenants – ultimately realized in the messianic reign of Jesus Christ in heaven with His saints (Heb. 1:1–4; Rev. 20:4; Eph. 2:6), that was eschatologically inaugurated at His ascension (Dan. 7:13–14) in fulfillment of the biblical covenants (2 Sam. 7:12–16; Acts 2:25–36), is advanced through the Spirit-empowered preaching of the Gospel (Acts 1:7–8), and will be consummated in the new heavens and new earth at the Second Coming when Christ subdues all His enemies (1 Cor. 15:24–28).

== Theological background ==
New Covenant Theology is a recently expressed Christian theological view of redemptive history that claims that all Old Covenant laws have been cancelled in favor of the Law of Christ or New Covenant law of the New Testament. This can be summarized as the ethical expectation found in the New Testament. New Covenant Theology does not reject all religious law, they only reject Old Covenant law. NCT is in contrast with other views on Biblical law in that most others do not believe the Ten Commandments and Divine laws of the Old Covenant have been cancelled, and may prefer the term "supersessionism" for the rest.

New Covenant theologians see the Law of Christ or New Testament Law as actually including many of the Divine Laws; thus, even though all Old Covenant laws have been cancelled, many have been renewed under the Law of Christ. This is a conclusion similar to older Christian theological systems on this issue, in that some Old Covenant laws are seen as still valid or renewed, but this conclusion is reached in a different way.

New Covenant theologians view their theology as a middle ground between a Reformed and dispensationalist view of how the Old Testament, and in particular the Mosaic Covenant, applies to the Christian today. New Covenant Theology is markedly different from dispensationalism, and probably has more in common with Reformed Covenant Theology. On the issue of the law, dispensationalism is most similar to NCT but their core belief is that the age of the Old Covenant is in the past, not that it has simply been cancelled. But NCT rejects the idea that the Bible can be divided into dispensations or ages. Some have criticized NCT for proposing that the Ten Commandments have been cancelled.

== Theological distinctiveness ==
New Covenant Theology is an Evangelical position, but within evangelicalism there are divergent views on a number of topics. One of those topics is how the salvation history fits together, and the relationship of the covenants within salvation history.

=== New Covenant (Law of Christ) ===
But now Jesus has obtained a superior ministry, since the covenant that he mediates is also better and is enacted on better promises.

— Hebrews 8:6, NIV

Christ's work on the cross is the New Covenant, by which people are reconciled to God sola gratia, and it includes various promises given in Old Testament times. The Abrahamic and Mosaic covenants were temporary covenants—the latter were for the (generally unbelieving) people of God, Israel—and had their fulfillment in the New Covenant. The New Covenant law is the Law of Christ, which includes the commands of his Apostles.

The New Covenant is the spiritual fulfillment of the Abrahamic covenant. Adherents believe that the New Covenant came into effect with ministry of Jesus, such as at the Last Supper when Jesus said in Luke 22:20 "This cup is the new covenant in my blood, which is poured out for you."

The New Testament, echoing Jeremiah 31:33, also states,

This is the covenant I will establish with the people of Israel after that time, declares the Lord. I will put my laws in their minds and write them on their hearts. I will be their God, and they will be my people.

— Hebrews 8:10, NIV

Thus, the New Covenant is a gracious covenant. Those included in the covenant are reconciled to God by grace alone, apart from anything they do. Jesus purchased a people by his death on the cross so that all those for whom he died receive full forgiveness of sins and become incurable God-lovers by the Holy Spirit. They have thus become his new creation.

=== Abrahamic covenant ===
New Covenant theologians believe that the Abrahamic covenant reveals God's plan to save a people and take them into his land. The Old Covenant with the Israelites and the promised land is a temporary picture of what is accomplished by the New Covenant, where Jesus actually purchased a people and will take them to be with him forever in the "new heavens and new earth" (Rev 21–22).

=== Old Covenant (Law of Moses) ===
The Old or Mosaic covenant is a legal or works covenant that God made with Israel on Mount Sinai. This covenant is brought to an end and is fulfilled at the cross. It was never intended to save people, but instead its purpose was to demonstrate the inability of even God's own chosen people to eradicate sin and guilt until the coming of the Messiah.Hebr.10:11. The fallen world, since the fall of Adam and Eve, can only increase in sin and guilt. Israel, under the Mosaic covenant, was the physical fulfillment of the Abrahamic covenant, a foreshadow of the superior New Covenant of grace.

=== Law ===
New Covenant theologians and advocates, such as Steve Lehrer of New Covenant Bible Fellowship in Tempe, Arizona; Peter Ditzel of Word of His Grace Ministries; and John G. Reisinger of Sound of Grace Ministries, hold that since "the whole Old Covenant is obsolete", "none of the commands of the Mosaic Law are binding on believers today."

The version of law in the New Covenant era is the Law of Christ, which includes the commands of Christ that pertain to the New Covenant era and the commands of his Apostles, but contain the Apostolic Decree. The Acts of the Apostles 15:20, 29.

Others believe that at least portions of the Old Testament law is binding on Christians, although there is some variation on which parts and how they apply.

=== Circumcision and baptism ===
New Covenant Theology holds that circumcision was the physical picture of the changed heart promised to believers in Christ. It signifies that people were physically born into the people of God of Israel. It was given to all Israelites, irrespective of repentance and faith. Baptism is the outward sign that regeneration has occurred. It signifies that someone has been spiritually born into the believing people of God (a new creation), the church. It is given to all those who give evidence of regeneration, which is repentance and faith.

== Critics ==
Critics claim NCT does not have any non-Biblical historical writings to help validate their system of theology. Many critics such as Richard Barcellos in his book In Defense of the Decalogue : A Critique of New Covenant Theology find fault with NCT treatment of the Ten Commandments as having been abrogated. They also claim that NCT makes the mistake of claiming a different form of salvation between the Old Covenant and the New Covenant even though the 'salvation act' had not yet been carried out in the Old Testament. One such example would be from the book New Covenant Theology by Tom Wells and Fred Zaspel. Page 31 deals with the gospel preached to Abraham and says that it was not "the gospel" but the "promise of the gospel". Referring to Romans 1:2, the book states, "Paul looks on the gospel as 'promised beforehand through his prophets in the Holy Scriptures' plainly implying that it had not yet come in OT times." Luke.24:44.

== See also ==
- Antithesis of the Law
- Dual-covenant theology
- Paul the Apostle and Judaism
- Progressive dispensationalism
- Red-Letter Christians
- Sabbath in Christianity
- Supersessionism

== Resources ==
- Barcellos, Richard C. (2001a), In Defense of the Decalogue: A Critique of New Covenant Theology, Winepress Publishing.
- ——— (2001), In Defense of the Decalogue: A Critique of New Covenant Theology, Founder’s press.
- Gibson, Greg (2008), All Old Testament Laws Cancelled: 24 Reasons Why All Old Testament Laws Are Cancelled and All New Testament Laws Are for Our Obedience
- Steven Lehrer, ed., Journal of New Covenant Theology
- ——— (2006), New Covenant Theology: questions answered (PDF), IDS, ISBN 0-9786444-0-9, archived from the original (PDF) on 2016-03-07, 235 pp., defines the NCT understanding of scripture, and answers questions about it.
- Moo, Douglas J (1993), "Modified Lutheran View", The Law, the Gospel, and the Modern Christian: Five Views (PDF), Grand Rapids: Zondervan, p. 343, ISBN 978-0-310-53321-4, archived from the original (PDF) on 2010-08-27: "The entire Mosaic law comes to fulfillment in Christ, and this fulfillment means that this law is no longer a direct and immediate source of, or judge of, the conduct of God's people. Christian behavior, rather, is now guided directly by 'the law of Christ'. This 'law' does not consist of legal prescriptions and ordinances, but of the teaching and example of Jesus and the apostles, the central demand of love, and the guiding influence of the indwelling Holy Spirit."
  P. 376: "The content of all but one of the Ten Commandments is taken up into "the law of Christ", for which we are responsible. (The exception is the Sabbath commandment, one that Heb. 3–4 suggests is fulfilled in the new age as a whole.)"
- Reisinger, John G., 1998, Abraham's Four Seeds, Frederick, MD: New Covenant Media.
- Scarborough, C., The New Covenant and the Law of Christ: A Biblical Study Guide. Published privately, available from New Covenant Media/1-800-376-4146.
- Wells, Tom and Zaspel, Fred, 2002. New Covenant Theology: Description, Definition, Defense, Frederick, MD: New Covenant Media.
