= Covenant (biblical) =

Religious concept in the Hebrew Bible

The Hebrew Bible makes reference to a number of covenants (Hebrew: בְּרִיתוֹת) with God (YHWH). These include the Noahic Covenant set out in Genesis 9, which is decreed between God and all living creatures, as well as a number of more specific covenants with Abraham, the whole Israelite people, the Israelite priesthood, and the Davidic lineage of kings. In form and terminology, these covenants echo the kinds of treaty agreements existing in the surrounding ancient world.

The Book of Jeremiah, verses 31:30–33 says that YHWH will establish a new covenant with the house of Israel and the house of Judah. Some Christians believe this New Covenant is the "replacement" or "final fulfilment" of the Old Covenant described in the Old Testament and as applying to the People of God, while others believe both covenants are still applicable in a dual-covenant theology.

== Ancient Near Eastern ==
The Hebrew term בְּרִית bĕriyth for "covenant" is from a root with the sense of "cutting", because pacts or covenants were made by passing between cut pieces of flesh of an animal sacrifice.

There are two major types of covenants in the Hebrew Bible: the obligatory type and the promissory type. The obligatory covenant is more common with the Hittite peoples, and deals with the relationship between two parties of equal standing. In contrast, the promissory type of covenant is seen in the Abrahamic and Davidic covenants. Promissory covenants focus on the relationship between the suzerain and the vassal and are similar to the "royal grant" type of legal document, which include historical introduction, border delineations, stipulations, witnesses, blessings, and curses. In royal grants, the master could reward a servant for being loyal. God rewarded Abraham, Noah, and David in his covenants with them. As part of his covenant with Abraham, God has the obligation to keep Abraham's descendants as God's chosen people and be their God. God acts as the suzerain power and is the party of the covenant accompanied by the required action that comes with the oath whether it be fire or animals in the sacrificial oaths. In doing this, God is the party taking upon the curse if he does not uphold his obligation. Through history there were also many instances where the vassal was the one who performed the different acts and took the curse upon them.

=== Terminology ===
Weinfeld believes that similar terminology and wording can connect the Abrahamic and Davidic covenants with ancient Near Eastern grants, as opposed to being largely similar to the Mosaic covenant, which, according to Weinfeld, is an example of a suzerainty treaty. He goes on to argue that phrases about having a "whole heart" or having "walked after me [God] with all his heart" strongly parallels with Neo-Assyrian grant language, such as "walked with royalty". He further argues that in Jeremiah, God uses prophetic metaphor to say that David will be adopted as a son. Expressing legal and political relationships through familial phraseology was common among Near Eastern cultures. Babylonian contracts often expressed fathership and sonship in their grants to actually mean a king to vassal relationship.

Further underlying the idea that these covenants were grant-like in nature is the similar language used in both. In the grant of Ashurbanipal, an Assyrian, to his servant Bulta, he describes Bulta's loyalty with the phrase "kept the charge of my kinship". Abraham similarly kept God's charge in Genesis 26: 4–5: "I will give to your descendants all these lands...in as much as Abraham obeyed me and kept my charge, my commandments, my rules and my teachings."

=== Dissolution ===
According to Mendenhall, pressures from outside invaders led the loosely bound Israelite tribes to converge into monarchical unity for stability and solidarity. He also argues that during this consolidation, the new state also had to unify the religious traditions that belonged to the different groups to prevent dissent from those who might believe that the formation of a state would replace direct governance from God. Therefore, Mendenhall continues, these loosely bound tribes merged under the Mosaic covenant to legitimize their unity. They believed that to obey the law was to obey God. They also believed that the king was put into power as a result of God's benefaction, and that this accession was the fulfillment of God's promise of dynasty to David. Mendenhall also notes that a conflict arose between those who believed in the Davidic covenant, and those who believed that God would not support all actions of the state. As a result, both sides became relatively aloof, and the Davidic covenant and the Mosaic covenant were almost entirely forgotten.

== Biblical ==
Students of the Bible hold differing opinions as to how many major covenants were created between God and humanity, with numbers ranging from one to at least twelve. (See covenant theology and dispensationalism for further information on two of the major viewpoints.) Some scholars classify only two: a covenant of promise and a covenant of law. The former involved an oath taken by God – a word of promise instead of command – while the latter is known in the Bible as "the Law".

=== Noahic ===
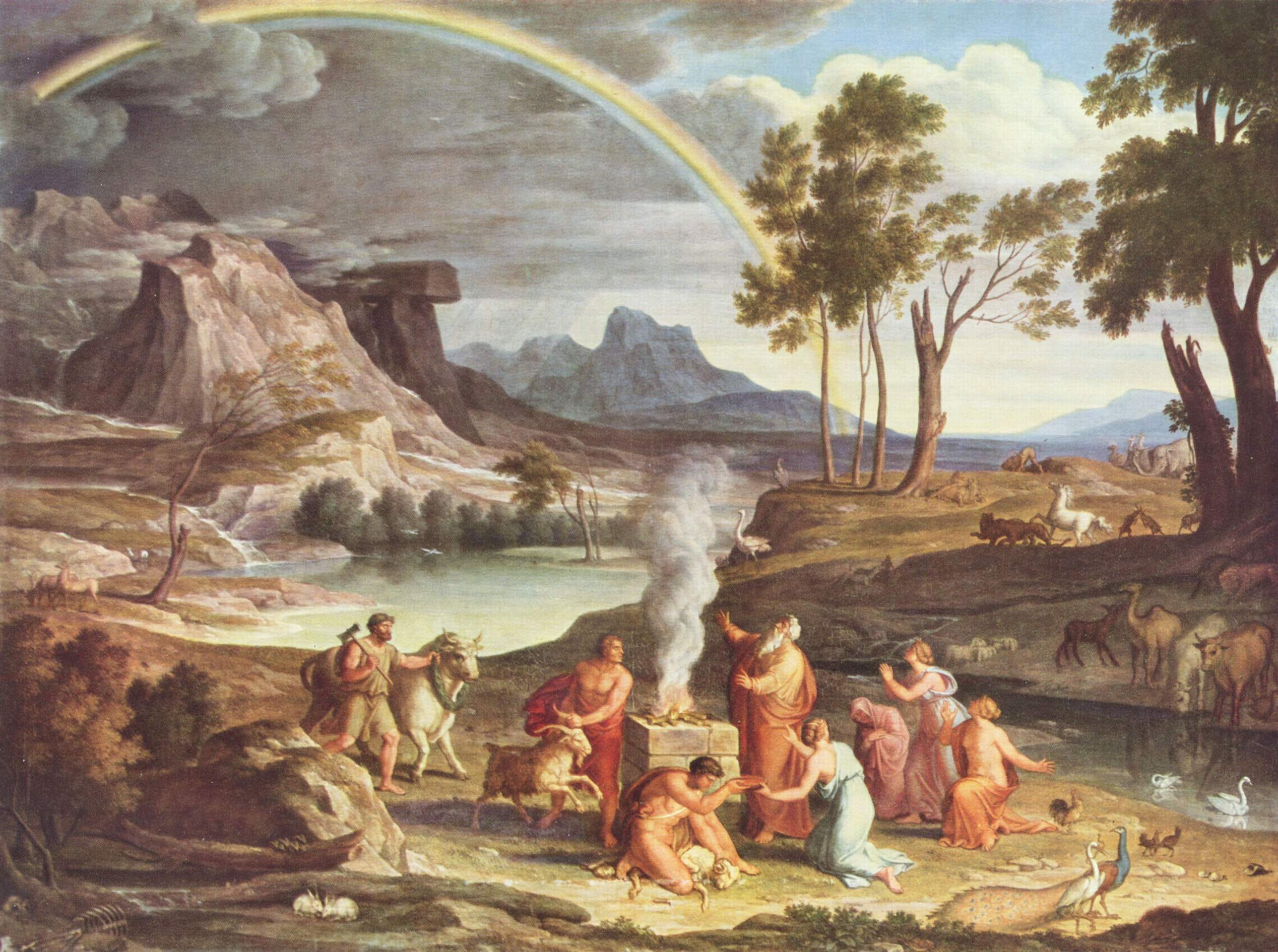
Noah's Thanksoffering (c. 1803) by Joseph Anton Koch. Noah builds an altar to the Lord after being delivered from the great Flood; God sends the rainbow as a sign of his covenant.

The Noahic covenant recounted in Genesis 9:9-17 applies to all of humanity and all other living creatures. In this covenant with all living creatures, God promises never again to destroy all life on Earth by flood and creates the rainbow as the sign of this "everlasting covenant between God and every living creature of all flesh that is on the earth".

Ahead of the covenant (in Genesis 9:1-7), Noah and the generations of his posterity were required by God to procreate, and not to shed human blood (murder), because mankind was made in the image of God. Jews are forbidden to consume meat with the blood in it, but Bnei Noah Noahidism are allowed the blood of a living animal (Maimonides, Laws of Kings and Wars, Chapter IX Law 10). Alexander Maclaren notes that while the term covenant "usually implies a reciprocal bond, both parties to which come under obligations by it, each to the other. But, in this case, there are no obligations on the part of man or of the creatures. This covenant is God's only." Samaritans who believe only in the Written Torah do not consider outsiders to be subject to Mosaic law or the patriarchal covenant but regardless considers the Noahic covenant to be Divine law that is not enforced nor envisioned in the lens of universalism but rather are a fundamental moral code which is to expected for a nation or culture to be considered virtuous outside the covenant. Foreigners are allotted different inheritances and powers outside of the Israelite people according to the book of Deuteronomy and the commentary of Memar Marqah.

=== Abrahamic ===
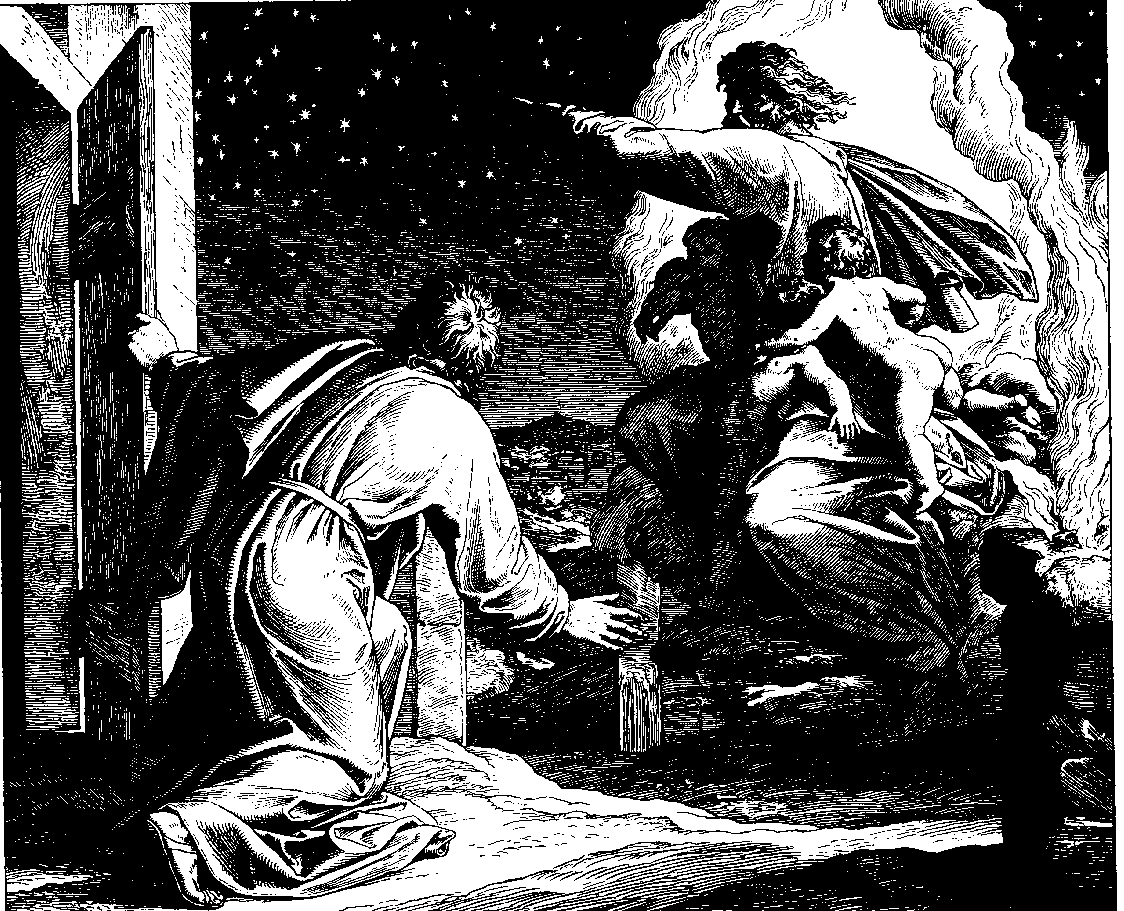
The Vision of the Lord Directing Abram to Count the Stars (woodcut by Julius Schnorr von Carolsfeld from the 1860 Bible in Pictures)

The Book of Genesis includes a number of promises by God to Abraham paired with actions by Abraham, notably in Genesis 12, 15, 17, and 22. Only the promises of Genesis 15 ("covenant of the pieces") and Genesis 17 ("covenant of circumcision") are referred to in the text by the term "covenant" (brit).

Verses	Name	Abraham's action	God's promise
Genesis 12:1–3	-	Migrates to the promised land	To make of Abraham a great nation and bless Abraham and make his name great so that he will be a blessing; to bless those who bless him and curse him who curses him; all peoples on earth would be blessed through Abraham.
Genesis 15	Covenant of the pieces or "Covenant between the parts" (Brit bein HaBetarim)	Offers several animal sacrifices	To give Abraham's descendants all the land from the river of Egypt to the Euphrates. Later, this land came to be referred to as the Promised Land (see map) or the Land of Israel.
Genesis 17	Covenant of circumcision (brit milah)	Circumcises himself and his family, and commits to doing so in perpetuity (the brit milah ritual in Judaism).	To make Abraham the father of many nations and of many descendants and give "the whole land of Canaan" to his descendants. The covenant was for Abraham and his "seed" (offspring), both of natural birth and adoption.
Genesis 22:16–18	-	Demonstrates willingness to sacrifice his son	To make Abraham's descendants as numerous as the stars and sand, and to defeat and inherit their enemies.

The covenants with Abraham were later alluded to by Abraham in discussion with his senior servant, and their contents were reaffirmed to his son Isaac and his grandson Jacob. In later generations, God's covenant with the patriarchs (Abraham, Isaac, and Jacob) was repeatedly cited as a reason for God to perform kindness to their descendants, the people of Israel.

In the documentary hypothesis, the promises of Genesis 12, 15, and 17 are attributed to Jahwist, Elohist and Priestly sources.

==== Genesis 15 ====
The Abrahamic covenant is part of a tradition of covenantal sacrifices that dates to the third millennium BC. The animals that are slaughtered in the covenant in Genesis 15 are considered a sacrificial offering. And it is that covenant which preserves the sacrificial element alongside the symbolic act.

According to Weinfeld, the Abrahamic covenant represents a covenant of grant, which binds the suzerain. It is the obligation of the master to his servant and involves gifts given to individuals who were loyal serving their masters. In the covenant with Abraham in Genesis 15, it is God who is the suzerain who commits himself and swears to keep the promise. In the covenant there are procedures for taking the oath, which involve a smoking oven and a blazing torch. There are many similarities between Genesis 15 and the Abba-El deed. In Genesis 15 and similarly in the Abba-El deed, it is the superior party who places himself under oath. The oaths in both, moreover, involve a situation wherein the inferior party delivers the animals while the superior party swears the oath.

==== Genesis 17 ====
Covenants in biblical times were often sealed by severing an animal, with the implication that the party who breaks the covenant will suffer a similar fate. In Hebrew, the verb meaning to seal a covenant translates literally as "to cut". It is presumed by Jewish scholars that the removal of the foreskin symbolically represents such a sealing of the covenant.

=== Mosaic ===
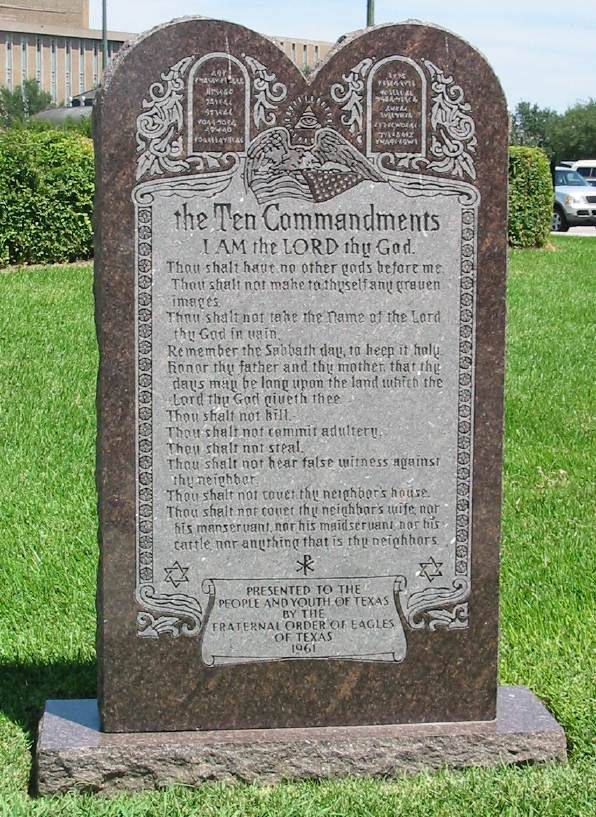
The Ten Commandments on a monument on the grounds of the Texas State Capitol

The Mosaic covenant made with Moses and the Israelite people at Horeb-Sinai, which is found in Exodus 19–24 and the book of Deuteronomy, contains the foundations of the written Torah. In this covenant, God promises to make the Israelites his treasured possession among all people and "a kingdom of priests and a holy nation", if they follow God's commandments. As part of the terms of this covenant, God gives Moses the Ten Commandments (Exodus 20:1-17); these are later embellished or elaborated on in the rest of the Torah. The blood of sacrificial oxen is thereafter sprinkled on the altar (Exodus 24:6) and on the people (Exodus 24:8) to seal the covenant.

Beyond its central religious purpose, the Mosaic covenant was also political. It established Israel as a holy nation and gave them a new sense of national identity.

The form of the covenant resembles the suzerainty treaty in the ancient Near East. Like the treaties, the Ten Commandments begins with Yahweh's identification and what he had done for Israel ("who brought you out of the land of Egypt"; Ex 20:2) as well as the stipulations commanding absolute loyalty ("You shall not have other gods apart from me"). Unlike the suzerainty treaty, the Decalogue does not have any witness nor explicit blessings and curses. The fullest account of the Mosaic covenant is given in the book of Deuteronomy.

God gave the sons of Israel the Shabbat as the permanent sign of this covenant.

=== Priestly ===
The priestly covenant (Hebrew: ברית הכהונה, romanized: brith ha-kehuna) is the covenant that God made with Aaron and his descendants, the Aaronic priesthood, as found in the Hebrew Bible and Oral Torah. The Hebrew Bible also mentions another perpetual priestly promise with Phinehas and his descendants.

=== Davidic ===
The Davidic royal covenant (2 Samuel 7) was made between God and David. It promised to establish David's dynasty forever, designating David and his descendants as the kings of the united monarchy of Israel (which included Judah).

This covenant is an important element in Jewish messianism and Christian theology. In Jewish eschatology, the messiah is believed to be a future Jewish king from the Davidic paternal line. The Hasmonean kings were not considered connected to the Davidic line, but the general belief is that in the end of times God will select and appoint a king from the Davidic line.

=== Other covenants ===
Later in the Bible, the early covenants between God and the Israelites were reaffirmed through additional covenants enacted by Asa, Hezekiah, Jehoiada, and Josiah.

The Bible also describes a number of covenants made between different humans, for example between Abraham and Abimelech, and between Solomon and Hiram.

== Christianity ==
=== Old ===
Christian theologian John F. Walvoord maintains that the Davidic covenant deserves an important place in determining the purposes of God and that its exegesis confirms the doctrine of a future reign of Christ on earth. While Jewish theologians have always held that Jesus did not fulfill the expectations of a Jewish messiah, Dispensational (historically grammatically literal) biblical theologians are almost unanimous that Jesus will fully fulfill the Davidic covenant, the provisions of which Walvoord lists as:

1. David is to have a child, yet to be born, who shall succeed him and establish his kingdom.
2. A son (Solomon) shall build the temple instead of David.
3. The throne of his kingdom shall be established forever.
4. The throne will not be taken away from him (Solomon) even though his sins justify chastisement.
5. David's house, throne, and kingdom shall be established forever (2 Samuel 7:16).

=== New ===
The New Covenant is a biblical interpretation originally derived from a phrase in the Book of Jeremiah, in the Hebrew Scriptures. It is often thought of as an eschatological Messianic Age or world to come and is related to the biblical concept of the Kingdom of God.

Generally, Christians believe that the New Covenant was instituted at the Last Supper as part of the Eucharist, which in the Gospel of John includes the New Commandment. A connection between the Blood of Christ and the New Covenant is seen in most modern English translations of the New Testament with the saying: "this cup that is poured out for you is the new covenant in my blood".

Christians see Jesus as the mediator of this New Covenant, and that his blood, shed at his crucifixion is the required blood of the covenant: as with all covenants between God and man described in the Bible, the New Covenant is considered "a bond in blood sovereignly administered by God". It has been theorized that the New Covenant is the Law of Christ as spoken during his Sermon on the Mount.

In the Christian context, this New Covenant is associated with the word 'testament ' in the sense of a 'will left after the death of a person', the instructions for the inheritance of property (Latin testamentum), the original Greek word used in Scripture being diatheke (διαθήκη) which in the Greek context only meant 'will (left after death)' and virtually never 'covenant, alliance'. This fact implies a reinterpreted view of the Old Testament covenant as possessing characteristics of a 'will left after death' in Christian theology and has generated considerable attention from biblical scholars and theologians. The reason is connected with the translation of the Hebrew word for covenant, brit (בְּרִית), in the Septuagint: see 'why the word Testament' in the New Testament article.

== Islam ==
The Mosaic covenant is referred to in a number of places in the Quran as a reminder for the Jews, of whom two tribes inhabited Medina at the time of Muhammad. The verses also mention particular commandments of the Decalogue and, in God's words, admonishes the Jews for being insolent about it and displaying violence against the prophets – a group of them they called liars, and other prophets among them they killed –^{[Quran 4:155]},^{[ 5:70]} even though they agreed to keep them at the time the covenant was made.

The Quran also states how God cursed the Children of Israel and made them suffer for breaking the covenant^{[ 4:155]},^{[ 5:13]} while also mentioning other covenants such a prophetic covenant with the Israelites in Quran 3:81, the Noahic and Abrahamic covenants in Quran 33:7, and in 5:14 and 7:169 a covenant made with the followers of Jesus (apparently

== See also ==
- Covenant theology
- Covenantal theology (Roman Catholic)
- Covenantal nomism
- Covenant (Latter Day Saints)
- Christian views on the Old Covenant
- New Covenant
- Oaths in Jewish tradition
