= New Covenant =

Theological concept in Christianity

The New Covenant (Ancient Greek: διαθήκη καινή, romanized: diathḗkē kainḗ) is a biblical interpretation which was originally derived from a phrase in the Book of Jeremiah (Jeremiah 31:31–34), in the Hebrew Bible (or the Old Testament of the Christian Bible). Generally, Christians believe that the promised New Covenant—new relationship with God—was instituted at the Last Supper as part of the Eucharist, which, in the Gospel of John, includes the New Commandment.

Most Christians believe that Jesus is the mediator of the New Covenant, and they also believe that the blood of Christ, which was shed during his crucifixion, is the only blood sacrifice which is required by the covenant. Based on the biblical passage in the Epistle to the Hebrews (9:16–17) which reads that, "Where a will is involved, the death of the one who made it must be established. For a will takes effect only at death, since it is not in force as long as the one who made it is alive." Protestants tend to believe that the New Covenant came into force with the death of Jesus the Christ, and the commentary to the Roman Catholic New American Bible also says that Christ is the "testator whose death puts his will into effect".

There are several Christian eschatologies that further define the New Covenant. For example, an inaugurated eschatology defines and describes the New Covenant as an ongoing relationship between Christian believers and God that will be in full fruition after the Second Coming of Christ; that is, it will not only be in full fruition in believing hearts, it will also be in fruition in the world to come. The description of the connection between the blood of Christ and the New Covenant is contained in most modern English translations of the New Testament such as the Luke 22:20 which reads: "this cup that is poured out for you is the new covenant in my blood".

== Christianity ==
The key New Testament chapter for the Christian concept of the New Covenant is Hebrews 8, a portion of which is quoted below:

But now Jesus has obtained a superior ministry, since the covenant that he mediates is also better and is enacted on better promises. For if that first covenant had been faultless, there would have been no occasion to look for a second. For he finds fault with them when he says: "Behold, the days are coming, declares the Lord, when I will establish a new covenant with the house of Israel and with the house of Judah, not like the covenant that I made with their fathers on the day when I took them by the hand to bring them out of the land of Egypt. For they did not continue in my covenant, and so I showed no concern for them, declares the Lord. For this is the covenant that I will make with the house of Israel after those days, declares the Lord: I will put my laws into their minds, and write them on their hearts, and I will be their God, and they shall be my people. And they shall not teach, each one his neighbor and each one his brother, saying, 'Know the Lord,' for they shall all know me, from the least of them to the greatest. For I will be merciful toward their iniquities, and I will remember their sins no more." In speaking of a new covenant, he makes the first one obsolete. And what is becoming obsolete and growing old is ready to vanish away.

— Hebrews 8:6–13

That full quotation, with partial quotations of the same text in other New Testament passages, reflects that the authors of the New Testament and Christian leaders generally, consider Jeremiah 31:31–34 to be a central Old Testament prophecy of the New Covenant. Here is the key text:

Behold, the days are coming, declares the Lord, when I will make a new covenant with the house of Israel and the house of Judah, not like the covenant that I made with their fathers on the day when I took them by the hand to bring them out of the land of Egypt, my covenant that they broke, though I was their husband, declares the Lord. For this is the covenant that I will make with the house of Israel after those days, declares the Lord: I will put my law within them, and I will write it on their hearts. And I will be their God, and they shall be my people. And no longer shall each one teach his neighbor and each his brother, saying, "Know the Lord," for they shall all know me, from the least of them to the greatest, declares the Lord. For I will forgive their iniquity, and I will remember their sin no more.

— Jeremiah 31:31–34

Some Christians claim that there are many other passages that speak about the same New Covenant without using this exact wording. Some passages speak of a "covenant of peace", others use other constructions; some simply say "covenant", but the context may imply that the New Covenant is at issue; and some claim metaphorical descriptions, for example that "Mount Zion" is really a metaphor for the New Covenant.

=== New Testament texts ===
The occurrence of the phrase "new covenant" varies in English translations of the Greek New Testament. The King James Version sometimes uses testament for covenant, with the words new covenant together occurring in Hebrews 8:8, 8:13 and 12:24 while in the New International Version "new covenant" occurs at Luke 22:20, 1 Corinthians 11:25, 2 Corinthians 3:6, Hebrews 8:8, Hebrews 9:15 and Hebrews 12:24 as a translation of some form of διαθήκη and καινός or νέας.

Luke 22:17–20 (part of the Last Supper) is disputed. Six forms of the text have been identified; for example, the Western text-type such as Codex Bezae omit verses 19b–20.

The Daniel 9:27 commentary found in the 1599 Geneva Bible connects the verse with the New King James Version translation of Matthew 26:28. In this interpretation, the angel Gabriel reveals the coming New Blood Covenant of the Messiah, which is the fulfillment of the promise that through Abraham's seed all the nations would be blessed. (Galatians 3:16, 26–29)

=== Christian view ===
Christians view the New Covenant as a new relationship between God and humans mediated by Jesus upon sincere declaration that one believes in Jesus Christ as Lord and God. Some Protestant theologians teach that the New Covenant also breaks the generational curse of original sin on all children of Adam if they believe in Jesus Christ, after people are judged for their own sins, which is expected to happen with the Second Coming of Jesus Christ.

Most historic Christian Churches, including the Roman Catholic Church, Lutheran Churches, Methodist Churches and Reformed Churches, have traditionally held that law in the Old Covenant has three components: ceremonial, moral, and civil (cf. covenant theology). They teach that while the ceremonial and civil (judicial) laws have been abolished, the moral law as contained in the Ten Commandments still continues to bind Christian believers.

Dispensationalist theology, taught by certain denominations such as the Plymouth Brethren, present a view of the nature of Israel is that God's promises to Israel are distinct from the Church. The Church, in this present age, is in no way a "spiritual Israel". Some Christians, however, believe that the Church has inherited and absorbed God's promises to Israel, and that Israel is primarily a spiritual nation composed of Jews who claim Jesus as their Messiah, as well as Gentile believers who through the New Covenant have been grafted into the promises made to Israelites. This spiritual Israel is based on the faith of the patriarch Abraham (before he was circumcised) who was ministered by the Melchizedek priesthood, which is understood to be a type for the Christian faith of believing Jesus to be Christ and Lord in the order of Melchizedek. The Apostle Paul says that it is not "the children of the flesh" who are the children of God, but "the children of the promise". While Christ came as a priest in the order of Melchizedeck, which is to say without precedence, and fulfilled God's promise of a Messiah to the entire world whosoever believes, Dispensationalists believe that the body of God's promises concerning the future of Israel were to Israel alone, and should not be interpreted as being superimposed on the Church in the present age. God's remaining promises to Israel will come to fruition in the Millennium, the 1,000 year reign of Christ on Earth.

Not as though the word of God hath taken none effect. For they are not all Israel, which are of Israel: Neither, because they are the seed of Abraham, are they all children: but, In Isaac shall thy seed be called. That is, They which are the children of the flesh, these are not the children of God: but the children of the promise are counted for the seed.

— Romans 9:6–8

=== Membership ===
Among Christians, there are significant differences on the question of membership in the New Covenant. These differences can be so serious that they form a principal reason for division i.e., denominationalism. Christian denominations exist because of their answer to this question. The first major split is between those who believe that only believers are members of the New Covenant, and (reflecting the idea of the Jewish covenants as national or community covenants) those who believe that believers and their children are members of the New Covenant.

These differences give rise to different views on whether children may be baptised: the credobaptist view and the paedobaptist view. Secondarily, there are differences among paedobaptists as to the nature of the membership of children in the covenant.

=== Knowledge of God ===
Another difference is between those who believe the New Covenant has already substantially arrived (Preterists), and that this knowledge of God that the member of the New Covenant has is primarily salvific knowledge; and those that believe that the New Covenant has not yet substantially arrived, but will in the Second Coming, and that this knowledge is more complete knowledge, meaning a member of the New Covenant no longer has to be taught anything at all regarding the Christian life (not just that they lack need for exhortation regarding salvific reconciliation with God).

This division does not just break down along Jewish v. Christian lines (as the previous difference did). In general, those that are more likely to lean toward the "already view", or "salvific knowledge view", are those Christians that do not believe in the indivisible Church (the indivisible Church is a belief of Catholics and Orthodox) and Christians that practice believer's baptism, because both believe the New Covenant is more present reality than future reality. Also in general, those that lean toward the "not yet view", or "complete knowledge view", practice infant baptism for covenantal reasons, and dispensationalistic Christians (even though they tend to practice believer's baptism), because they believe the New Covenant is more future reality than present reality.

=== Christian supersessionism ===
Supersessionism is the view that the New Covenant replaces, fulfills or completes God's prior covenants with the Israelites. The most common alternatives to Supersessionism are abrogation of old covenant laws and dual-covenant theology.

== Judaism ==
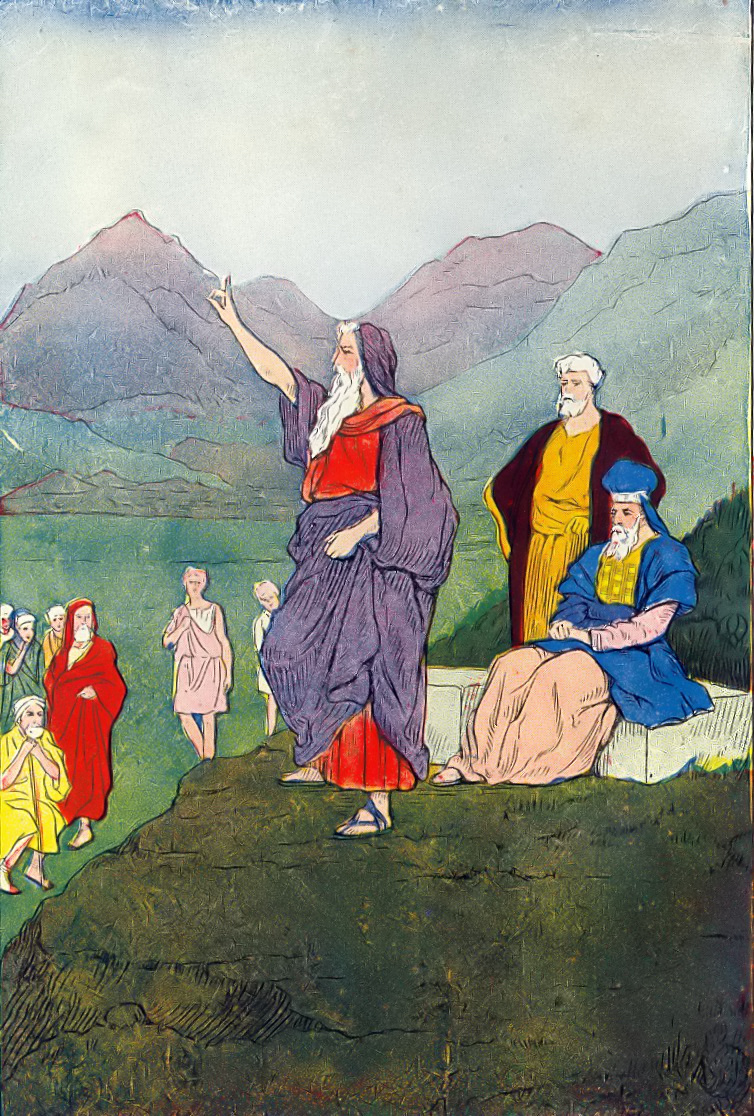
Moses Speaks to the Children of Israel (illustration from Hartwell James's The Boys of the Bible)

The only reference in the Hebrew Bible that uses the wording "new covenant" is found in Jeremiah 31:31–34:

Behold, the days come, saith the LORD, that I will make a new covenant with the house of Israel, and with the house of Judah; not according to the covenant that I made with their fathers in the day that I took them by the hand to bring them out of the land of Egypt; forasmuch as they broke My covenant, although I was a lord over them, saith the LORD. But this is the covenant that I will make with the house of Israel after those days, saith the LORD, I will put My law in their inward parts, and in their heart will I write it; and I will be their God, and they shall be My people; and they shall teach no more every man his neighbour, and every man his brother, saying: 'Know the LORD'; for they shall all know Me, from the least of them unto the greatest of them, saith the LORD; for I will forgive their iniquity, and their sin will I remember no more.

This prophet's word refers to the Messianic Age to come (or World to come), in which the eternal Mosaic covenant with Israel will be confirmed. Of this Mosaic covenant between God and Israel the Shabbat is declared to be the sign forever (Exodus 31:13–17). The Tanakh describes Shabbat as having the purpose as a "taste" of Olam Haba (the world to come, the Hereafter) following the Messianic Age (the End of Days).

The Jewish view of the mere wording "new covenant" is no more than a renewed national commitment to abide by God's laws, similar to the covenants enacted by Asa, Hezekiah, Jehoiada, and Josiah in the later books of the Bible. In this view, the word new does not refer to a new commitment that replaces a previous one, but rather to an additional and greater level of commitment.

Because Jews view the Mosaic covenant as applying only to Jews and any New Covenant merely a strengthening of the already existing one, Jews do not see this phrase as relevant in any way to non-Jews. For non-Jews, Judaism advocates the pre-Sinaitic Seven Laws of Noah.

In his 1962 work The Prophets, Abraham Joshua Heschel points out that prophecy is not the only instrument of God to change the hearts of Israel, to know that he is God. He tells how the prophet Jeremiah complains that Israel is circumcised in body but "uncircumcised in heart" (9:26), that Jeremiah says "wash your heart from wickedness" (4:14). Heschel analyses that, while the prophet can only give Israel a new word, it is God himself who will give man a new heart: The "new covenant" will accomplish the complete transformation of every individual.

Compare with:

And I will give them one heart, and I will put a new spirit within you; and I will remove the stony heart out of their flesh, and will give them a heart of flesh; that they may walk in My statutes, and keep Mine ordinances, and do them; and they shall be My people, and I will be their God.

— Ezekiel 11:19–20

A new heart also will I give you, and a new spirit will I put within you; and I will take away the stony heart out of your flesh, and I will give you a heart of flesh. And I will put My spirit within you, and cause you to walk in My statutes, and ye shall keep Mine ordinances, and do them. And ye shall dwell in the land that I gave to your fathers; and ye shall be My people, and I will be your God. And I will save you from all your uncleannesses; and I will call for the corn, and will increase it, and lay no famine upon you. And I will multiply the fruit of the tree, and the increase of the field, that ye may receive no more the reproach of famine among the nations. Then shall ye remember your evil ways, and your doings that were not good; and ye shall loathe yourselves in your own sight for your iniquities and for your abominations. Not for your sake do I this, saith the Lord GOD, be it known unto you; be ashamed and confounded for your ways, O house of Israel.

— Ezekiel 36:26–32

The Jewish Encyclopedia's "New Testament" article states:

The idea of the new covenant is based chiefly upon Jeremiah 31:31–34 (comp. Hebrews 8:6–13, 10:16). That the prophet's words do not imply an abrogation of the Law is evidenced by his emphatic declaration of the immutability of the covenant with Israel (Jeremiah 31:35–36; comp. 33:25); he obviously looked for a renewal of the Law through a regeneration of the hearts of the people.

It is mentioned several times in the Mishna and Talmud, and had been used extensively in kabbalistic literature due to the gematria value of 135 being equal to the word HaSinai (הסיני) in Genesis 10:17. Brit also has the numeric value of 612, which is suggested by some to mean that it is the "first" mitzvah which is true for the Jewish life cycle. The other use is in relationship to the merit of Ruth being an ancestor to King David, with the name again having same gematria as Brit, linking Davidic covenant with that of all previous, since Ruth was a Moabite by birth, and related to Noah also.

== Islam ==
The Quran mentions that God has made a new covenant of sorts with the Christians but they "neglected part of it" and were consequently punished for that.

== See also ==
- Christian Torah-submission
- Christian views on the Old Covenant
- Christianity and Judaism
- Expounding of the Law
- Jewish Christian
- Judaizers
- Law of Christ
- Messiah in Judaism
- New Covenant theology
- New Testament § Etymology
- New Wine into Old Wineskins
- Pauline Christianity
