= John Simson =

Scottish theologian

John Simson (1667–1740) was a Scottish "New Licht" theologian, involved in a long investigation of alleged heresy. He was suspended from teaching as Professor of Divinity at the University of Glasgow for his later life.

== Life ==
He was born on 13 July 1667, the eldest son of Rev Patrick Simson (1628–1715), minister of Renfrew. John was educated at the University of Edinburgh where he graduated M.A. on 18 July 1692, then did further studies at Glasgow University being appointed university librarian in 1696. On 13 July 1698 he was licensed to preach as a Church of Scotland minister by the Presbytery of Paisley.

In September 1698 he travelled to the Netherlands to receive instruction from Johannes Marck, professor of divinity at Leiden University, staying from 1689 to 1731. During this period, his brother Matthew Simson (1673–1756), minister at Pencaitland, Haddingtonshire, was entered at Leyden as a divinity student on 20 February 1699, and it is probable that Simson accompanied him, though he is not entered in the list of students. In poor health, he obtained no ministerial charge till 1705, when he was called to Troqueer, Kirkcudbrightshire on 21 June, and ordained there on 20 September 1708 he was promoted to be professor of divinity in the University of Glasgow, succeeding James Wodrow, father of Robert Wodrow. He lectured in Latin, using Marck's Medulla as his main text-book.

He was never convicted of heresy. He adopted the maxim that reason is 'fundamentum theologiæ,' and his aim was to make orthodoxy intelligible. For 20 years the ranks of presbyterian clergy in the west of Scotland and north of Ireland were recruited from his pupils. In 1710 Simson discussed his views at Moffat with James Webster (1659–1720), minister of the Tolbooth Church, Edinburgh. Subsequently, he stated his position in correspondence with Robert Rowan (1660–1714), minister of Penningham, Wigtownshire, and with James Hog, editor of The Marrow. Webster first publicly attacked Simson in August 1712. On 17 March 1714 he made formal charges in the Edinburgh presbytery. Through the synod of Lothian the matter reached the General Assembly, and Webster, acting under the assembly's order, tabled his complaint before the Glasgow presbytery in the autumn. Simson gave in his replies on 29 March 1715, and the general assembly on 8 May referred the case to a committee of thirty ministers and six elders, on 13 May. At the head of the committee was William Carstares, who died before the end of the year. The leading theologians on it were James Hadow, and William Hamilton, D.D., Professor of divinity at Edinburgh. The gist of the accusation was that Simson had attributed too much to the "light of nature", but there were other charges, e.g. he held it probable that the moon was inhabited.

At the assembly of 1716 the marrow-men clamoured for Simson's suspension, but the case was deferred till the next assembly, when Webster broke out (8 May 1717) with what Wodrow calls 'a dreadful sally.' At the next sitting he apologised. On 14 May 1717 the assembly found that Simson had 'vented some opinions not necessary to be taught in divinity,' and had employed expressions 'used by adversaries in a bad and unsound sense;' these were prohibited for the future, but no further censure was passed. The assembly was, in fact, being offered to choose between two extremes: on the same day judgment was given against the ‘Auchterarder creed’ (see Thomas Boston, the elder). Preaching at the outer church, Glasgow, on 19 May, Simson gave offence by allusions to his opponents.

Eight years later his orthodoxy on the point of Christ's deity was impeached. He admitted changes in his treatment of the topic. Up to 1722 he had taken John Owen as his model; for two years (1723–24) he had specially controverted the semi-Arian teaching of Samuel Clarke; finding that this course had its dangers, he began in December 1725 to combat the opposite error of Sabellianism, and was in consequence accused of going over to Samuel Clarke. He defended himself by affirming his judgment that, in the then state of Scottish theology, there was danger of Sabellianism and Socinianism, none of Arianism. His own account is closely confirmed by the evidence of his students. On 16 February 1726 Charles Coats, minister of Govan, brought the matter before the Glasgow presbytery, who drew up six queries, which Simson declined to answer. Delay was caused by the state of Simson's health. Wodrow thought him 'in a dying condition,' and that his disorder had affected his mental health. He was unable to attend the assembly of 1726. On 18 May 1727 the assembly suspended him till the next assembly, and appointed a committee of twenty-one ministers and ten elders to co-operate with the Glasgow presbytery in preparing the case. On 16 May 1728, after receiving Simson's explanations and withdrawals, the assembly found his sentiments to be 'sound and orthodox,' but his teaching had been 'subversive,' and his explanations tardy. He was suspended till another assembly should take off the sentence; meantime the matter was to be referred to the presbyteries. Charles Owen, D.D. was present at this assembly. The action of the University of Edinburg in conferring (8 November) its diploma of D.D. upon four non-subscribers, including Owen, was viewed as a protest against the suspension of Simson.

By the next assembly all the presbyteries but three or four had reported for Simson's deposition. Besides the 'marrow-men' a strenuous advocate for this course was Allan Logan (died 1733), minister of Culross. Finally, the suspension from all ecclesiastical function was confirmed on 13 May 1729. Simson was to retain the emoluments of his chair, though it was 'not fit or safe' that he should teach divinity.

His post at the University lay unfilled from 1729 until 1740, eventually being filled by Michael Potter.

After suspension, Simson signed a student's testimonial as S.T.P. No provision was made for the duties of his chair, save that the principal, Neil Campbell, heard the discourses of bursars. Simson died on 2 February 1740. He printed nothing except the papers connected with his trials. His correspondence with Rowan was printed by Webster, Edinburgh, 1715, for presentation to the assembly.

== Family ==
In October 1710 he married Jean Stirling, daughter of Rev James Stirling, minister of the Barony Church in Glasgow and a niece of John Stirling (1662–1727), principal of Glasgow College.

They had at least 14 children including a daughter, Jean Simson, who married (1757) John Moore, and was the mother of Sir John Moore of Coruña. His sister Agnes married another John Simson, and was mother of Robert Simson and of Thomas Simson.
