= Marrow Brethren =

Group inside Presbyterianism

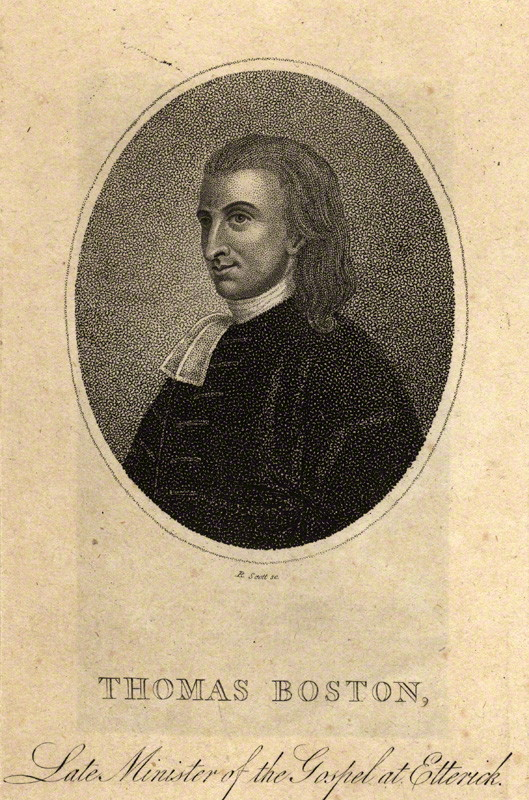
Thomas Boston

The Marrow Brethren, also called Marrowmen, were a group inside Presbyterianism. The name is derived from the book "Marrow of Modern Divinity", which caused a controversy in the Scottish Church, called the Marrow Controversy. The leading figures of the Marrow Brethren included Thomas Boston, Robert Riccaltoun, James Hog, John Williamson, James Bathgate, and Ebenezer Erskine along with the author of the Marrow, Edward Fisher. The General Assembly condemned the Marrow for being antinomian.

The teaching of the Marrow Brethren is called "Marrow theology", and they have influenced many Reformed thinkers even after their condemnation in Scotland.

== Beliefs ==
The Marrow of Modern Divinity criticized legalism while criticizing antinomianism, the Marrow argued that antinomianism and legalism, though being opposite to each other both are opposed to grace. They had a very high emphasis on the doctrine of justification by faith alone, they highly opposed the doctrine of Neonomianism which saw acts of obedience as meritorious. A common claim of the Marrowmen was that Neonomianism made the New Covenant into a Covenant of Works.

The Marrow Brethren, though rejecting universal atonement, held to a strong view of common grace and that in some way God desires the salvation of all. They sought to clear the gospel out of any other conditions other than faith. The Marrow Brethren denied that actions such as repentance, with either inward or outward reformation are necessary to receive salvation but saw them as naturally flowing from receiving Christ. They saw high Calvinism as "misguided" and sought to defend the free offer of the gospel against the Assembly.

The Marrow Brethren taught the republication of the covenant of works, meaning that they saw the Mosaic covenant as having a works principle republished from the original Covenant of Works. They saw the distinction of Law and Gospel as vital to the Gospel itself. While the critics of the Marrow argued that being in the Covenant of Grace did not make the duties of the Covenant of Works unnecessary.

The Marrow had a high emphasis on the possibility of assurance, seeing the work of Christ as the foundation of the believer's assurance, while the general Assembly emphasized the human element in having assurance.

== Influence ==
Marrow beliefs formed the basis of the Secession churches, which still continue as Associate Reformed Presbyterian churches. The Marrow along with the writings of the Marrow Brethren were translated into Dutch, which caused their views to influence many Reformed churches and theologians in the Netherlands. The Marrow also had influence on some later Presbyterian writers such as John Colquhoun.

R. Scott Clark, a professor in Westminster Seminary California has defended the Marrow Brethren, saying: "The Marrow of Modern Divinity was regarded by the orthodox Reformed, in the 17th century, as a good summary of the orthodox view of law and gospel, justification, sanctification, and the third (normative) use of the law in the life of the Christian."

== See also ==
- Neonomianism
- Lordship salvation controversy
