= Thomas Boston the younger =

Scottish minister (1713–1767)

Reverend Thomas Boston the younger
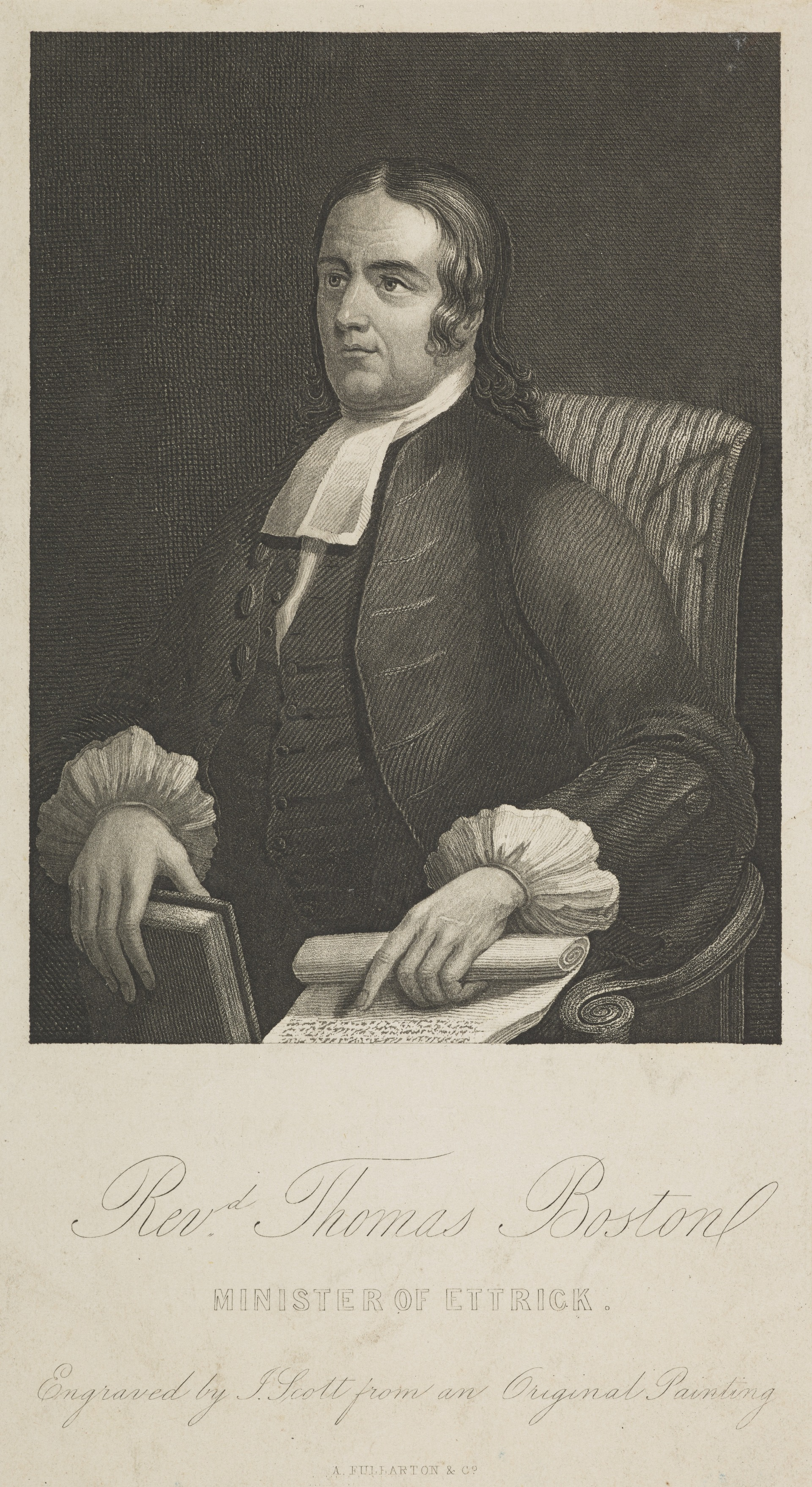
- Born: 3 April 1713; Ettrick, Scottish Borders
- Died: 13 February 1767 (aged 53); Jedburgh, Scottish Borders
- Occupation: Minister of religion

Thomas Boston, the younger (1713–1767) was a Scottish minister of the Relief Church.

== Early life ==
The youngest son of Thomas Boston (1676–1732), he was born at Ettrick on 3 April 1713. After some home instruction, he went to the grammar school at Hawick, and then to Edinburgh University. Boston was licensed on 1 August 1732 by the Selkirk presbytery, presented to Ettrick in place of his father in November 1732, and ordained there on 4 April 1733. As father and son were successive ministers in the same location, portraits of both men are frequently confused due to the inscription "Minister of Ettrick". On 25 October 1748 he was released from the charge, having a call to Oxnam, Roxburghshire; and was admitted there on 10 August 1749.

== The "relief" presbytery ==
Popular as the heir to his father's theology of the Marrow Controversy, Boston was the immediate cause of a rift in the parish church of the neighbouring town of Jedburgh. When a vacancy there was filled over the wishes of the congregation, the elders of the church and most of the parishioners, including the town council, withdrew from the church and built a meeting-house for Boston.

John Bonar, who had been appointed to Jedburgh, did not take up the post. Boston tendered his demission to the presbytery on 7 December 1757. On 30 May 1758 the General Assembly of the Church of Scotland accepted his demission, and in doing so declared him henceforth incapable of receiving a presentation; and prohibited all ministers from employing him in any office.

Boston then continued his ministry at Jedburgh as an Independent. In 1761 he and Thomas Gillespie joined in admitting Thomas Colier as minister to a congregation at Colinsburgh. The three constituted themselves into a new body, the "Presbytery of Relief". Boston was its first moderator. In 1765 he went to Glasgow, on trial as a minister to a Relief congregation there, but was not called.

The new organisation, which became the Relief Church, initially did not consider itself opposed to the Church of Scotland. In 1773, six years after Boston's death, the relief presbytery formed itself into a "Synod of Relief".

== Death and family ==
Boston died at Jedburgh on 13 February 1767 and is buried in Jedburgh Abbey. He had married on 26 April 1738 Elizabeth Anderson, who died at Dysart on 21 June 1787. His son Michael was minister of the relief congregation at Falkirk; his daughter Christiana, married Dr. Tucker Harris, of Charlestown, South Carolina.

== Works ==
Boston's publications consisted of four single sermons, of which the first was printed in 1745, the last in 1762. His Select Discourses on a variety of practical subjects, Glasgow, 1768, were issued posthumously. Some of these are in Select Sermons by Boston and James Baine, with introductory essay by Neil McMichael, Edinburgh 1850.
