= Thomas Gillespie (minister) =

Scottish minister (1708–1774)

Thomas Gillespie (1708 – 19 January 1774) was a Scottish minister of the Church of Scotland. He was founder of the Synod of Relief. Thomas Gillespie, born in 1708, at Clearburn, Duddingston, was the son of a well-to-do brewer and bonnet-laird — the only son of a second marriage. An interview with Thomas Boston, arranged by his mother, turned his thoughts to the ministry.

On the completion of his Arts course in Edinburgh, he entered the Divinity Hall. After some months, however, he left for the Divinity Hall of the Secession Church in Perth. A few weeks’ experience of its narrowness being more than enough, he betook himself to Northampton to complete his studies under Philip Doddridge. He was ordained by a "classis" of the English Presbyterians. Presented and called to Carnock, he was inducted by the Presbytery of Dunfermline in 1741. In the early years of his ministry he was a leader in the Cambuslang and Kilsyth Revivals, and became a trusted correspondent of George Whitfield and Jonathan Edwards. Taking his stand, with the majority of the Presbytery, against the Inverkeithing Intrusion, he was summarily deposed by the General Assembly of 1752.

In 1761, with two other ministers and their flocks, he formed a new body — the Presbytery of Relief, which had attained a quite considerable place in many parts of Scotland, by the time of his death in 1774.

== Early life ==
Gillespie was born at Clearburn Farm, in the parish of Duddingston, Edinburgh (then part of Midlothian). His father, Thomas Gillespie (1688-1712), was a farmer who died when Thomas was young, and his mother, Mary Haliburton (1689-1758), ran the family farm and brewery. She encouraged him to hear Thomas Boston the elder preach.

After a period in the family businesses, Gillespie studied at the University of Edinburgh from 1732. In 1738 he went north to attend the seminary run at Perth by William Wilson (1690–1741) of the Secession Church; but was not impressed and moved on after a short while. He then went to Philip Doddridge at Northampton in 1740, with a recommendation signed by 12 Scottish ministers, five of whom were "Marrow Men". There he was ordained in January 1741. He ministered at Hartbarrow in Lancashire, and September 1741 was admitted minister of the parish of Carnock, Fife ander the patronage of Col Erskine. The presbytery of Dunfermline agreed to sustain as valid the ordination he had received in England, and to allow a qualification of his subscription to the church's doctrinal symbol, so far as it had reference to the sphere of the civil magistrate in matters of religion.

== 1740s revival ==
Gillespie was closely involved in the religious revivalism of the 1740s in Lanarkshire, at Kilsyth and Cambuslang. It was associated with the preaching of George Whitefield in Glasgow in 1741–2, and was taken up as a phenomenon by John Erskine, The Signs of the Times Consider'd (1742). The local ministers involved were William McCulloch at Cambuslang, and James Robe at Kilsyth. The evangelical John Maclaurin was drawn in from outside, as was Gillespie, who edited the conversion testimonies collected by McCulloch.

Maclaurin and Robe wrote to Jonathan Edwards in New England, in 1742. In ensuing correspondence, Gillespie was in touch with Edwards from 1746/7.

== The Inverkeithing case ==
Gillespie absented himself from presbytery meetings held to ordain Andrew Richardson, an unacceptable presentee, as minister of Inverkeithing, in southern Fife not far from Carnock. He was then deposed by the General Assembly of the Church of Scotland of 1752. for maintaining that the refusal of the local presbytery to act in this case was justified.

The context was the rise of the Moderate Party of the Church of Scotland, from 1751, led by William Robertson with a group of younger ministers including Hugh Blair, Alexander Carlyle and John Home. They came to an influential position in the Assembly in 1752, on a platform of the Assembly's right to adjudicate in patronage disputes. John Erskine, on the other hand, became a leader of the "Popular Party" opposing the Moderates. The opposition was also variously known as the High Flyers, Wild Party, or later as Evangelicals.

== After the deposition ==
John Witherspoon wrote the anonymous Ecclesiastical Characteristics (1753) to satirise the Moderates, and James Baine became a supporter of Gillespie. Gillespie himself continued to preach, first at Carnock, and then in nearby Dunfermline. There Ralph Erskine died in 1752, and his congregation of the Secession Church sought over a period to have Gillespie as replacement. The Town Council came to support Gillespie, against the local Moderate minister James Thomson.

In 1756, John Bonar received a presentation to the church of Jedburgh, from William Kerr, 4th Marquess of Lothian. He was unable to take it up, however, in the face of strong local opposition, from supporters of Thomas Boston the younger. Boston was minister at Oxnam, just outside Jedburgh, and had the support of the Town Council. The Marquess was on good terms with Selina, Countess of Huntingdon, and supported George Whitefield; his objection to the evangelical Boston was personal, rather than theological. When John Douglas was nominated instead of Bonar, Boston persisted, but lost out. In 1759 Gillespie visited Boston in the Lowlands, to give support after he resigned his ministry at Oxnam.

== The Relief Church ==
In 1761, with Thomas Boston of Jedburgh, and Thomas Colier at Colinsburgh, Gillespie formed a distinct communion under the name of the "Presbytery of Relief"—relief, that is to say, from patronage and the church courts.

The foundation arose from a further dispute, at Kilconquhar in Fifeshire, over a presentation made by the James Lindsay, 5th Earl of Balcarres, when the minister James Clidsdale died in 1759, and Balcarres nominated John Chalmers as successor. Witherspoon criticised the imposition of Chalmers over local feelings, when in 1760 the General Assembly backed him. Shortly there was a secession from the congregation of Kilconquhar, meeting at Colinsburgh. Gillespie became involved, first suggesting Thomas Scott of Hexham as minister for the seceders, who was in poor health and declined. In 1761, Gillespie visited Colinsburgh, and paved the way for Colier, a native of Fife, who became minister there. His induction by Boston and Gillespie marked the beginning of the "Presbytery of Relief".

Early expansions of the Presbytery were after secessions at Blairlogie (where William Cruden was rejected by the General Synod in 1760, and Auchtermuchty where Thomas Scott of Hexham came as minister in 1763. As the 1760s proceeded, congregations joined at Duns, Scottish Borders and Bellshill, where Gillespie preached in 1762. James Baine took an Edinburgh church, Lady Yester's, for the Presbytery at the end of 1766, inducted by Gillespie, over the claims of William Cruden; who went to a Glasgow church in 1767 after Boston had died.

From 1769 the Relief Church, as it had become after further rapid growth, experienced internal tensions. Gillespie was believed to favour a reconciliation with the Church of Scotland, and began to distance himself, but on his death in 1774, the Relief Church maintained its independence. It eventually became one of the communions combining to form the United Presbyterian Church of Scotland.

== Works ==
- A Just View of the Constitution of the Church of Scotland (n.p., 1752) [answered by A Juster View (Edinburgh, 1753) ]
- An Essay on the Continuance of Immediate Revelations of Facts and Future Events in the Christian Church [containing a Letter by James Cuthbert, minister of Culross, and a Preface by John Erskine, D.D.] (Edinburgh, 1771)
- A Treatise on Temptation [Preface by John Erskine, D.D.] (Edinburgh, 1774). — [See A Letter from several Elders, Lovers of Peace and Moderation, upon the Deposing of T. G. (n.p., 1752)
- A Speech concerning the Reponing of Thomas Gillespie (n.p., 1753)
- An Inquiry into the Powers committed to the General Assemblies of this Church, and the Nature of Deposition from the Holy Ministry, occasioned by the Conduct and Procedure of the Assembly 1752, by the author of the "Queries" in the Scots Magazine for July 1752, with an Introduction by another hand (Glasgow, 1754)

Gillespie's only literary works were an Essay on the Continuation of Immediate Revelations in the Church, and a Practical Treatise on Temptation. Both works appeared posthumously (1774). In the former he argued that immediate revelations are no longer vouchsafed to the church; in the latter he traced temptation to the work of a personal devil.

== Family ==
On 19 November 1744, he married Margaret Riddell daughter of Dr John Riddell, physician, of Edinburgh. She died on 19 November 1744 without issue.

== Notes ==
Attribution

== Bibliography ==
- The Case of the Rev. Thomas Gillespie [by Thomas Boston] (n.p., 1770)
- The Case of the Rev. Thomas Gillespie reviewed (Edinburgh, 1770)
- Sermons preached at Dunfermline on the Death of the Rev. Thomas Gillespie [by James Cowan, minister at Colinsburgh] (1796)
- Lives of Ebenezer Erskine, William Wilson, and Thomas Gillespie, Fathers of the U.P. Church [Life of Gillespie by William Lindsay, D.D.] (Edinburgh, 1849)
- The History and Principles of the First Constituted Presbytery of Relief, by the Surviving Members of said Presb. (Edinburgh, 1795)
- Struthers's History, of the Relief Church, 1839
- M'Kelvie's Annals of the U.P. Church
- Small's Hist, of U.P. Congs., i., 358
- Alex. Carlyle's Autobiography
- Cunningham's Hist, of the Secession and Relief Churches in Dunfermline (Dunfermline, 1899)
- Dictionary of National Biography
