= Geddie =

Geddie is a surname. Notable people with the surname include:

- Bill Geddie (1955–2023), American television producer
- Emelia Geddie (1665– 1681), Scottish Presbyterian child prophet
- Glynn Geddie (born 1990), British racing driver
- John Geddie (disambiguation), multiple people
- Rufus Geddie Herring (1921–1996), American Navy officer and Medal of Honor recipient
