= Michael Potter (minister) =

17th c. parish minister

Orders
- Ordination: St. Ninians 1673

Personal details
- Born: c. 1642
- Died: 1718 (aged c. 76)
- Denomination: Christian
- Children: Michael
- Education: University of Edinburgh

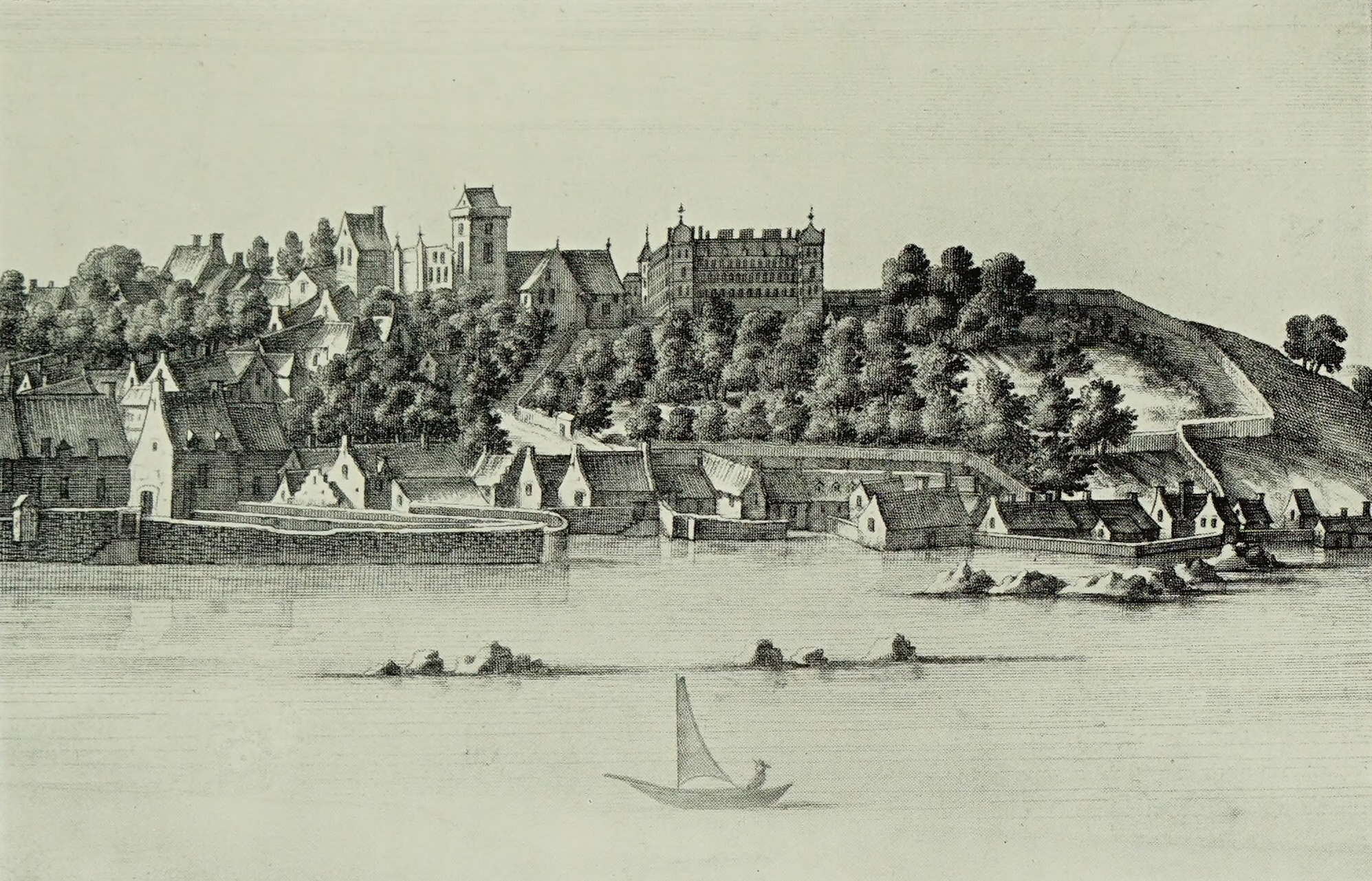
Culross from the Forth

Michael Potter (c. 1642 - 1718) was a covenanter. He graduated from Edinburgh on 27 July 1663. He was licensed to preach the gospel in 1673. He was a tutor to the family of George, the Laird of Dunglass of that ilk. He was ordained by presbytery for the adherents in the parish of St. Ninians in 1673. He was elected a schoolmaster to Culross by the magistrates. This led to them being summoned before the Privy Council in 1677.

== Retreat to Holland ==
After this, the fury of the persecution drove him to Holland for shelter at two different times.

== Arrest ==
He returned from his second retreat to that country in 1680, and was apprehended about November 1681 in his own house at Borrowstounness, whence he was carried to Blackness Castle the first night, and the next day to the tolbooth of Edinburgh. There he continued a close prisoner till early in the year 1683, when by the orders of the Council he was carried to the Bass Rock for keeping conventicles, for disorderly ordination, and for refusing to engage to live orderly in future. He entered this dungeon in February, 1683; preaching at conventicles was his only crime. Potter was imprisoned in Edinburgh and on the Bass Rock and was only released on 17 March 1685 under Act of Banishment thereby leaving the kingdom. However, after remaining quiet at home he gained the liberty granted by King James VII which relieved him from the necessity of obeying the sentence.

== On release ==
After the Glorious Revolution, he was first minister of Bo'ness from 7 December 1687, and then of Dunblane Cathedral 1692; he was also a member of the assembly that year. He died in 1718 sometime between 28 October and 25 November aged 76. The New Statistical Account lists him as being called to Ecclesmachan in 1693 before he was called to Dunblane.

He had a son, Michael Potter (1670-1743), who was first minister at Kippen, and afterwards in 1740 filled the long empty chair vacated by Mr John Simson in 1729 as Professor of Divinity in the University of Glasgow, but did not long fill that chair, having died in November 1743. His granddaughter married James Baine, of the Relief Church.

== Bibliography ==
- Wodrow's History
- New Statistical Account of Scotland, ii.
- Crichton's Memoirs of Blackadder
- Dickson's Emeralds Chased in Gold.
