= Robert Riccaltoun =

Scottish minister

Robert Riccaltoun (1691-1769) was a minister in the Church of Scotland at Hobkirk, Roxburghshire. He was one of the leading figures of the Marrow Brethren, and was known for "correcting misinterpretations of the Marrow of Modern Divinity given by its opponents". Riccaltoun was a critic of James Hadow.

== Personal life ==
Riccaltoun was born in 1691 at Earlshaugh, his father was a farmer. He was educated at the University of Edinburgh and ordained in 1725, remaining a minister for his whole life.
