= Mackail =

Mackail is a surname. Notable people with the surname include:

- Craig Mackail-Smith (born 1984), British footballer
- Denis Mackail (1892–1971), English writer
- Hugh Mackail (c. 1640–1666), Scottish martyr
- John William Mackail (1859–1945), Scottish man of letters

== See also ==
- McKail, Western Australia, a suburb of Albany
- John McKail (1810–1871), an early settler of Western Australia
