= Auchterarder Creed =

The Auchterarder Creed was the pejorative term given to a declaration formulated by the Church of Scotland presbytery in Auchterarder in 1717.

The creed is formulated in one short sentence as follows:

"It is not sound and orthodox to teach that we must forsake sin in order to our coming to Christ."

The import of the creed is that it was unorthodox to teach that one must repent prior to coming to Christ, meaning that the Auchterarder Presbytery saw repentance as a result of being in Christ instead of an instrumental requirement for salvation. The creed was condemned by the General Assembly of the Church of Scotland in 1717, saying that one could only be saved after a person had gotten rid of their sins through repentance.

The condemnation was opposed by Thomas Boston, who in response recommended the reading of the Marrow of Modern Divinity, having similar doctrines to the Auchterarder. This then resulted in the Marrow being reprinted in Scotland and igniting the Marrow Controversy.
