= Patrick Hutchison =

Scottish Presbyterian minister (1741–1802)

Patrick Hutchison (1741–1802) was a Presbyterian minister who produced the first systematic definition of the beliefs of the Relief Church in Scotland.

== Early life and religious loyalties ==
Hutchison was born on 3 January 1741 into a farming family at Dunblane where his father was an elder of the Anti-burgher Church of the First Secession. Raised in that communion, he initially accepted its teaching without hesitation but, in circumstances that are unclear, came to question its principles. Concluding that some of these had no basis in Scripture, and dismayed by what he saw as the Anti-burghers’ preference for narrow dogma over moral conscience, he joined the Relief Church. By 1770 he had been licensed by the Relief Presbytery and appointed assistant to Dr James Baine, minister at College Street, Edinburgh, one of the fathers of the Relief. As a ruling elder of College Street he attended the first Relief Synod in May 1773.

== Ministry ==
In November 1774 he was inducted as first Relief minister at St. Ninians, near Stirling. There he was on terms of close friendship with Rev. Alexander Pirie, in whose church at Blairlogie he frequently preached and in debate with whom he refined his judgement on topics of ministerial concern. During his eight years at St. Ninians he became one of Scotland's foremost religious controversialists, publishing for the first time tracts systematically setting out what were the doctrinal beliefs of the Relief communion and why they were scripturally correct when different from those of other Presbyterian denominations.

He largely withdrew from the printed fray in May 1783 upon removing to become minister at Paisley, a rapidly expanding town that required greater pastoral attention. But he still courted controversy with outspoken calls for political reform and for an end to the war with France, resulting in a rift within his congregation in 1796.

His preaching style was variously described as “warm and energetic” and “masculine, eloquent and impressive”, and he accepted invitations to preach across the west of Scotland such that his very name became “a tower of strength for his denomination”. He continued at Paisley until his death, by which time his large church there was regularly “full to overflowing”.

== Writings ==
By 1779 the Relief was under attack from both Burghers and Anti-burghers, and Hutchison took it upon himself to hold the Relief's corner in print, publishing A Compendious View of the Religious System maintained by the Synod of Relief. This put at the heart of the system principles of independence of church from patronage and civil authority, toleration and friendly communion between all Protestant persuasions, and rejection of conventions (in particular, submission to the Solemn League of Covenant) that would, as Hutchison saw it, exclude Christ's apostles from membership of the church of the First Secession.

The Burgher Synod replied with a pamphlet denouncing the Relief as unprincipled in its fellowship and conducive to immorality, to which Hutchison responded with A Few Animadversions on the Re-exhibition of Burgher-Testimony, and in 1780 he published A Dissertation on the Nature and Genius of the Kingdom of Christ, asserting that the form of the church should be consistent with its first foundation as described in the New Testament.

Ministers of other persuasions circulated papers containing further charges against the Relief, to which Hutchison issued a refutation in 1781. He wrote in vehement terms (referring to “detestable lies” by “viperous bigots”). This probably increased the appeal and circulation of his tracts, and they ran to several editions.

In 1788 he produced Three Discourses on the Divine and Mediatorial Character of Jesus Christ, described by Dr Struthers, the historian of the Relief Church, as “truly masterly discourses, determined by that breadth of intellect, and that fervour of mind, which so remarkably distinguished their author”. In 1803, following his death, a volume containing sixteen of his sermons was printed and this continued to be reissued into the 1840s.

== Relief hymnbook ==
Hutchison believed that the singing of hymns, and not simply Psalms (as was then the general practice), should be a vital part of worship, and in 1793 he printed for use by his congregation Sacred Songs and Hymns on Various Passages of Scripture. To be sung in the Worship of God. This adopted the selection of one hundred and eighty psalms and hymns previously printed by Rev. James Stewart for his Anderston, Glasgow, congregation but added a further fifty-one hymns (including twenty by Isaac Watts and five by Charles Wesley) chosen by Hutchison. In this he seems to have acted in conjunction with his brother-in-law, Rev. James Dun, who had the same compilation printed for the Relief congregation at Campbell Street, Glasgow: both editions carried a Preface by Hutchison justifying the use of hymns in public worship. In 1794 the compilation was adopted by the Relief Synod as the church's first hymn-book and it continued unrevised until 1825.

== Legacy ==
In 1843 Struthers opined that “To Mr Hutchison, more than to any other author of the last century, the religious public of Scotland is indebted for correct and scriptural views of the constitution of the church of Christ”. By that year initiatives were already afoot that, in 1847, saw the (now combined) Burgher and Anti-burgher denominations merge with the Relief to form the United Presbyterian Church, a communion that was liberal in instinct, evangelical in practice, concerned to redefine its relationship with civil institutions, and committed to congregational singing. Its principles closely resembled those adumbrated by Hutchison, and when the history of the United Presbyterian Church came to be written in 1904 (shortly after its unification with the Free Church), the author credited him with having “reasoned out principles of permanent value in the ecclesiastical world”.

== Death and family ==
Hutchison died at Paisley on 10 January 1802, “regretted by his own congregation and by many Christians of different denominations”. He had married, in 1779, Helen Graham of Tamrawer, who died in 1809. They had seven sons, of whom three conducted the muslin manufacturing business of James Hutchison & Co., once among the largest textile concerns in Glasgow. Of these three, James (1780–1862) was Glasgow's Dean of Guild in 1833, Robert (1782–1862) amassed perhaps the city's finest private art collection, and Graham (1795–1858) acquired the Craigton House estate; all were Glasgow City Councillors in 1843.
