= John Bonar =

John Bonar may refer to:

- John Bonar (set decorator) (1886–1963), American set decorator
- John Bonar (minister) (1721–1761), Church of Scotland minister
