= Shaws Lane Chapel =

Coordinates: 55.77027°N 2.00276°W

This map shows the location of the Chapel on Shaws Lane

Shaws Lane Relief Chapel in Berwick upon Tweed was founded in 1756 by a Presbyterian group seceding from the Low Meeting House in Hide Hill. The Congregation were of the Church of Scotland but preferred to choose their own Minister and so they pooled what money they had or could raise in order to fund its construction. The Relief Capel is situated between the High Street and Shaws Lane near the eastern extremity of Shaws Lane.

== Ministers ==
The Ministers at Shaws Lane Relief Chapel were as follows,

- Reverend Andrew Thomson 1785 - 1814
- Reverend Robert Hall 1814 - 1835. Robert Hall was from Dundee and not to be confused with any other Rev R Hall.

== History ==
It was opened in 1757. and is the only Meeting House in Berwick still intact from that Century.

Shaws Lane Berwick was later renamed as Chapel Street Berwick because of this Chapel, and the Chapel itself became better known as the Middle Meeting House to differentiate it from The High Meeting House and The Low Meeting House.

The building remained as a Chapel until 1917 when the congregation joined with the Church Street Presbyterian Church to form St Aidan's Presbyterian Church of England. Since that time the chapel has been used as a bakery and an Electrical wholesalers.
