= Katherine Ross (died 1697) =

- Born: 1635; Edinburgh
- Died: 10 July 1697; Edinburgh

Katherine Ross born Katherine Collace (1635 – 10 July 1697) was a Scottish Covenanter, memoirist and schoolmistress.

== Life ==
Ross was born in Edinburgh in about 1635. Her parents were Marion (born Muirhead) and Francis Collace. Her father was the minister of Gordon and he died when she was about twelve. Her four sisters included Elizabeth and the writer Jean Collace. When she was about fourteen she was converted by the eventual martyr Hugh Mackail who was then the minister at Trinity in Edinburgh.

On 31 January 1650, she married the "wicked" John Ross. They had twelve children, but none of them survived. Katherine summarised her marriage as "24 years of affliction". By 1667 and after the assistance of Thomas Hog she was radical about her religion. She had become a follower of the Covenanters who believed that they should follow the lead of the Presbyterians.

Ross' husband died in 1674 and she and her sister Jean moved to Fife and the village of Falkland. The two of them became schoolmistresses nominally teaching needlework to the children of the local gentry, but it is speculated that they were also providing religious guidance, such as to Emelia Geddie. Ross was well read and a good writer. She was asked to record her life and her religious experiences.

In 1679, the Battle of Bothwell Bridge took place on 22 June 1679. Government troops defeated militant Presbyterian Covenanters. Ross was one of these Covenanters but she did not support this level of militancy.

Ross died in Edinburgh on 10 July 1697. In 1735 her "Memoirs or spiritual exercises" were arranged to be formally published by the minister James Hog, although there are three manuscript copies extant which show that her writings were distributed before this.
