= St Ninians =

Suburb of Stirling, Scotland

Coordinates: 56.103°N 3.939°W

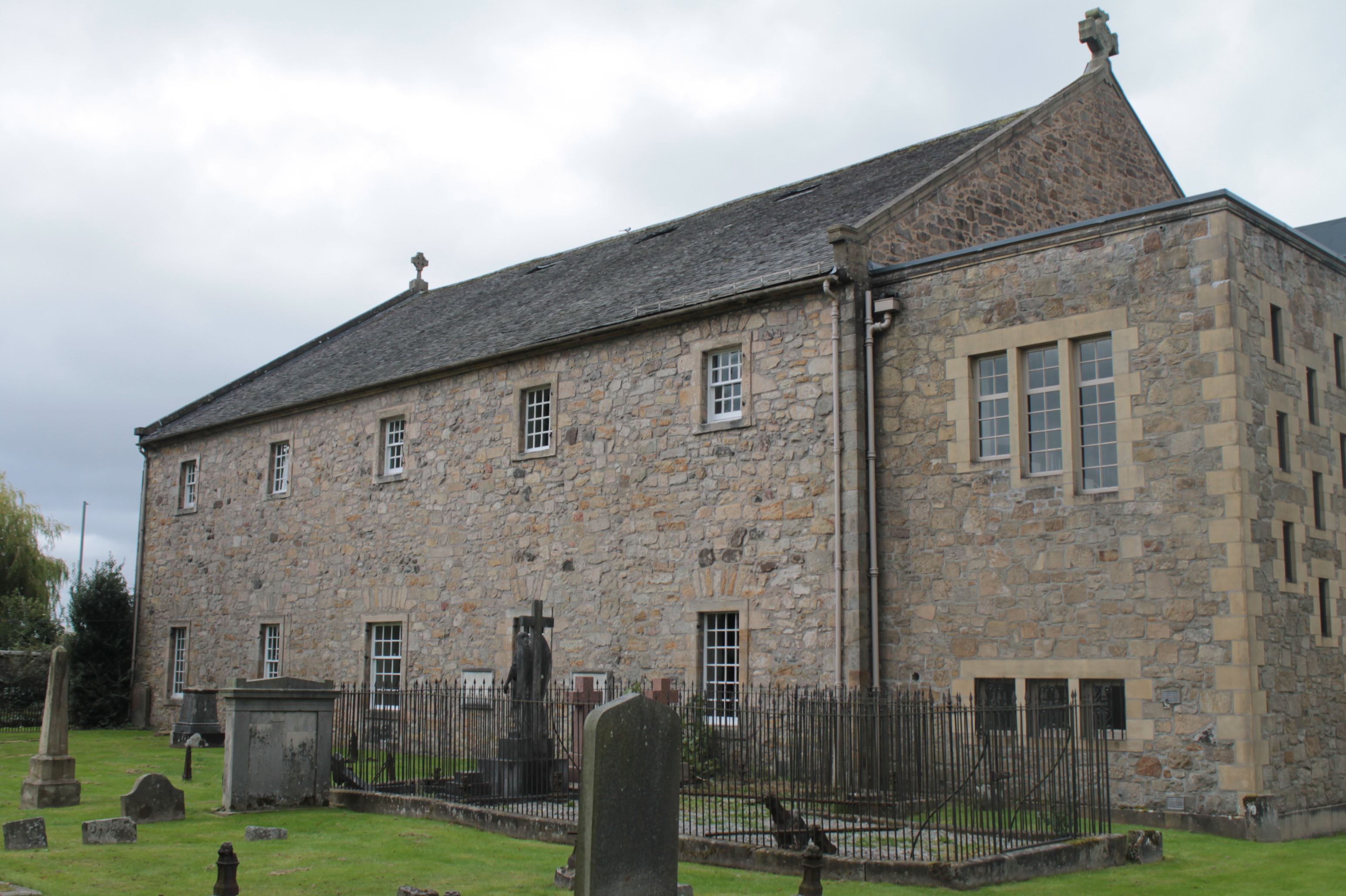
St Ninian's church south of Stirling (north)

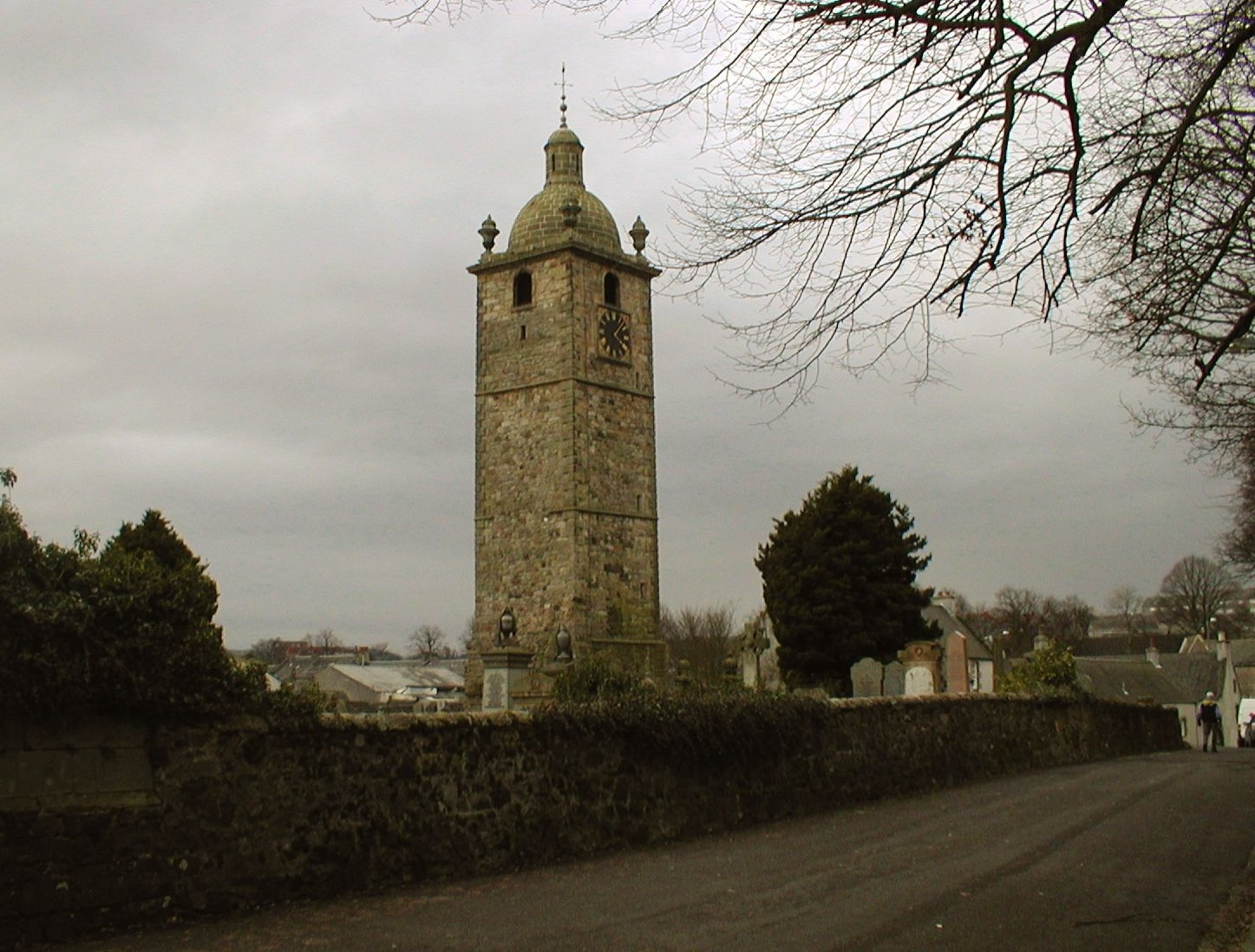
The steeple following restoration

St. Ninians is a long-standing settlement which is now a district of the city of Stirling in central Scotland. It is located approximately one mile south of the city centre. It was originally known as Eccles (i.e. 'church'), and may have been a Christian site from an unusually early date (possibly 5th or 6th century). Later called 'St. Ringan's' (a variant of St Ninian's). This church was the administrative centre for churches across the strath of the River Forth.

== Church ==
A document dating from 1147 refers to "the church of Egglis St Ninians with its chapels of Dunipace and Lithbert".

The famous fight between the forces of Sir Thomas Randolph, 1st Earl of Moray and Sir Robert de Clifford, 1st Baron de Clifford on the first day of the Battle of Bannockburn on 23 June, 1314 is generally placed at St. Ninian's Kirk.

During the Siege of Stirling Castle, part of the 1745 Jacobite rising, the church was used to store munitions and this blew up when the Jacobites began retreating on 1 February 1746. Despite claims it was deliberate, it was more likely simply due to carelessness. Only the tower survived; it was later restored and can be seen to this day.

A few years after the Church was rebuilt it became the scene of another drama. The local landowner 'presented' a new minister, Mr Thomson of Gargunnock. He was not chosen by the heads of families and a dispute arose. After years of wrangling the Presbytery was forced to appoint him. The Moderator of Presbytery addressed these words to him

"Sir, we are met here this day, by a former appointment of Presbytery, in obedience to the same sentence of the General Assembly, to admit you minister of St. Ninians- a sentence pronounced by the highest horn of ecclesiastical authority or power. That Assembly have assumed to themselves higher power than the Parliament-by some profanely styled omnipotent-that wise, that august body, never enacting any laws without consent of the people. There has been a formidable opposition made against you by six hundred heads of families, sixty heritors, and all the elders of the parish, I believe, except one. This opposition has continued for seven years by your own obstinacy, and if you should this day be admitted, you can have no pastoral relation to the souls of the parish; you will never be regarded as the shepherd to go before the sheep-they know you not, and they will never follow you; and, let me assure you, dear sir, if you persist in your obstinacy, you will do more harm in this parish than you could have done good in Gargunnock though you had been to live there for a hundred years; and you will draw misery and contempt upon yourself-you will be despised-you will be hated-you will be insulted and maltreated. One of the most eloquent and learned ministers of this Church told me lately that he would go twenty miles to see you deposed; and I do assure you, sir, that I, and twenty thousand more friends to our Church, would do the same. You maintained a good character and reputation till your unhappy And obstinate adherence to this presentation. Now, bending under the weight of years and infirmities of old age, what happiness can you propose to yourself in this mad, this desperate attempt of yours, without the concurrence of the people, and without the least prospect of usefulness in the parish. Your admission into it, therefore, can only be regarded as a sinecure, and you yourself as Stipend-Lifter of St. Ninians. Now, sir, I conjure you, by the mercies of God, give up this presentation. I conjure you, for the sake of the great number of souls in St. Ninians, and by that peace of mind which you would wish in a dying hour, and that awful and impartial account which in a little you must give to God of your own soul, and of the souls of this parish, at the tribunal of our Lord Jesus Christ, give it up."

He did not give up and so was inducted.

Of the twenty-one elders of the parish, one remained loyal to the old Church; the others left its walls. They, along with the majority of the people, formed a Relief Church. Rev. Patrick Hutchison was the first minister of the Relief congregation, from 1774 to 1783.

In the disruption of 1843 a Free Church of Scotland was formed. This congregation eventually returned to the Church of Scotland and became known as St George's. In 1969 it was dissolved and the building eventually demolished to make way for housing. The Relief congregation originally at the 'toll' continues today as St Ninians United Free Church of Scotland.

In recent years, the old steeple, which was built in 1734 but houses a 17th-century bell, became structurally unsafe but has been restored, with funding from St. Ninians Old Parish Church, local community donations, and Historic Scotland. As it stands, this tower appears to be a late 17th- to early 18th-century structure, but is likely to be of much earlier origin (possibly 11th-12th century). In October 2017, one of the gateways and part of the wall to the Category A listed graveyard was demolished in a collision with a vehicle.

== Notable people ==
- Sir George Frederick Harvey FRSE RSA (1806–1876), a Scottish painter.
- James Thomson (1854–after 1892), a Scottish-born miller and political figure in Manitoba
- Sir Peter Mackie, 1st Baronet JP (1855–1924), a Scottish whisky distiller and writer.
- Frank Beattie (1933–2009), a Scottish football player and manager, with 422 club caps with Kilmarnock F.C.

== Industry ==
During the 19th century, St. Ninians' main industry was nail-making, employing more than 100 people, with the main works located at the corner of Weaver Row and Main Street (known locally as Nailworks Corner). This site is now the location of a Lidl supermarket.

== Traffic diversion ==
In the early 20th century, traffic was diverted away from the Main Street into Borestone Crescent and the Borestone Roundabout, which carries the main traffic from Glasgow, Edinburgh and Falkirk into Stirling. In the 1960s, most of this traffic was again diverted on to the Inner Relief Road from an enlarged Borestone Roundabout.

== Housing and shops ==
The area is served by a strip of shops and take-aways and other amenities next to the busy Borestone Roundabout, known locally as "the toll". Housing in the area is predominantly council or ex-council, with a mixture of terraced houses and flats.
