= Human Nature in Its Fourfold State =

Book by Thomas Boston

Human Nature in its Fourfold State is a 1720 book by Scottish Presbyterian theologian and philosopher Thomas Boston. It was extremely popular and influential in 18th century Scotland.

== Theory on human nature ==
Boston organizes human nature into four aspects: Primitive Integrity, Entire Depravity, Begun Recovery, and Consummate Happiness or Misery. They correspond to Augustine of Hippo's four own figured states: able to sin (posse peccare), not able not to sin (non posse non peccare), able not to sin (posse non peccare), unable to sin (non posse peccare).

== Impact ==
Sinclair Ferguson notes that "the book became virtually synonymous with the evangelical tradition in Scotland and could be found in many homes along with a family Bible, the Shorter Catechism, and a copy of John Bunyan's Pilgrim's Progress." Philip Ryken notes that it was "the most frequently published Scottish book of the eighteenth century, going through nearly 60 editions by 1800 and over one hundred editions in all."
