= George Hadow =

George Hadow (4 July 1712 – 11 September 1780) was professor of Hebrew and oriental languages at St Mary's College, University of St Andrews, Scotland from 1748 to 1780. He was the son of Principal James Hadow, also of St Andrews' University.

== Life ==
At the age of 15 Hadow won the Silver arrow for archery at St Andrews. It is inscribed "Georguis Hadow Aetat XV" and "Nec opinato Victor 1727". The latter confirms he was the unexpected winner of the competition.

Hadow was educated at the University of St Andrews, where he "came up" in 1727 and matriculated on the 26 March 1728. He received his Master of Arts on the 4 May 1731 and his M.D. on the 20 June 1740. He married Susanna Scott on the 30 December 1754. Susanna Scott was the great grand daughter of Sir Archibald Hope. He died at St Andrews, Fife, Scotland.

A small portrait of George Hadow is in a private collection in England.

== Notable descendants ==
- Major-General Frederick Edward Hadow, present at the Indian Mutiny
- Douglas Robert Hadow, who died during the descent after the first ascent of the Matterhorn in 1865
- Gilbert Bethune Hadow, a British army doctor present throughout the siege of Lucknow
- Patrick Francis Hadow, English Wimbledon tennis champion and big game hunter
- Sir William Henry Hadow, musician at Oxford University
- Lieutenant-Colonel Arthur Lovell Hadow, who was commanding the Royal Newfoundland Regiment on the day of its destruction on the first day of the Battle of the Somme
- Gerald Edgcumbe Hadow, Christian missionary to Tanzania
- Pen Hadow, explorer
