= John Colquhoun (minister) =

John Colquhoun (1 January, 1748 – 27 November, 1827) was a Scottish minister.

== Life ==
He was born on a farm estate belonging to Sir James Colquhoun (no relation) near Luss on Loch Lomond. Relatively late in life for the period, he enrolled at Glasgow University in 1768. He studied first for a general Arts degree then studied Theology including a term at Edinburgh University.

He was licensed to preach by the Presbytery of Glasgow in August 1780 and ordained as minister in the Church of Scotland in 1781, and served in just one church, St John's in South Leith, for 45 years.

He was twice married but had no children. He died in Leith on 27 November 1827 and was buried in South Leith Parish Churchyard.

Colquhoun wrote a number of books: Spiritual Comfort (1813), Law and Gospel (1815), The Covenant of Grace (1818), The Covenant of Works (1822), Saving Faith (1824), The Promises (1825), and Evangelical Repentance (1826). Sinclair Ferguson suggests that in his day he may have been the leading evangelical minister in the Church of Scotland. Theologically, he was influenced by the Marrowmen.
