= United Presbyterian Church (Scotland) =

Formed 1847 by the union of the United Secession Church and the Relief Church

- Classification: Protestant
- Orientation: Calvinist
- Polity: Presbyterian
- Origin: 1847
- Merger of: The Relief Church and the United Secession Church
- Defunct: merged with the Free Church of Scotland in 1900 to form the United Free Church of Scotland

The United Presbyterian Church (Scottish Gaelic: Eaglais Chlèireach Aonaichte) was a Scottish Presbyterian denomination. It was formed in 1847 by the union of the United Secession Church and the Relief Church, and in 1900 merged with the Free Church of Scotland to form the United Free Church of Scotland, which in turn united with the Church of Scotland in 1929. For most of its existence, the United Presbyterian Church was the third largest presbyterian church in Scotland, and stood on the liberal wing of Scots Presbyterianism. The church's name was often abbreviated to the initials UP.

== United Secession Church ==
The United Secession Church was founded in 1820 by the union of various churches which had previously seceded from the established Church of Scotland. The First Secession had been in 1732, and the resultant Associate Presbytery grew to include 45 congregations. A series of disputes, in 1747 over the burgesses oath, and in the late 18th century over the Westminster confession, led to further splits, but in 1820 two of the groups united to form the United Associate Synod of the Secession Church, also known as the United Secession Church.

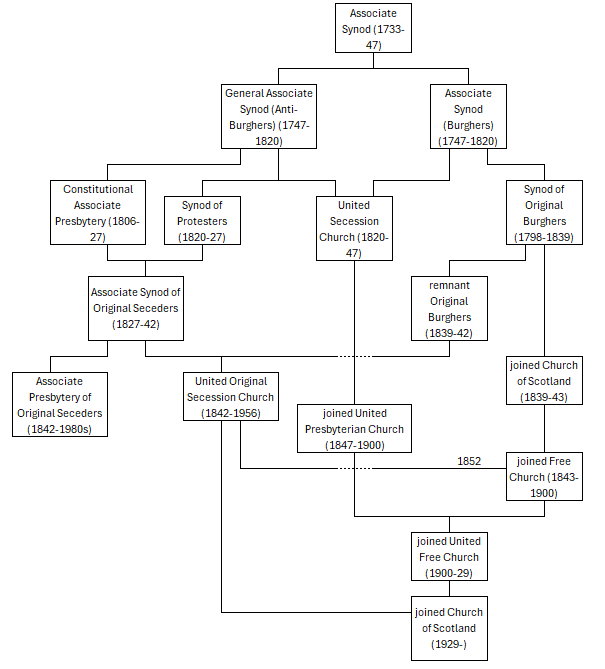
Secession church history

== The Relief Church ==
The Presbytery of Relief was constituted in 1761 by three ministers of the Church of Scotland, one of whom was Thomas Gillespie, who had been deposed by the assembly in 1752 for refusing to take part in the intrusion of unacceptable ministers. The number of congregations under its charge increased with considerable rapidity, and a Relief Synod was formed in 1773, which in 1847 had under its jurisdiction 136 congregations.

The Relief Church issued no distinctive testimonies, and a certain breadth of view was shown in the formal declaration of their terms of communion, first made in 1773, which allowed occasional communion with those of the episcopal and independent persuasions.

In 1794, the Relief Church adopted as its hymn book Patrick Hutchison's Sacred Songs and Hymns on Various Passages of Scripture, and it was Hutchison who established the first systematic definition of the Relief Church's beliefs.

A Relief theological hall was instituted in 1824.

== The union ==
In 1847, a union formed between all the congregations of the United Secession Church and 118 out of 136 of the Relief Churches, in what then became the United Presbyterian Church. It was the first presbyterian body to relax the stringency of subscription, the Church Synod passing a declaratory act on the subject in 1879. On such points as that of the six days' creation, it was made clear that freedom was allowed; but when David Macrae of Gourock claimed that it should also be allowed on the question of eternal punishment, he was at once declared to be no longer a minister of the church. He left behind him many who sympathized with his position, and in the remaining part of the 19th century the United Presbyterian Church came fully to share the forward movement of thought of the other Scottish churches.

Doctrinally, little distinguished the United Presbyterian Church and the Free Church of Scotland, and between 1863 and 1873 negotiations took place on a union, which however proved fruitless due to different views on the relationship between state and church. But in 1896, the United Presbyterian Church again made advances, which were promptly met, and on 31 October 1900 the United Free Church of Scotland came into existence.

Timeline showing the evolution of the churches of Scotland from 1560

The final moderator (1899/1900) of the UP was Very Rev. Alexander Mair (1834–1911).

== Church buildings ==
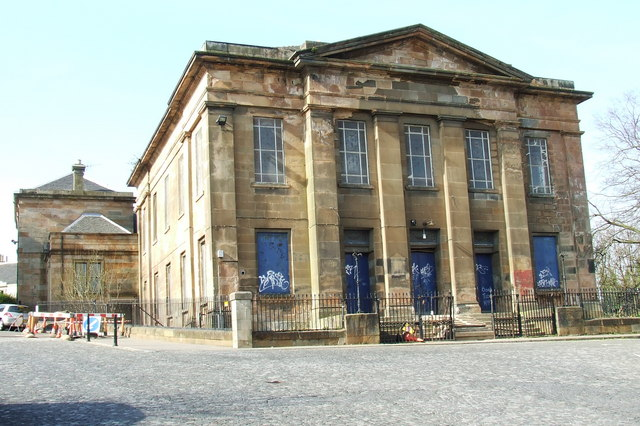
The former United Presbyterian church in Paisley.

The United Presbyterian Church constructed a number of notable buildings, the largest of which often used a neoclassical design with a portico. A particularly fine example is Wellington Church, near the University of Glasgow, which was built in 1883–84 by the architect Thomas Lennox Watson. This preference for neoclassical architecture contrasts strongly with the prevailing mid-Victorian taste for Gothic Revival in most of the other Scottish churches. Most U.P. churches were, however, far more modestly built than Wellington.

The famous architect Alexander "Greek" Thomson (1817–1875) designed three striking UP church buildings in Glasgow at Caledonia Road Church (1856), St Vincent Street Church (1859), and Queen's Park (1867). Of the three, only St Vincent Street survives intact, Caledonia Road Church being an empty shell and Queen's Park destroyed by World War II bombing.

Alexander Thomson was a member of the United Presbyterian Church. His architectural style was often eclectic; it cannot be described as truly neoclassical (he never managed to visit Greece), but he frequently used Egyptian and other Middle Eastern motifs. His interior designs and colour schemes for churches were strongly influenced by Biblical descriptions of King Solomon's Temple, for example the reference to pomegranates in 2 Chronicles 4:13 and the furnishings mentioned in 1 Kings 6:15-36.

== Theological professors ==
1. John Brown - Professor of Exegetical Theology - 1847-1858

2. William Lindsay - Professor of Sacred Languages and Criticism - 1847-1866

3. Neil M'Michael - Professor of History of Doctrines - 1847-1874

4. John Eadie - Professor of Hermeneutics and Evidences - 1847-1859, Professor of Biblical Literature - 1859-1876

5. James Harper - Professor of Systematic and Pastoral Theology - 1847-1876, Professor of Systematic Theology and Apologetics (jointly with John Cairns) 1876-1879.

6. John Ker - Pastoral Training (without professorial status) - 1876-1886

7. John Cairns - Professor of Apologetical Theology - 1867-1876 - Professor of Systematic Theology and Apologetics, (jointly with James Harper, 1876-1879) 1876-

8. James A. Paterson - Professor of Hebrew and Old Testament Literature and Exegesis - 1876-

9. David Duff - Professor of Church History - 1876-1890

10. Robert Johnstone - Professor of New Testament Literature and Exegesis - 1876-

== See also ==
- Ebenezer Erskine
- Religion in the United Kingdom
- Scottish United Presbyterian Mission

== Sources ==
- Anonymous History Of The Mission Of The Secession Church To Nova Scotia And Prince Edward Island: From Its Commencement In 1765... Nabu Press; November 5, 2011
- Mackelvie, William (1873). Annals and statistics of the United Presbyterian Church. Edinburgh : Oliphant and A. Elliot; Glasgow : D. Robertson.
- Small, Robert (1904a). History of the congregations of the United Presbyterian Church, from 1733 to 1900. Vol. 1. Edinburgh: David M. Small.
- Small, Robert (1904b). History of the congregations of the United Presbyterian Church, from 1733 to 1900. Vol. 2. Edinburgh: David M. Small.
