= Emelia Geddie =

Scottish Presbyterian child prophet (1665–1681)

- Born: 1665; Hilltown of Falkland, Fife, Scotland
- Died: 2 February 1681; Hilltown of Falkland, Fife, Scotland
- Occupation(s): Presbyterian child prophet and "exemplar of godliness"

Emelia Geddie (1665 – 2 February 1681) was a Scottish Presbyterian child prophet and "exemplar of godliness."

== Biography ==
Geddie was born in 1665 at Hilltown of Falkland, Fife, Scotland. Her parents were the staunch Presbyterians John Gedde (fl. 1647–1697) and Anne Wallace (fl. 1657–1691), daughter of an Ayr schoolmaster. Her father was clerk to the Marquess of Atholl, but lost his position after he was reported to the privy council of Scotland for attending field conventicles. He also refused to sign the Test Acts introduced in the reign of King James VII of Scotland.

As a child, Geddie was pious, knew large sections of the Bible by heart, chided sabbath-breaking servants, rebuked her social superiors for complying with episcopacy, composed her own grace before meals and had prophetic intimations. Her religiosity was interpreted by Presbyterians a sign of God speaking through her and she was considered an "exemplar of godliness."

Geddie was influenced by her schoolmistress Katherine Ross, herself a covenanter, who recorded many of Geddie's sayings. In 1675, Geddie learned to write at a private school in London. After returning to Scotland, Geddie became sought after as a spiritual counsellor, attended prayer meetings and conferred with covenanter ministers, including Donald Cargill. She was often asked her opinions on serious matters, for example the defeat of the Presbyterians at the Battle of Bothwell Bridge in 1679.

Geddie died of flux at Hilltown of Falkland on 2 February 1681, when she was aged sixteen.

== Legacy ==
Geddie's sayings were collected by the Presbyterian minister at Carnock, James Hog, and were posthumously published in 1717 in Edinburgh as Some Choice Sentences and Practices of Emilia Geddie, Daughter to John Geddie, in the Sheriffdom of Fife, from her Infancy, to her death on the 2d of February 1681, in the Sixteenth year of her age. As they were gathered from her parents and other persons. The book was priced at one penny. Hog described Geddie in discussion as: "so close to the respective Purposes, and so well instructed from the Word, as if she had been an aged and experienced Divine."

Hog's book of Geddie's life and sayings was published and republished over several editions. An 1805 version was recommended by George Whitefield. In 1821, a version of Hog's book, The Life of Emilia Geddie, was printed in an American first edition of 6'000 copies for the New England Tract Society.

In 1782, the Scottish minister and theologian John Brown featured Geddie's life and sayings in his work The Young Christian, or, The Pleasantness of Early Piety Exemplified, which was published in Glasgow.
