= Hugh Mackail =

Scottish Presbyterian minister (1640–1666)

- Mackail's execution

Personal details
- Born: various spellings: Hugh or Hew Mackail, McKail, M'Kail, M'Kell, McKel, MacKell, M'Kaill, Mackaile c. 1640
- Died: 22 December 1666 market-cross Edinburgh
- Denomination: Church of Scotland
- Education: University of Edinburgh

Hugh Mackail (various spellings) (c. 1640 – 22 December 1666), Scottish preacher and martyr. A supporter of the Scottish Reformation, he refused to follow the episcopal church of the king of England, and preached as a Covenanter; he was executed for treason in Edinburgh.

He was born about 1640 at Liberton, near Edinburgh. His father was Matthew Mackail who was minister at Bothwell before being deprived of his ministry by the government in 1662. At an early age he went to reside with an uncle, Hugh Mackail, one of the ministers of Edinburgh. He entered the University of Edinburgh, studying divinity, where he distinguished himself, graduating, as the records show, in 1658 under Thomas Crawford. Shortly afterward he became chaplain and tutor in the family of Sir James Stuart of Coltness and Goodtrees, then Lord Provost of Edinburgh. In 1661, being then in his twenty-first year, he was licensed by the Presbytery of Edinburgh and afterward preached several times with much success.

A sermon which he delivered in the High Church, Edinburgh, in September 1662, in which he declared that "the church of Scotland had been persecuted by an Ahab on the throne, a Haman in the state, and a Judas in the church," gave such offence that a party of horse was sent to apprehend him. He escaped, however, and, after lying concealed in his father's house in Bothwell for some time, retired into Holland, where he improved his time by studying for several years perhaps near Rotterdam. Then, returning to Scotland, he lived chiefly at his father's house, until in November 1666 he joined a rising of the covenanters. After nine days' marching, however, his weak health obliged him to leave the insurgents, and on his way back to Liberton he was arrested, carried to Edinburgh, and committed to the Tolbooth. He was several times brought before the council and tortured with the boot.

Finally, after trial, despite the efforts of his cousin, Matthew Mackail, an apothecary, who interceded with James Sharp, archbishop of St. Andrews, on his behalf, Hugh was hanged at the market-cross of Edinburgh on 22 December 1666, amid "such a lamentation," says Kirkton, "as was never known in Scotland before, not one dry cheek upon all the street, or in all the numberless windows in the market-place." According to MS. Jac. V. 7. 22, in the Advocates' Library, "immediately after the execution of the aforementioned four men there came a letter from the king, discharging the executing of more; but the Bishop of St. Andrews kept it up till Mr. Hew was executed," Mackail behaved with great fortitude on the scaffold, addressing the crowd with singular impressiveness.

He was buried in Greyfriars churchyard. Wodrow describes him as "universally beloved, singularly pious, and of very considerable learning."

== Early life ==
Hugh Mackail, a martyr of the covenant, was born about 1640. He studied, with a view to the church, at the University of Edinburgh, under the care of his uncle, one of the ministers of that city, and was afterwards, for some time, chaplain to Sir James Stuart of Coltness, then lord provost of Edinburgh. Around 1649 he is thought to have converted the young teacher Katherine Collace. In 1661, he was licensed to preach, being then in his twenty-first year.

On the 1 September 1662, when 400 presbyterian ministers were about to be driven from their charges for non-compliance with episcopacy, he delivered a discourse in the High Church of Edinburgh, from the Song of Solomon, Chapter 1, verse 7, in which, speaking of the many persecutions to which the cause of religion had been subjected in all ages, he said that "the church and people of God had been persecuted both by an Ahab on the throne, a Haman in the state, and a Judas in the church." In those troublous days, such an illustration was sure to find an application, whether the preacher meant it or not, parallel to the times. Accordingly, the Ahab on the throne was considered to be Charles II, and Middleton and Archbishop Sharp took the Haman and Judas to themselves. A few days thereafter a party of horse was sent to apprehend him, but he escaped, and went to his father's house in the parish of Liberton. Soon after, he took refuge in Holland, where he remained four years, during which time he studied.

== Return to Scotland, arrest and torture ==
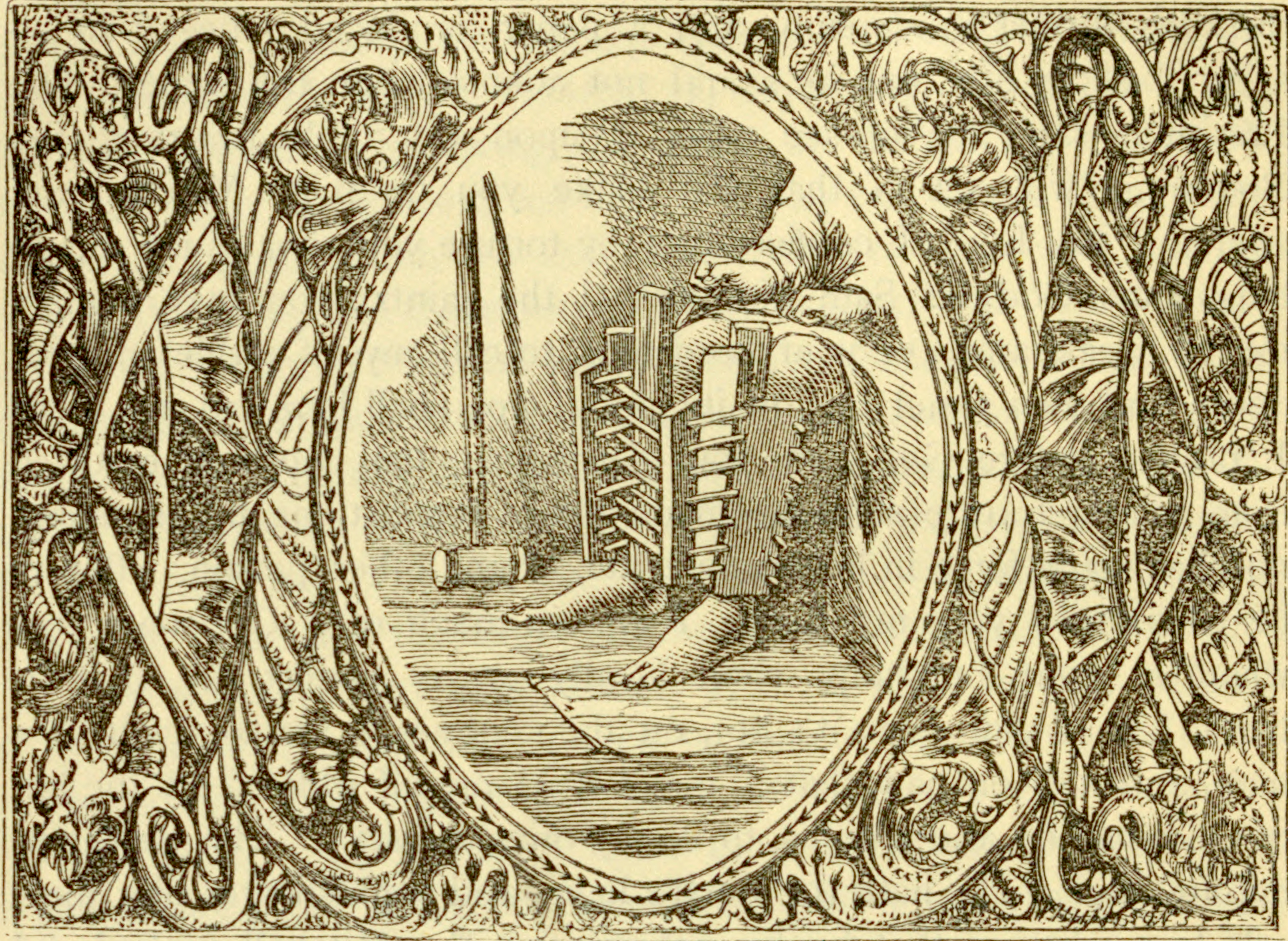
The Boots from Scots Worthies

In 1666 he returned to Scotland, and immediately joined the band of covenanters who rose in arms in the west, previous to the defeat at Rullion Green, and continued with them from the 18 to the 27 of November, when not being able to endure the fatigue of constant marching, he left them near Cramond Water. He was on his way to Liberton, when he was taken by an officer of dragoons, and some countrymen, as he passed through a place called Braid's Craigs. He had then a sword or rapier, which of itself was a circumstance of suspicion against him. He was conveyed to Edinburgh and searched for letters, but none being found, he was committed to the tolbooth. Next day, he was brought before the privy council for examination, and on the 4 December he was subjected to the torture of the boot, with the object of extracting information from him relative to a conspiracy, which the government affected to believe extensively existed; but he declared that he knew of none, and had nothing to confess. The strokes were repeated ten or eleven times, when he swooned away, and was carried back to prison. The torture and the prison conditions brought on a fever, and as he was ordered to prepare for trial, for having joined in the insurrection, although he had left the party the day previous to the battle of Pentland, he petitioned the council for a delay of a few days, when it was remitted to two physicians and two surgeons to inquire into his case. His cousin, Mr. Matthew M'Kail, an apothecary in Edinburgh, afterwards a doctor of medicine, applied to Archbishop Sharp, to interpose in his behalf, but the prelate only desired him to assure the prisoner that he would befriend him, if he would reveal the mystery of the plot against the government, and as he was not able to do so, he was put to the torture. Still the cousin was determined to persevere in his efforts to save his unfortunate relative, and even followed the archbishop to St. Andrews. A note to M'Crie's edition of Veitch's Life gives the details.

== Trial ==
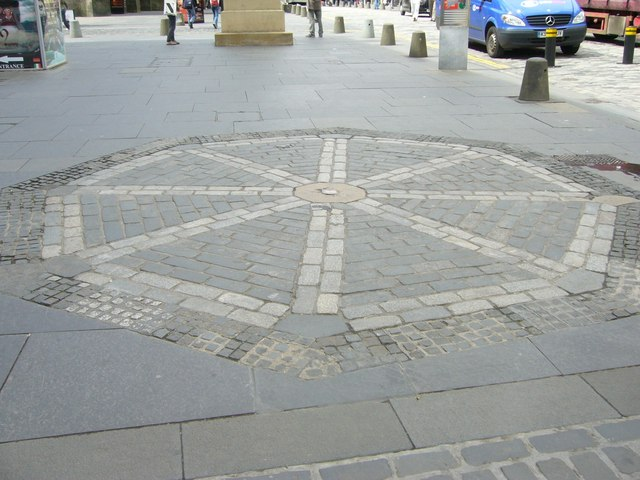
The location of the Cross between 1617 and 1756.

Next day, being 18 December, the prisoner was brought before the court of justiciary, with three others. When placed at the bar, Mackail addressed the court, and "spoke of the ties and engagements that were upon the land to God; and having commended the institution, dignity, and blessing of presbyterian government, he said that the last words of the national covenant had always great weight on his spirit. Whereupon the king's advocate interrupted him, and desired, he would forbear that discourse, since he was not called in question for his persuasion, but for the crime of rebellion." As a matter of course he was found guilty of high treason, and condemned to be hanged at the market cross of Edinburgh on 22 December, four days later.

== Hanging ==
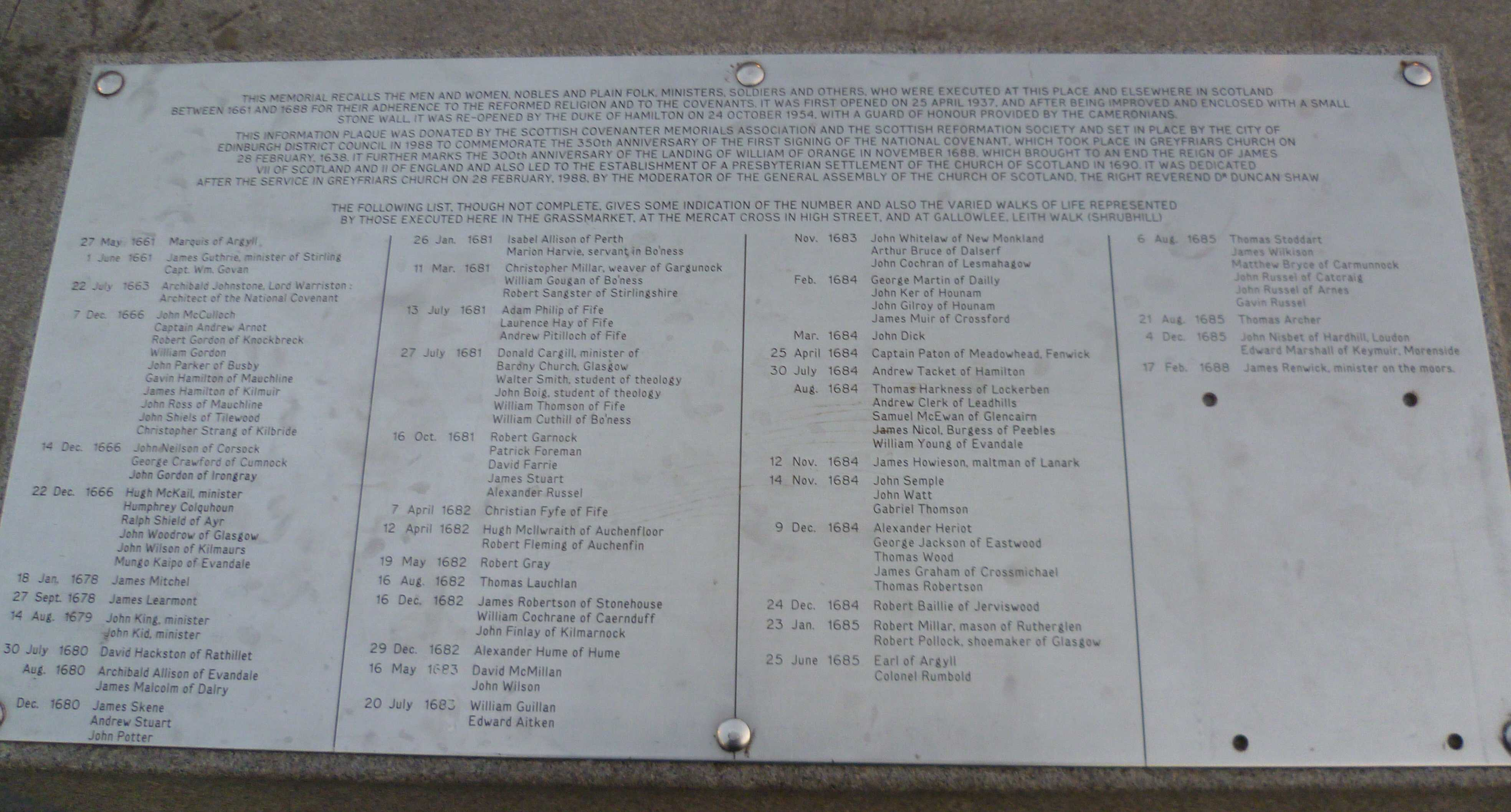
Plaque, Grassmarket

Previous to being hanged, he addressed the spectators at some length, imputing the persecution of the church to the prelates, and declaring his readiness to die for the cause of God, the covenants, and the work of reformation, which had been the glory of Scotland. Hugh Mackail, was only twenty-six years old at the time of his death. He was prepared for burial at the Magdalen Chapel. He was buried in Greyfriars Kirkyard "near the east dyke, a little above the stair, near the entry".

== Ephraim Macbriar ==
Sir Walter Scott's character Ephraim Macbriar in Old Mortality is supposed to be a distorted picture of Hugh Mackail.

== Bibliography ==
- Scots Worthies, i. 309
- Anderson's Scottish Nation, iii. 2-5
- Memoirs of William Veitch, pp. 35–8
