= Barbara Peebles =

- Died: 1670?
- Known for: Presbyterian visionary and prophet

Barbara Peebles was a Scottish Presbyterian, visionary and prophet known to have been active in the 1660s.

== Visions and prophesies ==
Peebles' visions began in 1660 during an illness when she expected to die. She described the power going from her body and a temporary loss of speech. On 20 July 1660, she prophesied martyrdoms and persecution, and God sanctioned to her the Presbyterian form of church government; she is thought to have been a member of a praying circle that was focussed around a radical Presbyterian minister. In December 1666, she wrote in a letter that she had seen Christ weep tears of blood because of the King, Charles II. In one of her visions, Peebles said she had visited heaven.

As a Presbyterian visionary, she was cautious to describe her visions within the context of theology appropriate to her creed. It has been noted that "Her visions fit the biblical role model of Hulda, the prophetess who served an Old Testament covenanted king": in this, she may have seen her role as eventually speaking personally to Charles, persuading him to take on the new Covenant.

== Writing ==
Peebles wrote an autobiography, dated 20 July 1660, titled The Exercise of a Private Christian, or Barbara Peebles' Trance. This was copied and circulated, probably amongst fellow Presbyterians, and three copies survive. This recording of her own visions, rather than the transcription being undertaken by a man, was more unusual for a woman visionary and may explain why Peebles used God as a defence for her move to manifest her visions to the ministry. Records of Peebles' visions are collected in the Wodrow MSS.

== Historical context ==
Peebles' work as a prophet may be part of a larger context of prophecy by women in her era's religious discussions and events. Scottish Presbyterians were persecuted during the Commonwealth rule and then following Charles II's Restoration in 1660. Yeoman notes that Peebles' July 1660 visions and prophesies were two months after the restoration to the throne of Charles, and that her December 1666 vision was very shortly after the defeat in battle at Rullion Green of the Presbyterians. In this sense, they act as a commentary on and explanation of crises.

== Birthdate, family life, and death ==
Peebles' birthdate and date of death are not known although she may be the Barbara Peebles who died in Edinburgh in 1670. Details in some of Peebles' writings show that she was married.
