= Thomas Boston =

Scottish Presbyterian church leader and theologian

Reverend Thomas Boston
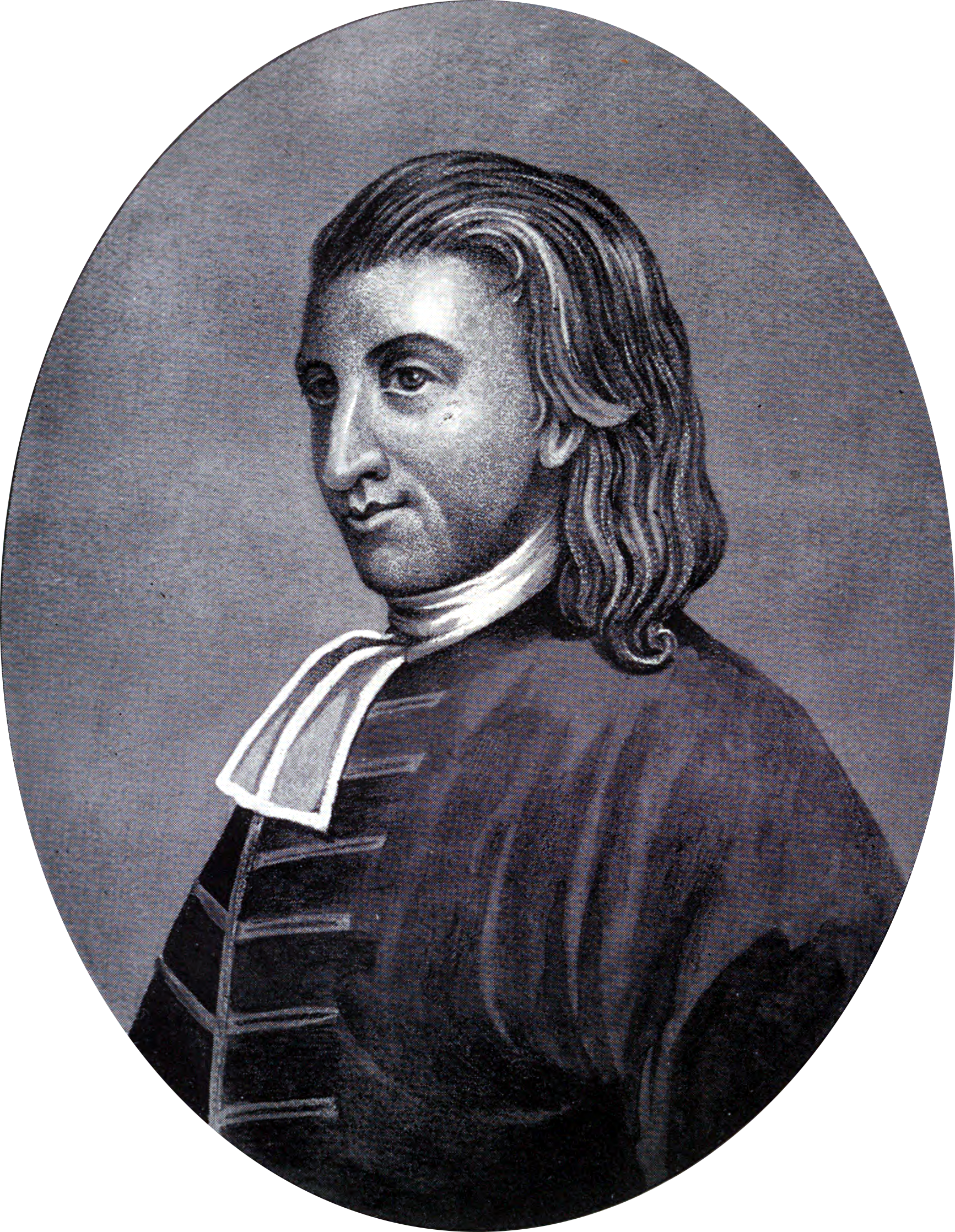
- from A general account of my life
- Born: 17 March 1676; Duns, Berwickshire
- Died: 20 May 1732 (aged 56); Ettrick, Scottish Borders
- Occupations: Schoolmaster, church leader, philosopher
- Notable work: Human Nature in Its Fourfold State
- Theological work
- Tradition or movement: Marrow Brethren
- Notable ideas: Free offer of the gospel, Assurance, Republication of the Covenant of Works

Thomas Boston (17 March 1676 – 20 May 1732) was a Scottish Presbyterian church leader, theologian and philosopher. Boston was successively schoolmaster at Glencairn, and minister of Simprin in Berwickshire, and Ettrick in Selkirkshire. In addition to his best-known work, Human Nature in Its Fourfold State, one of the religious classics of Scotland, he wrote an original little book, The Crook in the Lot, and a learned treatise on the Hebrew points. He also took a leading part in the Courts of the Church in what was known as the "Marrow Controversy," regarding the merits of an English work, The Marrow of Modern Divinity, which he defended against the attacks of the "Moderate" party in the Church. Boston, if unduly introspective, was a man of singular piety and amiability. His autobiography is an interesting record of Scottish life, full of sincerity and tenderness, and not devoid of humorous touches, intentional and otherwise.

== Life ==
He was born at Duns. His father, John Boston, and his mother, Alison Trotter, were both Covenanters. He was educated at Edinburgh, and licensed in 1697 by the presbytery of Chirnside. In 1699 he became minister of the small parish of Simprin, where there were only 90 examinable persons; previously, he was a schoolmaster in Glencairn. In 1704 he found, while visiting a member of his flock, a book brought into Scotland by a commonwealth soldier, the Marrow of Modern Divinity, by Edward Fisher, a compendium of the opinions of leading Reformation divines on the doctrine of grace and the offer of the Gospel, which set off the Marrow Controversy.

Its object was to demonstrate the unconditional freeness of the Gospel. It cleared away such conditions as repentance, or some degree of outward or inward reformation, and argued that where Christ is heartily received, full repentance and a new life follow. On Boston's recommendation, James Hog of Carnock reprinted The Marrow in 1718; and Boston also published an edition with notes of his own. The book, attacked from the standpoint of high Calvinism, became the standard of a far-reaching movement in Scottish Presbyterianism.

The Marrow men were marked by the zeal of their service and the effect of their preaching. As they remained Calvinists they could not preach a universal atonement; rather they were particular redemptionists.

In 1707 Boston was translated to Ettrick, Scotland. He was the only member of the assembly who entered a protest against the lightness of the sentence passed on John Simson, Professor of Divinity at Glasgow, who was accused of heterodox teaching on the Incarnation.

He was born in Duns on 17 March 1676, son of John Boston (who suffered imprisonment in the cause of nonconformity) and Alison Trotter. He was educated at the Grammar School of Duns and was later employed by Alexander Cockburn, notary. He graduated with an M.A. (Edinburgh, 9 July 1694), his whole expenses at college being £10, 14s. 7fd. sterling. He then became schoolmaster of Glencairn in 1695; res. 8 February 1696; was thereafter tutor to young Andrew Fletcher of Aberlady, and chaplain to his stepfather, Colonel James Bruce of Kennet; licen. by Presb. of Duns and Chirnside 15 June 1697; officiated in vacant parishes in the Presb. of Stirling in 1698; ord. to Simprin 21 September 1699; clerk of Synod in 1701; called by the Presb. jure devoluto 24 January 1706; adm. to Ettrick 1 May 1707, the day of the Union of Scotland and England; died 20 May 1732.

He and eleven others gave in a Representation and Petition to the General Assembly of 1721 against an Act passed in the previous year condemning The Marrow of Modern Divinity. The Assembly of 1722 directed that the ministers who had signed the Representation should be rebuked by the Moderator. That was done, and a protest prepared by Boston was not received, but was subsequently printed by the protesters. Boston's own writings, together with his devout life and exemplary pastoral labours, contributed greatly to the popularity of the doctrines contained in the Marrow. His communions were attended by crowds from all parts, and he was one of the most influential figures in the Church life of his time. His theology was essentially Calvinistic. A literalism dominated his interpretation of the Scriptures, and he regarded even the Hebrew accents as divinely inspired.

== Family life ==
He married on 17 July 1700, Katherine (died 4 March 1737), fifth daughter of Robert Brown of Barhill, Culross, a medical practitioner, and had children

- Katharine, born 24 May 1701, died in 1702
- John, chamberlain to the Duke of Buccleuch at Langholm, born 29 April 1702, died in 1757 [his son became an admiral of the British Navy; for an interesting notice of him, vide Memoir of Caroline Herschel]
- Robert, born 21 March 1704, died 26 January 1705
- Jane, born 1 November 1705 (married 2 December 1736, James Russell of Ashiestiel), died in 1765
- Ebenezer, born 23 April 1707, died 8 September 1707
- Ebenezer, born 4 August 1708, died 10 October 1708
- Thomas, born 9 February 1710, died 30 April 1712
- Alison, born 8 June 1711 (married James Anderson, farmer, Altrive), died in 1765
- Thomas, his successor in the parish
- Katharine, born 15 July 1715, died 12 March 1716.

== Works ==
Boston's autobiography is a record of Scottish life. His other books include Human Nature in Its Fourfold State, one of the religious classics of Scotland; The Crook in the Lot, a short book noted for its originality; and his Body of Divinity and Miscellanies. These works had a major influence over the Scottish peasantry. Among his works is a learned treatise on Hebrew points. His Memoirs were published in 1776 (ed. George D. Low, 1908). An edition of his works in 12 volumes appeared in 1849.

=== List of works ===
DNB list:

- 'Sermon' (Hos. ii. 19, preached 24 Aug. 1714), 1715, reprinted 1732.
- 'Reasons for refusing the Oath of Abjuration,' 1719.
- 'Human Nature in its Four-fold Estate,' &c. Edinburgh, 1720, 8vo (often reprinted; transl. into Welsh 1767; into Gaelic 1837, reprinted 1845; edition revised by Rev. Michael Boston, the author's grandson, Falkirk, 1784, 8vo; abridged, with, title 'Submission to the Righteousness of Christ,' Birmingham, 1809)
- 'Queries to the Friendly Adviser, to which is prefixed a Letter to a Friend, concerning the affair of the Marrow,' &c., 1722, 8vo.
- 'Notes to the Marrow of Modern Divinity,' 1726.
- 'The Mystery of Christ in the form of a Servant,' &c. (sacrament sermon, Phil. ii. 7), Edinburgh, 1727, 8vo.
- 'A View of the Covenant of Grace,' 1734, 8vo.
- 'Thomæ Boston, ecclesiæ Atricensis apud Scotos pastoris, Tractatus Stigmologicus, Hebræo-Biblicus. Quo Accentuum Hebræorum doctrina traditur, variusque eorum, in explananda S. Scripture, usus exponitur. Cum præfatione viri reverendi & clarissimi Davidis Millii,' Amstelædami, 1738, 4to (a handsome volume, with many copper-plates; dedicated by Boston's son, Thomas, to Sir Richard Ellys, bart.; Mill's preface is dated from Utrecht, 6 February 1738; he does not endorse Boston's view, that the Hebrew accents are of divine origin. Boston's work shows very thorough and wide scholarship; he was acquainted with French and Dutch, in addition to the tongues necessary for his purpose. He had prepared for the press 'An Essay on the first twenty-three chapters of the Book of Genesis; in a two-fold version of the original text,' with notes, theological and philological; in this work he showed the utility of his theory of the Hebrew accents, and made use of the elaborate system of punctuation which he had framed to represent them in English).
- 'Sermons and Discourses … never before printed,' Edin. 1753, 2 vols. 8vo.
- 'Explication of the First Part of the Assembly's Shorter Catechism,' 1755, 8vo.
- 'A Collection of Sermons,' Edin. 1772, 12mo.
- 'A View of the Covenant of Works, from the Sacred Records, &c., and several Sermons,' Edin. 1772, 12mo.
- 'The Distinguishing Characters of true Believers … to which is prefixed a soliloquy on the art of man-fishing,' Edin. 1773, 12mo.
- 'An Illustration of the Doctrines of the Christian Religion … upon the plan of the Assembly's Shorter Catechism,' &c. Edin. 1773, 3 vols. 8vo.
- 'Ten Fast Sermons,' 1773, 8vo; 'Worm Jacob threshing the Mountains' (sacrament sermon, Is. xli. 14, 15), Falkirk, 1775, 8vo.
- 'The Christian Life delineated,' Edin. 1775, 2 vols. 12mo.
- 'Sermons,' 1775, 3 vols. 8vo,
- 'A View of this and the other World' (eight sermons), Edin. 1775, 8vo.
- 'Sermons on the Nature of Church Communion,' Berwick, 1785, 12mo.
- 'A Memorial concerning personal and family Fasting and Humiliation,' Edin. 1849, 12mo. 3rd ed., pref, and app. by Alex. Moody Stuart, A.M.
- 'The Crook in the Lot,' Glasgow, 1863, 12mo (with biographical sketch).
- 'Whole Works,' edited by Rev. Samuel McMillin, with the 'Marrow of Modern Divinity illustrated,' 1854, 12 vols. 8vo (several of the above collections overlap; the famous sermon on the 'Crook in the Lot' has often been reprinted).
- The Crook in The Lot
- Human Nature in its fourfold state
- A view of the covenant of grace (reprinted by Focus Christian Ministries Trust, ISBN 1-870223-21-7)
- Hell (reprinted by Diggory Press, ISBN 978-1-84685-748-5)
- The Art of Man-Fishing (reprinted by Christian Focus Publications Ltd., ISBN 978-1-85792-106-9)
- Memoirs
- Body of Divinity
- Miscellanies

== Biography ==
- Life of the Rev Thomas Boston, Edinburgh: Wm Oliphant,1827
- Thomas Boston: His Life & Times, Andrew Thomson, 2004 reprint, Christian Focus Publications'
- Memoirs
- Acts of Ass., 1720, 1722
- Scots Mag., xviii.
- Brown's Gospel Truth
- Middleton's Biographia Evangelica, iv., 254
- Irving's Scot. Writers, ii.
- Jean L. Watson's The Pastor of Ettrick
- Dr Andrew Thomson's Thomas Boston
- Barnett's Makers of the Kirk
- Henderson's Religious Controversies of Scotland
- Morrison's Introduction
- Dict. Nat. Biog.
- A General Account of My Life, by Thomas Boston, A.M., Minister at Simprin, and at Ettrick (London, 1908), edited by George D. Low, M.A., has a lengthy bibliography of Boston's writings, and of works on the Marrow controversy

== In literature ==
- Boston is referenced in one of Robert Burns' poems ("Letter to James Tail of Glenconner", lines 19–22.):

For now I'm grown sae cursed douce,
I pray an' ponder butt the house;
My shins, my lane, I there sit roastin'
Perusing Bunyan, Brown, an' Boston.

- In Alice Munro's short story "No Advantages" (The View from Castle Rock, 2006), Boston is described briefly. Munro writes, "In his autobiography he speaks of his own recurring miseries, his dry spells, his sense of unworthiness and dullness even in the act of preaching the Gospel, or while praying in his study..." (pp. 14–15).
- Boston is also quoted by Reverend McBain in Munro's short story "A Wilderness Station" (1992).
