= James Wodrow =

James Wodrow (1637–1707) was a minister of the Church of Scotland.

== Life ==
He was born at Hill of Eaglesham on 2 January 1637 the fourth son of Robert Wodrow (1600-1672) and his wife Agnes Dunlop. His father was Chamberlain to the Earl of Eglinton.

James was educated at Eaglesham Parish School by John Tran who was later Professor of Philosophy at Glasgow University. James was then sent to Glasgow Grammar School and from there went to Glasgow University graduating MA in 1659.

He was licensed "privately" by nine Presbyterian ministers in Glasgow in February 1673 i.e. the process excluded church elders who were standardly involved in the choice of a minister. In November 1675, still lacking a patron, he became tutor to the family of the Duke of Hamilton.

In 1676 he was denounced by the Presbytery of Glasgow for failing to follow the citations of the Privy Council. He then disappears from records again until August 1688 when he was appointed preacher at the Markdaylay Meeting House in south Glasgow. Only in 1689 was he ordained as a minister, but this was to one of the city's most prestigious churches: the Outer High Kirk housed in Glasgow Cathedral. Four years later, in February 1692, he was Professor of Divinity at Glasgow University in place of Rev Prof James Wemyss DD. He remained in this post until death, but from 1705 was obliged to pay for an assistant.

He died on 25 September 1707.

== Family ==
In 1673 he married Margaret Hair (d. 1688), widow of Hugh Dunlop. Their children included:

- Rev Alexander Wodrow (1674-1706), minister of the Tron Kirk in Glasgow
- Rev Robert Wodrow (1679-1734) historian

In 1692 James Wodrow married Janet Luke eldest daughter of John Luke and had two further children of which only one, John (b. 25 May 1695), lived until adulthood and became a physician ("Life of James Wodrow, AM" by Robert Wodrow, AM (his son) pp121). The footnote listed here is incorrect and conflates information. Best to also look at "Memorials of the Faculty of Physicians and Surgeons of Glasgow 1599 - 1850" by Alexander Duncan, BA pp251

There is direct line from James Wodrow, via his son John, to President Thomas Woodrow Wilson, 28th President of the United States.
