= John Geddie =

John Geddie may refer to:

- John Geddie (secretary) (floruit 1575–1605), Scottish royal secretary and calligrapher
- John Geddie (journalist) (1848–1937), Scottish journalist and author of several books mainly on the subject of Edinburgh
- John Geddie (missionary) (1815–1872), Scots-Canadian missionary to the New Hebrides
