= Marrow of Modern Divinity =

Book written in 1645 by Edward Fisher

The Marrow of Modern Divinity was a book written in 1645 by Edward Fisher and later reprinted with the notes of Thomas Boston. The book ignited the Marrow controversy. The book is divided into three sections which are called "The Law of Works, The Law of Faith and The Law of Christ" is a dialogue with four characters, which are: an antinomian, a legalist, a minister of the gospel and a new Christian. Fisher attempts by using the dialogue of these characters to describe the gospel from errors. The book is centered around the law-gospel distinction.

In 1720, the General Assembly of the Church of Scotland passed the "Act concerning a Book, entitled, The Marrow of Modern Divinity," which concluded:

The General Assembly do hereby strictly prohibit and discharge all the ministers of this Church, either by preaching, writing, or printing, to recommend the said book, or, in discourse, to say any thing in favour of it; but, on the contrary, they are hereby enjoined and required to warn and exhort their people, in whose hands the said book is, or may come, not to read or use the same.

== See also ==
- Auchterarder Creed
