= James Hadow =

British theologian

James Hadow (1667–1747) was a Scottish minister who served as Principal of St Mary's College, St Andrews from 1707 till 1747.

== Life ==
He was born in Douglas, South Lanarkshire, Scotland on 13 August 1667. He died on 4 May 1747 at St Andrews, Fife, Scotland.

The Dictionary of National Biography suggests that Hadow was educated abroad, probably due to the persecution of the Covenanters. It is probable that he was the same James Hadow who published two Latin theses in Utrecht in 1685 and 1686. He was placed as "second charge" of Cupar in Fife in 1692 and on 30 October 1694 was ordained as minister of Cupar.

In 1699 he was made Professor of Divinity at St. Mary's College in the University of St. Andrews. Between 1707 and 1747 he was also Principal of the college.

The head of the University of St Andrews is the Rector, who was elected annually, and Hadow was elected Rector on 14 occasions between 1706 and 1747.

He died in St Andrews on 4 May 1747.

== Family ==
In 1697 he married Isabel Tullidelph (d.1758) daughter of William Tullidelph, Principal of St Leonard's College, St Andrews.

His son George Hadow became professor of Hebrew in St Mary's College, University of St Andrews.

His daughter Barbara Hadow married Rev Thomas Ayton minister of Kilconquhar.

Hadow had a brother, Thomas Hadow. He is believed to have received a commission in the Cameronians in 1694, to have taken part in the Battle of Dunkeld in 1689 and was probably killed at the Battle of Steenkerque in 1692.

In 1705 he married Margaret Forrester.

== Work ==
Hadow was involved in many public controversies in the church. In 1720, he took a leading part in the Marrow controversy which bore on the views contained in The Marrow of Modern Divinity, published in England by Edward Fisher in 1645. In 1720, Hadow presided over a sub-committee for preserving purity of doctrine. Six so-called antinomian paradoxes were extracted from the work, on the subject of the sins of a believer. On 20 May 1720, an act of assembly was passed condemning the book, and instructing ministers to warn their people not to read it. Some of the "Marrowmen" seceded, but the rest, after a time, were silently permitted to promulgate their views.

Hadow acted against John Simson, Professor of Divinity at Glasgow University, who, being accused of Socinian views, was suspended from his professorship in 1729.

The old weather vane of St. Mary's College at St. Andrews' University has the following initials: M IH 1728". These stand for "Magister James Hadow"

A portrait of Hadow hangs at St Mary's College, St Andrews' University. This portrait was returned to St Andrews' University by 1941 by Arthur Lovell Hadow and has since undergone restoration.

Although he had an official residence inside St Mary's College in the north-west corner of the courtyard, his family resided at 46 South Street, where the Hadow coat-of-arms sits over the door.

== Publications ==
- The Record of God and Duty of Faith (1719)
- The Antinomianism of the Marrow of Modern Divinity detected (1721)
- An Inquiry into Mr. Simson's Sentiments about the Trinity from his Papers in Process (1730)
- A Vindication of the Learned and Honourable Author of the History of the Apostles' Creed, from the false Sentiment which Mr. Simson has injuriously imputed to him (1731)
