= Robert Wodrow =

Scottish minister and Covenanter historian

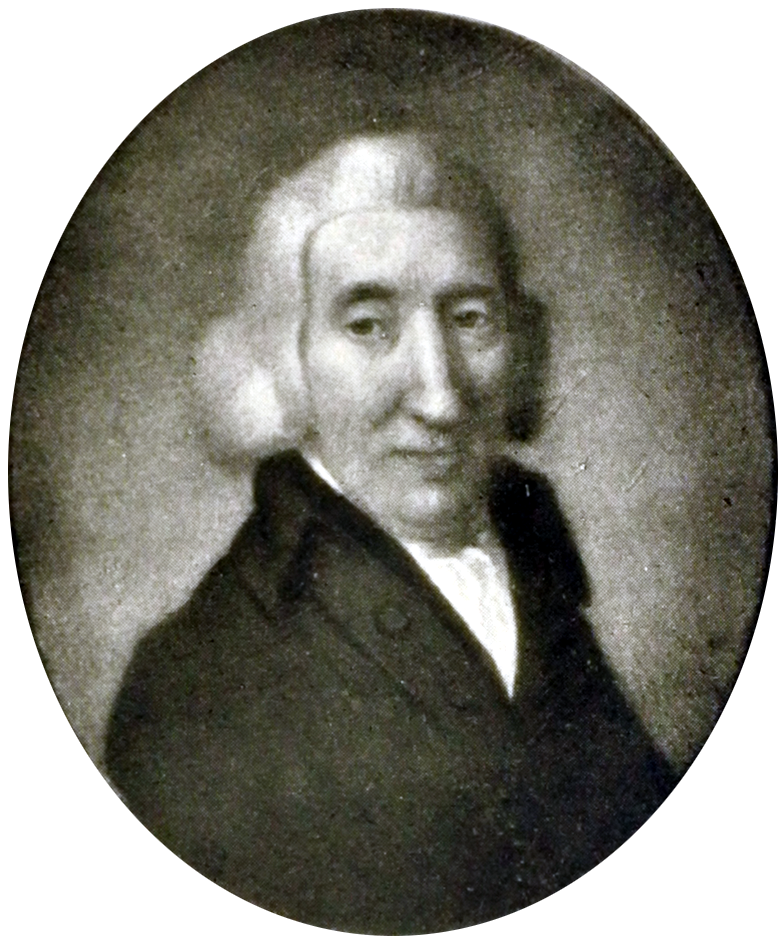
- portrait from Eastwood

Personal details
- Born: April (or September) 1679
- Died: 21 March 1734
- Denomination: Church of Scotland
- Occupation: minister

Robert Wodrow (1679 – 21 March 1734) was a Scottish minister and historian, known as a chronicler and defender of the Covenanters. Robert Wodrow was born at Glasgow, where his father, James Wodrow, was a professor of divinity. Robert was educated at the university and was librarian from 1697 to 1701. From 1703 till his death, he was parish minister at Eastwood, near Glasgow. He had sixteen children, his son Patrick being the "auld Wodrow" of Burns's poem Twa Herds.

== Biography ==
Robert Wodrow was the youngest son of James Wodrow, Professor of Divinity, at the University of Glasgow. He was born in the Trongate there, April (or September) 1679. At the very hour of his birth, soldiers under warrant of the Privy Council, were searching the house to seize his father, but the latter, having exchanged clothes with the physician's man-servant, succeeded in escaping. Wodrow entered the University of Glasgow in 1691, and graduated with an M.A. on 18 January 1697. He served as chaplain in the house of his kinsman, Sir John Maxwell of Pollok, and for several years he was librarian to the University of Glasgow. On 6 January 1703, he was licensed by the Presbytery of Paisley, and ordained to Eastwood on 28 October of that year. In 1707 he was one of a Committee of Presbyterians appointed to consult and act with the Commission in Edinburgh as to the best means of averting the evils with which the Union of the Kingdoms seemed to threaten the church and people of Scotland. On the accession of George I. in 1714, he was principal correspondent and adviser of the five ministers sent by the Assembly to London to plead the rights of the Church, and particularly to petition for the abolition of patronage. He assisted Principal Hadow in drawing up the Act of Assembly (1731) for the filling up of vacant parishes, the passing of which in the following year gave rise to the Associate Presbytery. He declined calls to Glasgow in 1712, to Stirling in 1717, and again in 1726. He died on 21 March 1734. An enthusiastic collector of information on the history and personal ministry of the Church, he left behind him a vast accumulation of interesting and illuminative MSS. many of which were printed by the Wodrow Society (1841–50), the Maitland and other Clubs. The Wodrow MSS. are preserved in the Advocates Library, and the Library of the University of Glasgow. The papers include records of the visions of the 17th century Presbyterian prophet Barbara Peebles.

== Family ==
He married November 1708, Margaret (died 27 January 1758), widow of Ebenezer Veitch, minister of Ayr, and daughter of Patrick Warner of Ardeer, minister of Irvine, and had issue:

- Janet, born 1710, buried 5 April 1773 ["Her days and nights were devoted to the poor, to whom she gave her personal but unostentatious attendance"];
- Robert, his successor in Eastwood
- Patrick, minister of Tarbolton;
- James (1730–1810), minister of Stevenston, Ayrshire. He left a valuable collection of letters exchanged over six decades with his friend Samuel Kenrick, who settled as a banker in Bewdley, Worcestershire. Their correspondence is being published in four volumes by Oxford University Press (2020–).
- Alexander, settled in America, had an estate there, and died about the end of the first American War;
- Mary, died unmarried;
- Margaret (married Matthew Biggar, minister of Kirkoswald);
- Marion, died unmarried;
- Martha
- six others died early.

== Works ==
Wodrow's major work, The History of the Sufferings of the Church of Scotland from the Restoration to the Revolution, was published in two volumes in 1721–1722 (new ed. with a life of Wodrow by Robert Burns, DD, 1807–1808). This recorded and denounced the persecution of the Covenanters after the restoration of the monarchy in 1660, including what he called "The Killing Times" . He was one of the first historians to use "publick records, original papers, and manuscripts of that time" and included many first hand accounts of this period in the history of the Church of Scotland, producing a martyrology that the church would turn to again at times of suffering. The work was approved by the General Assembly of the Church of Scotland and dedicated to George I, who recognised its semi-official character by, on 26 April 1725, authorising the payment out of the exchequer of 100 guineas to Wodrow.

As an apprentice, the soon-to-be prominent London bookseller Andrew Millar sent Wodrow book price-lists. As a friend of Millar's father, Wodrow may have helped to apprentice Millar to James McEuen, who was also his friend.

Wodrow also wrote a Life (1828) of his father. He left two other works in manuscript: Memoirs of Reformers and Ministers of the Church of Scotland, and Analecta: or Materials for a History of Remarkable Providences, mostly relating to Scotch Ministers and Christians. Of the former, two volumes were published by the Maitland Club in 1834–1845 and one volume by the New Spalding Club in 1890; the latter was published in four volumes by the Maitland Club in 1842–1843.

Wodrow left a great mass of correspondence, three volumes of which, edited by Thomas McCrie, appeared in 1842–1843. The Wodrow Society, founded in Edinburgh to perpetuate his memory, was in existence from 1841 to 1847, several works being published under its auspices.

== Bibliography ==
- The history of the sufferings of the church of Scotland from the restoration to the revolution, with an original memoir of the author, extracts from his correspondence, and preliminary dissertation and notes, in four volumes. Vol. 1. Glasgow: Blackie Fullerton & Co. 1828.
- The history of the sufferings of the church of Scotland from the restoration to the revolution, with an original memoir of the author, extracts from his correspondence, and preliminary dissertation and notes, in four volumes. Vol. 2. Glasgow: Blackie Fullerton & Co. 1830.
- The history of the sufferings of the church of Scotland from the restoration to the revolution, with an original memoir of the author, extracts from his correspondence, and preliminary dissertation and notes, in four volumes. Vol. 3. Glasgow: Blackie Fullerton & Co. 1829.
- The history of the sufferings of the church of Scotland from the restoration to the revolution, with an original memoir of the author, extracts from his correspondence, and preliminary dissertation and notes, in four volumes. Vol. 4. Glasgow: Blackie Fullerton & Co. 1835.
- Life of James Wodrow: Professor of Divinity in the University of Glasgow from 1692 to 1707. Edinburgh: William Blackwood. 1828.
- Collections Upon the Lives of the Reformers and Most Eminent Ministers of the Church of Scotland. Vol. 1. Glasgow: Maitland Club. 1834.
- Collections Upon the Lives of the Reformers and Most Eminent Ministers of the Church of Scotland. Vol. 2. Glasgow: Maitland Club. 1845.
- Analecta: Or Materials for a History of Remarkable Providences Mostly relating to Scotch Ministers and Christians. Vol. 1. Glasgow: Maitland Club. 1842.
- Analecta: Or Materials for a History of Remarkable Providences Mostly relating to Scotch Ministers and Christians. Vol. 2. Glasgow: Maitland Club. 1842.
- Analecta: Or Materials for a History of Remarkable Providences Mostly relating to Scotch Ministers and Christians. Vol. 3. Glasgow: Maitland Club. 1842.
- Analecta: Or Materials for a History of Remarkable Providences Mostly relating to Scotch Ministers and Christians. Vol. 4. Glasgow: Maitland Club. 1843.
- M'Crie, Thomas, ed. (1842). The Correspondence of the Rev. Robert Wodrow. Vol. 1. Edinburgh: The Wodrow Society.
- M'Crie, Thomas, ed. (1842). The correspondence of the Rev. Robert Wodrow. Vol. 2. Edinburgh: The Wodrow Society.
- M'Crie, Thomas, ed. (1843). The correspondence of the Rev. Robert Wodrow. Vol. 3. Edinburgh: The Wodrow Society.
