= John Bonar (minister) =

Church of Scotland minister

John Bonar (1721–1761) was a Church of Scotland minister.

== Life ==
John Bonar was born at Clackmannan on 4 November 1721; his father, also called Rev John Bonar (1696–1752), was then tutor at Kennet, and his mother Jean Smith was a daughter of William Smith of Alloa. His father was ordained minister of the united parishes of Fetlar and North Yell, in Shetland, in 1729, and young John was then sent to his grandfather's manse at Torphichen, Linlithgowshire. There he received a parish school education, and then went to the University of Edinburgh, where he graduated MA on 27 April 1742.

Bonar was licensed as a minister of the Church of Scotland on 5 June 1745, and ordained 22 August 1746 as the minister of the parish of Cockpen, near Dalkeith. In 1756 he received a presentation to the church of Jedburgh, from William Kerr, 4th Marquess of Lothian. He was unable to take it up, however, in the face of strong local opposition, from supporters of Thomas Boston; Boston was minister at Oxnam, just outside Jedburgh, and had the support of the Town Council. The Marquess's objection to the evangelical Boston was personal, rather than theological. and in the end John Douglas was nominated. Bonar was called to the second or collegiate church of Perth and settled there 29 July 1756.

Bonar died at Perth 21 December 1761, aged 39, from what his son James called 'an inflammatory fever'.

== Works ==
Bonar was known as a persuasive preacher on the old evangelical lines. In 1750 he printed anonymously Observations on the Conduct and Character of Judas Iscariot (reprinted in 1822); and in 1752 a prominent sermon on the Nature and Necessity of Religious Education, which was preached before the Society in Scotland for Propagating Christian Knowledge.

In 1755 Bonar published anonymously An Analysis of the moral and religious Sentiments contained in the writings of Sopho (i.e. Lord Kames) and David Hume, Esq., addressed to the General Assembly of the Church of Scotland, a work that has sometimes been wrongly attributed to Rev. George Anderson. It was replied to angrily in Observations upon the Analysis, but never answered.

In 1760 Bonar preached on Nature and Tendency of the Ecclesiastical Constitution in Scotland before the synod of Perth and Stirling. It was published, and reprinted in the Scots Preacher. He left unfinished The Example of Tyre, a Warning to Britain.

== Family ==
In November 1746, while at Cockpen, Bonar married Christian Currier, daughter of Andrew Currier, writer to the signet of Edinburgh. She died 22 November 1771. Their ten children included his namesake John Bonar, James Bonar, and Archibald Bonar. Archibald, who was minister of Cramond, had a son John Bonar (1799-1863) who was minister of Larbert Free Church.

Through James he was grandfather to Horatius Bonar and Andrew Bonar.

== Notes ==
=== Sources ===
- Scott, Hew (1923). Fasti ecclesiae scoticanae; the succession of ministers in the Church of Scotland from the reformation. Vol. 4. Edinburgh: Oliver and Boyd. p. 235.

Attribution

This article incorporates text from a publication now in the public domain: Stephen, Leslie, ed. (1886). "Bonar, John (1722-1761)". Dictionary of National Biography. Vol. 5. London: Smith, Elder & Co.
