= James Baine =

British minister

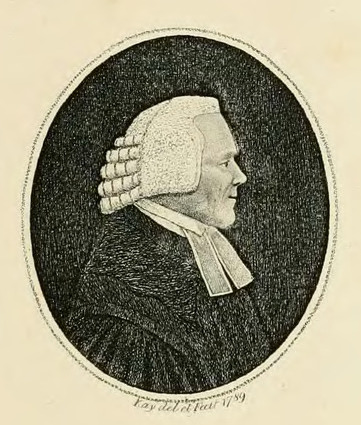
- portrait by John Kay
- Born: 1710; Bonhill
- Died: 17 January 1790
- Education: University of Glasgow

James Baine (1710 – 17 January 1790) was one of the ministers of the secession from the Church of Scotland which took the name of the Relief Church.

== Life ==
Baine was the son of the parish minister of Bonhill, Dunbartonshire, and born in the manse there in 1710. His elementary education was received at the parish school. He afterwards proceeded to the university of Glasgow. He had a brilliant career there and graduated M.A. Having been licensed as a preacher of the gospel, he was presented by the Duke of Montrose to the church of Killearn, the parish adjoining his father's. In 1756 he was translated to the high church of Paisley, and in 1757 had the celebrated Dr. John Witherspoon for a colleague.

Baine supported evangelical doctrine, as opposed to what came to be known as moderatism. In 1745 he was promoting revival in the west of Scotland. In the General Assembly and Presbytery, and from his pulpit, he defended the church's spiritual freedom against "ecclesiastical tyranny". When the General Assembly of the Church of Scotland in 1752 deposed Thomas Gillespie of Carnock, Baine pleaded for him. In the end he joined Gillespie, the founder of the Relief Church, resigning his living of Paisley on 10 February 1766.

Called before the General Assembly, Baine made a statement, vindicating both himself and Gillespie. He foresaw the issue, viz. that he was declared to be no longer a member of the church of Scotland. He published, on his deposition, 'Memoirs of Modern Church Reformation, or the History of the General Assembly, 1766, with a Brief Account and Vindication of the Presbytery of Relief.' This rare book takes the form of letters to a ministerial friend. His sketches of the 'moderates' are in the vein made famous later by Witherspoon. On 13 Feb. 1766, he was inducted into the ministry of the first Relief congregation erected in Edinburgh — in College Street. He was soon surrounded by a vast and devoted body of adherents. College Street church remains one of the largest and most important of the now United Presbyterian churches. Prior to his deposition and induction – the latter of which was conducted by Thomas Gillespie, of Carnock and Dunfermline — a tradition runs that he and his people worshipped in Old Greyfriars under the venerable Dr. John Erskine, and sat down together at the sacrament of the Lord's Supper there.

Baine had remarkable popular gifts, and even at Killearn his musically modulated voice had earned for him the name of the 'Swan of the West.' His sermons were eloquent and convincing. He was plain-spoken in denunciation of the vices of the day. He came into collision with Foote in 1770 by preaching and publishing a sermon entitled 'The Theatre Licentious and Perverted.' Foote's memorable ridicule of the great evangelist, George Whitfield, stung him. John Kay, the caricaturist portrait-taker, introduced him into his gallery. In 1777 he published a volume of sermons of fairly representative character, though, as is frequently the case, it is very evident that they needed his eye and voice to interpret them. He married the only daughter of Dr. Michael Potter, professor of divinity in Glasgow University, and son of Michael Potter, one of the martyrs of the Bass Rock. By her he had a large family, and representatives remain till now of varied distinction. He died on 17 January 1790, aged eighty.
