= Relief Church =

1761 Scottish Presbyterian denomination

- Classification: Protestantism
- Theology: Calvinism
- Polity: Presbyterian
- Founder: Thomas Gillespie
- Origin: 1761; Colinsburgh, Fife
- Separated from: Church of Scotland
- Defunct: merged with the United Secession Church in 1847 to form United Presbyterian Church of Scotland

The Relief Church (or Presbytery of Relief) was a Scottish Presbyterian denomination founded in 1761. In 1847 it united with the United Secession Church to form the United Presbyterian Church of Scotland. In relation to the history of the Church of Scotland it is known as the Second Secession, relating to the First Secession of 1733.

== History ==
The church was founded by Thomas Gillespie, a former minister of the Church of Scotland. He had been deposed by the General Assembly in 1752 after his role in the Inverkeithing Case, where he refused to participate in inducting a minister to the Inverkeithing parish since the parishioners opposed the appointment. Gillespie was joined by Thomas Boston of Oxnam and Thomas Colier of Westmoreland. They held the first meeting of the Presbytery of Relief at Colinsburgh in Fife in 1761. The name was chosen to mean relief from the patronage that was common in the Church of Scotland at the time.

The Relief body was liberal, welcoming independents, Episcopalians and other devout men to join them. In 1766, the distinguished minister James Baine resigned from his presbytery of Paisley and joined the Relief Church. In his letter of resignation Baine asserted that his faith and belief in his former creed was unchanged, but he was resigning due to abuses of church power.

Timeline showing the evolution of the churches of Scotland from 1560

The number of congregations grew rapidly, and a Relief Synod was formed in 1773, which in 1847 had under its jurisdiction 136 congregations. The Relief Church issued no distinctive testimonies, and a certain breadth of view was shown in the formal declaration of their terms of communion, first made in 1773, which allowed occasional communion with those of the Episcopal and Independent persuasion.

In 1794, the Relief Church adopted as its hymn-book Patrick Hutchison's Sacred Songs and Hymns on Various Passages of Scripture, and it was Hutchison who established the first systematic definition of the Relief Church's beliefs.

A Relief theological hall was instituted in 1824. In 1847, a union was formed between all the congregations of the United Secession Church and 118 out of 136 of the Relief Churches, in what became the United Presbyterian Church.

== Churches ==
Church	Lifetime	Relief	Notes
Aberdeen: Belmont Street	1779–1953 (174 yrs)	1778–1791	Rejoined Church of Scotland as Belmont Street chapel of ease 1791.
Aberdeen: Shiprow	1780–1840 (60 yrs)	1780–1807	Split from Belmont Street. Left Relief 1807, closed c. 1840.
Aberdeen: St Paul's	1802	1802–1847	UPC 1847, UFC 1900, CoS 1929.
Airdrie: South Bridge Street	1833	1841–1847	Split from Newarthill. USC, joined Relief 1841. UPC 1847, UFC 1900, CoS 1929.
Annan	1833–1847 (14 yrs)	1833–1847	Merged with Annan Burgher Church in 1847.
Arbroath: St Paul's	1835–1908 (73 yrs)	1835–1847	UPC 1847, UFC 1900. Absorbed into High Street UFC 1908.
Auchtermuchty: West	1762–1873 (111 yrs)	1762–1847	UPC 1847. United with East to form Auchtermuchty South UPC 1873.
Balfron	1793–1880 (87 yrs)	1793–1847	UPC 1847. United with Holm of Balfron to form Balfron and Holm UPC 1880.
Banff	1772–1886 (114 yrs)	1772–1808	Left Relief 1808 for Congregationalists. Dissolved.
Bathgate: West	1812–2023 (211 yrs)	1812–1847	UPC 1847, St John's UFC 1900, CoS 1929. U/w High to form Bathgate PC 2023.
Bonhill: North	1831	1831–1847	UPC 1847, UFC 1900, CoS 1929.
Brechin: Bank Street	1830–1914 (84 yrs)	1830–1847	UPC 1847, UFC 1900. United with City Road 1914 to form St Ninian's UFC.
Burnhead or Penpont	1799–1911 (112 yrs)	1799–1847	UPC 1847, UFC 1900. United with Penpont West to form Scaurbridge & Burnhead.
Castle Douglas (I)	1800–1817 (17 yrs)	1800–1817	Dissolved.
Castle Douglas: Trinity	1836–1923 (87 yrs)	1836–1847	UPC 1847, UFC 1900. United with Queen St & St George's to form Castle Douglas.
Ceres: East	1795–1885 (90 yrs)	1795–1847	Split from Ceres Antiburgher Church. UPC 1847. United with Ceres West UPC 1885.
Coatbridge: Dunbeth	1837	1837–1847	Began as preaching station 1836. UPC 1847, UFC 1900, CoS 1929.
Coldingham	1793–1940 (147 yrs)	1793–1805	Became Burgher 1805. USC, UPC, UFC, Col. St Andrew's PC 1929. U/w Priory 1940.
Cupar: Westport/Boston	1770–1918 (148 yrs)	1770–1847	UPC 1847, UFC 1900. Dissolved.
Cupar: Provost Wynd	1828–1848 (20 yrs)	1828–1848	Split from Cupar Westport. Minister and majority joined CoS (not UPC) 1848.
Dalkeith: King's Park	1765–1912 (147 yrs)	1765–1847	UPC 1847, UFC 1900. United with St John's to form St John's & King's Park UFC.
Dumbarton: Bridgend	1792	1792–1847	UPC 1847, UFC 1900, CoS 1929.
Dundee: Chapelshade	1789	1789–1791	Rejoined Church of Scotland as Chapelshade chapel of ease 1791.
Dundee: West Port	1792–1810 (18 yrs)	1792–1799	Left to become Independents 1799. United with Dundee Congreg. Church 1810.
Dundee: New Inn Entry	1799–1818 (19 yrs)	1799–1818	Dissolved.
Dundee: Seagate	1811–1821 (10 yrs)	1811–1821	Split from New Inn Entry. Dissolved.
Dundee: Dudhope Road	1821–1909 (88 yrs)	1821–1847	UPC 1847, UFC 1900. Dissolved.
Dundee: James' Church	1837	1837–1847	Split f. Dudhope Rd. UPC '47, UFC '00. Named Clepington 1906. St James' PC 1929.
Dumfries: Townhead	1787	1787–1847	UPC 1847, UFC 1900, CoS 1929.
Dunfermline: Gillespie	1761–1847 (86 yrs)	1761–1847	United with Maygate USC 1847 to form Gillespie and Maygate UPC.
Duns: South	1762–1976 (214 yrs)	1762–1847	UPC 1847. Abs. West 1895. UFC, CoS 1929. U/w Old & Boston to form Duns 1976.
Dunscore: Renwick	1814–1918 (104 yrs)	1814–1847	UPC 1847, UFC 1900. United with East to form Dunscore UFC 1918.
Edinburgh: College Street	1765–1910 (145 yrs)	1765–1847	UPC 1847, UFC 1900. U/w Cowgate and Pleasance to form Union UFC 1910.
Edinburgh: St James Place	1796–1933 (137 yrs)	1796–1847	UPC 1847, UFC 1900, CoS 1929. U/w Barony to form Barony & St James' Place.
Edinburgh: Roxburgh Place	1800–1856 (56 yrs)	1800–1821	Became independent 1821, joined CoS 1833/34. Dissolved?
Edinburgh: Viewforth	1818–1967 (149 yrs)	1818–1847	UPC 1847. Bruntsfield UFC 1900. CoS 1929. U/w Barclay to form Barclay Bruntsfield.
Ed.: Roxburgh Terrace	1824–1842 (18 yrs)	1824–1842	United with Arthur Street 1842.
Edinburgh: Arthur Street	1825–1842 (17 yrs)	1825–1842	United with Roxburgh Terrace 1842.
Ed. Arth. St & Roxb. Terr.	1842–1953 (111 yrs)	1842–1847	UPC 1847, Arthur Street UFC 1900, Pleasance 1919. CoS 1929. U/w Charteris Mem.
Edinburgh: Stockbridge	1825–1828 (3 yrs)	1825–1828	Dissolved.
Errol, Perthshire	1796–1855	1796–1855	Refused to unite with antiburgher church in 1849; wound up 1855.
Falkirk: West	1767–1990 (223 yrs)	1767–1847	UPC 1847, UFC 1900, CoS 1929. U/w St Andrew's to form St Andrew's West 1990.
Ford	1782–1949 (167 yrs)	1782–1815	Left for Burgher Church 1815. USC, UPC, UFC, CoS. U/w Cranstoun & Crichton.
Glasgow: Kelvingrove	1766–1908 (142 yrs)	1766–1847	Named at first Dovehill. UPC 1847, UFC 1900. U/w College to form C. & K.
Glasgow: Anderston	1769	1769–1847	UPC 1847, UFC 1900. Anderston Old PC 1929.
Glasgow: East Campbell St	1792–1926 (134 yrs)	1792–1847	UPC 1847, UFC 1900. U/w Sydney Place to form Syd. Pl. & E Campbell St 1926.
Glasgow: John Street	1798	1798–1847	Split from Dovehill. UPC 1847, UFC 1900, CoS 1929.
Glasgow: Hutchesontown	1799–1926 (127 yrs)	1799–1847	Split from Dovehill. UPC 1847, UFC 1900. U/w Caledonia Road to form H&CR 1926.
Glasgow: Greenhead	1805	1805–1847	UPC 1847, UFC 1900. Greenhead East PC 1929.
Glasgow: Tollcross	1806	1806–1847	UPC 1847, Main St UFC 1900, Tollc. Central UFC 1921.
Glasgow: Calton	1820	1820–1847	UPC 1847, UFC 1900, Calton Relief PC 1929.
Glasgow: Blackfriars Street	1830s–1841 (10 yrs)	1836–1841	Independent church, joined Relief 1836. Dissolved.
Glasgow: Gillespie	1844	1844–1847	Split from Calton. UPC 1847, UFC 1900, CoS 1929.
Haddington	1791–1800 (9 yrs)	1791–1800	Dissolved.
Hightae	1797–1807 (10 yrs)	1797–1807	Dissolved.
Kettle	1780	1780–1847	UPC 1847, Kingskettle UFC 1900, Kettle West PC 1929.
Kilmaronock	1772	1772–1847	UPC 1847, UFC 1900, Gartocharn PC 1929.
Kilsyth	1768	1768–1847	UPC 1847, Kilsyth Anderson UFC 1900, CoS 1929.
Kirriemuir (I)	1792–1899 (7 yrs)	1792–1899	Dissolved.
Kirriemuir: Bank Street	1829–1914 (85 yrs)	1829–1847	UPC 1847, UFC 1900. United with West to form Kirriemuir First UFC 1914.
Langholm: South	1800–1925 (125 yrs)	1800–1847	UPC 1847, UFC 1900. United with North to form Langholm Erskine UFC 1925.
Leith: Junction Road	1822–1975 (153 yrs)	1822–1847	UPC 1847, UFC 1900, CoS 1929. U/w St Thomas to form St Thomas Junction Road.
Mainsriddell	1789–1893 (104 yrs)	1789–1821	Left Relief 1821 for United Secession. UPC 1847. Dissolved.
Musselburgh: Millhill	1783–1960 (177 yrs)	1783–1847	UPC 1847, UFC 1900, CoS 1929. U/w Bridge Street to form St Andrew's PC 1960.
Newburgh	1841	1841–1847	Split from Newburgh Secession Church. Left for Ev. Union 1872, Cong. Union 1899.
Newlands	1790–1910 (120 yrs)	1790–1847	UPC 1847, UFC 1900. Absorbed into West Linton UFC 1910.
Newton Stewart	1792–1924 (132 yrs)	1792–1847	UPC 1847. Newton Stewart York Road UFC 1900. U/w Trinity to form St John's 1924.
Old Kilpatrick: Bankside	1793–1908 (115 yrs)	1793–1847	UPC 1847, UFC 1900. Absorbed into Bowling UFC 1908.
Partick: Newton Place	1823	1823–1847	Disjoined from Gl. Anderston. UPC 1847, UFC 1900, CoS 1929.
Peebles: West	1827–1918 (91 yrs)	1827–1847	UPC 1847, UFC 1900. Absorbed into Peebles St Andrew's UFC 1918.
Port William	1832–1907 (75 yrs)	1832–1847	UPC 1847, Port William Main Street UFC 1900. U/w High to form Port William 1907.
Portobello	1834–1843 (9 yrs)	1834–1843	Dissolved.
Stranraer: Bridge Street	1817–1868 (51 yrs)	1817–1847	UPC 1847. United with Bellevilla to form Stranraer West UPC 1868.
Strathkinnes	1800–1816 (16 yrs)	1800–1816	Dissolved.
Wamphray	1776–1871 (95 yrs)	1776–1847	UPC 1847. Reduced to a preaching station 1871.
Waterbeck	1790	1790–1847	UPC 1847, UFC 1900
Wigtown	1835–1843 (8 yrs)	1835–1843	Dissolved.

== Sources ==
- McCrie, C. G. (1893). The Free Church of Scotland : her ancestry, her claims, and her conflicts. Edinburgh: T. & T. Clark. pp. 60-62.
- Morren, Nathaniel (1840). Annals of the General Assembly of the Church of Scotland ... from the origin of the Relief in 1752 to the rejection of the overture on schism in 1766. John Johnstone.
- Rankin, James (1879). A handbook of the Church of Scotland. W. Blackwood. p. 57.
- Small, Robert (1904a). History of the congregations of the United Presbyterian Church, from 1733 to 1900. Vol. 1. Edinburgh: David M. Small.
- Small, Robert (1904b). History of the congregations of the United Presbyterian Church, from 1733 to 1900. Vol. 2. Edinburgh: David M. Small.
- Thomson, Andrew; Struthers, Gavin (1858). Historical sketch of the origin of the Secession Church and the History of the rise of the Relief Church. Edinburgh and London: A. Fullerton and Co.
