= Marrow Controversy =

1718–1720s Scottish theology dispute

The Marrow Controversy was a Scottish ecclesiastical dispute occasioned by the republication in 1718 of The Marrow of Modern Divinity (originally published in two parts in London in 1645 and 1649 by "E. F.", generally believed to be a pseudonym for Edward Fisher, a lay theologian of the seventeenth century). The work consists of religious dialogues which discuss the doctrine of the atonement and aim to guide the reader safely between Antinomianism and Neonomianism. The dispute involved two parties, being the Marrow Brethren and the General Assembly.

== History ==
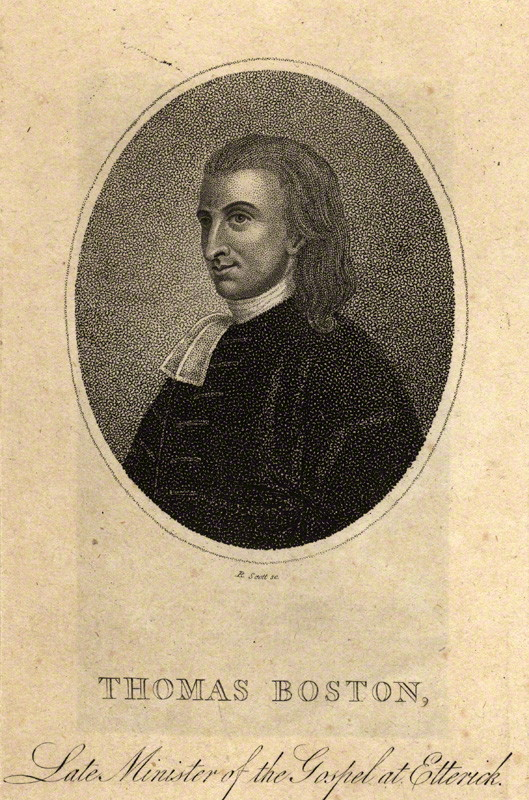
Thomas Boston

In 1700, while making a pastoral visit in the small country parish of Simprin, in the course of his work as a Church of Scotland minister, Thomas Boston borrowed a copy of The Marrow of Modern Divinity. He greatly appreciated the book and while a member of the 1717 General Assembly, commended it to a fellow minister. As a consequence of this conversation, in 1718 arrangements were made to have the Marrow reprinted, with a preface by James Hog of Carnock.

Based on the book, the Presbytery in Auchterarder issued a declaration, the Auchterarder Creed, which said it was unorthodox to say a person must repent of their sins to be justified.

This Auchterarder Creed was condemned by the General Assembly of the Church of Scotland in 1717, saying that one could only be saved after a person had gotten rid of their sins through repentance.

James Hadow, Professor of Divinity and Principal of St. Mary's College in the University of St Andrews, took the lead in opposing The Marrow, assailing it in his opening sermon at the Synod of Fife in April 1719. This was published shortly thereafter as The Record of God and Duty of Faith Therein required. An interchange of pamphlets with Hog ensued, with Hadow accusing the Marrow of the Antinomian heresy and Hog asserting that Hadow was misrepresenting the Marrow.

== Committee for Purity of Doctrine report ==
At the May 1719 General Assembly, an existing "Committee for Purity of Doctrine" was instructed to "enquire into the publishing and spreading of Books and Pamphlets", tending to the spread of doctrines "inconsistent with our Confession of Faith" and to call such authors to account. The committee's report, submitted in May 1720, strongly condemned the book as Antinomian. The Assembly overwhelmingly approved this report, prohibited all ministers of the Church of Scotland from recommending The Marrow in any way, and instructed them to warn their people against reading it. This had the effect of advertising a previously obscure book to people throughout Scotland and many proceeded to buy a copy and to read it carefully.

== Representation and Petition ==
At the Assembly in 1721 twelve men, including Boston, Hog and Ralph and Ebenezer Erskine, submitted a "Representation and Petition", arguing that in condemning The Marrow the Assembly had condemned propositions which were scriptural, and other expressions which were plainly taught both by many orthodox divines and in the doctrinal standards of the Church of Scotland. They also argued that the report had misrepresented the book's teaching, taking various expressions out of context. Their petition was rejected. In the Assembly of 1722 The Marrow's condemnation was reaffirmed and the twelve Representers were rebuked.

== Associate Presbytery ==
Subsequently, every effort was made by the men who had opposed The Marrow to prevent ministers holding Marrow doctrines from obtaining more influential pastoral charges, but no effective disciplinary action was taken against them. The ecclesiastical controversy thus gradually drew to an end, but theological disagreement continued. In the 1730s, though over a different issue, that of patronage, some of the proponents of Marrow theology left the Church of Scotland to form the Associate Presbytery, with the distinctive doctrines of The Marrow forming the theological basis for the new church.

In 1726 a new edition of The Marrow was published, with a preface and extensive annotations by Thomas Boston, defending and expounding the Marrow's teaching as Scriptural. In this form The Marrow has been frequently reprinted over the last nearly 300 years and has been widely influential.

== Viewpoints held by the Marrow Brethren ==
The Marrow Brethren, though rejecting universal atonement, held to common grace and that in some way God desires the salvation of all. They attacked "High Calvinism", and sought to clear the gospel out of any other conditions other than faith. The Marrow Brethren denied that actions such as repentance, with either inward or outward reformation, are necessary to receive salvation, but saw them as naturally flowing from receiving Christ.

The Marrow Brethren taught a form of the republication of the covenant of works. while maintaining the Mosaic Covenant was an administration of the Covenant of Grace. The Marrow had a high emphasis on the possibility of assurance, seeing the work of Christ as the foundation of the believer's assurance, while the general Assembly emphasized the human element in having assurance. The Marrow Men maintained a belief in the Scottish covenants even renewing them after the Secession.
