= Edward Fisher (theologian) =

English Christian writer, d. 1655

Edward Fisher (fl. 1627–1655) was an English theological writer.

Fisher is usually identified with "E.F.". the author of The Marrow of Modern Divinity (1645), a work which influentially stated the doctrine of unconditional grace, and was at the centre of the later Marrow Controversy. While this attribution of the book to Fisher is commonly accepted, it is contested by Alexander Gordon in the Dictionary of National Biography who considers it unlikely on internal evidence.

== Life ==
Fisher was the eldest son of Sir Edward Fisher, knight, of Mickleton, Gloucestershire. In 1627 he entered as a gentleman commoner at Brasenose College, Oxford, and graduated B.A. on 10 April 1630. He was noted for his knowledge of ecclesiastical history and classical languages. He was a royalist, and an upholder of the festivals of the church against the Puritans. He based the obligation of the Lord's day purely on ecclesiastical authority, declining to consider it Sabbath.

He succeeded to his father's estate in 1654, but finding it much encumbered he sold it in 1656 to Richard Graves. Getting into debt he retired to Carmarthen and taught a school, but his creditors found him, and he left for Ireland. Here he died, at what date is not known. His body was brought to London for burial. He was married, but his wife died before he did.

== Works by Fisher and E. F. ==
The publications uncontroversially identified as his are:

- 'The Scriptures Harmony ... by E. F., Esq.,' &c., 1643.
- 'An Appeale to thy Conscience,' &c., without place, 'printed in the 19th yeare of our gracious lord King Charles,' &c. (anonymous).
- 'The Feast of Feasts, or the Celebration of the Sacred Nativity,' &c., Oxf. 1644, (anonymous, identified as Fisher's by the Bodleian Catalogue).
- 'A Christian Caveat to the old and new Sabbatarians, or a Vindication of our Gospel Festivals . . . By a Lover of Truth; a Defender of Christian Liberty; and an hearty Desirer of Peace, internall, externall, eternall to all men,' &c., 1649 (i.e. 1650 N.S.); 4th edit. 1652, 'By Edward Fisher, Esq.,' has appended 'An Answer to Sixteen Queries touching the . . . observation of Christmass, propounded by Joseph Hemming of Uttoxeter' (reprinted Somers Tracts, 1748, vol. iv.); 5th edit. 1653; another edit. 1655, has appended 'Questions preparatory to the more Christian Administration of the Lord's Supper ... by E. F., Esq.' The Caveat, which reckons Christmas Day and Good Friday as of equal authority with the Lord's day, was attacked by John Collinges and Giles Collier. Parts of the 'Caveat' were reprinted by the Seventh Day Baptists of America, in 'Tracts on the Sabbath,' New York, 1853.

Thomas Tanner, in his 1721 edition of Anthony Wood's Athenae Oxonienses, identified Edward Fisher with E. F., the author of the Marrow of Modern Divinity; and the identification has been accepted by Philip Bliss, John Hill Burton, and others. It is doubted by George Grub. The author of the Marrow has been described as 'an illiterate barber,' but nothing seems known of him except that in his dedication to John Warner, the lord mayor, he speaks of himself as a 'poore inhabitant' of London. The following publications, all cast into the form of dialogue, and bearing the imprimatur of puritan licensers, are ascribed to the same hand:

- The Marrow of Modern Divinity . . by E. F., &c., 1645; 4th edit. 1646, has recommendatory letters by Jeremiah Burroughes, William Strong, Joshua Sprigge, and Samuel Prittie.
- 'A Touchstone for a Communicant ... by E. F.,' c., 1647, (Joseph Caryl's imprimatur).
- 'The Marrow of Modern Divinity: the Second Part ... by E. F.,' &c., 1649.
- 'London's Gate to the Lord's Table,' &c., 1647; the title-page is anonymous, but the signature 'E. F.' appears at the end of the dedication to Judge Henry Rolle of the pleas, and Margaret his wife.
- 'Faith in Five Fundamentall Principles . . . by E. F., a Seeker of the Truth,' &c., 1650.
