= James Hog =

James Hog (1658?–14 May 1734) was a Scottish Presbyterian minister at Carnock, known for his role in the Marrow Controversy within the Church of Scotland.

== Life ==
He was the son of Thomas Hog, minister of Larbert, Stirlingshire (d. 1680?). After graduating with an MA from the University of Edinburgh in 1677 he studied theology in Holland, was licensed to preach by the presbytery of Edinburgh, and ordained minister of Dalserf parish, in the presbytery of Hamilton, 20 January 1691.

Hog declined on principle to take the oath of allegiance in 1693. Against his own desire he was in 1695 elected a member of the General Assembly of the Church of Scotland, but declined to take the required oaths. The Lord High Commissioner then objected to his taking his seat, and Hog under pressure retired from the Assembly.

In bad health Hog resigned his charge on 12 November 1696, but in August 1699 he was installed in the parish of Carnock, Fife, and held the post till his death, on 14 May 1734.

Hog had arranged for the memoirs of the Covenanter Katherine Ross to be published and this work appeared in 1735.

== The Marrow Men ==
Hog belonged to the stricter section of the Church of Scotland, who cherished the Covenanter traditions, upheld popular rights, and took their stand against the more tolerant methods of thought and discipline that had come into the church. He originated the "Marrow" controversy by the republication in 1718, with a preface, of the Marrow of Modern Divinity. The book was denounced by an act of the assembly in 1720, whereupon Hog and 11 other ministers, who became known as the "Marrow Men", presented a protest. The bitter controversy which followed was an indirect cause of the First Secession of 1733. He was eulogised by Ralph Erskine.

== Works ==
Besides prefaces to other religious treatises, Hog was the author of a large number of theological pamphlets.

- Remarks concerning the Spirit's Operation, and the difference betwixt the Law and the Gospel (Edinburgh, 1701) — issued also as Notes about the Spirit's Operations for discovering from the Word their Nature and Evidence (Edinburgh, 1709)
- A Casuistical Essay upon the Lord's Prayer, to which is subjoined A Letter to a Friend (Edinburgh, 1705)
- A Letter to a Friend, containing diverse Remarks concerning the Sacrament of the Lord's Supper (Edinburgh, 1706)
- Some Select Notes towards detecting a correct mixture of the Covenant of Works and of Grace (Edinburgh, 1706–18)
- The Covenants of Redemption and Grace displayed (Edinburgh, 1707)
- Otia Christiana, or Christian Recreations (Edinburgh, 1708; Aberdeen, 1776) [in the First Edition the author's signature appears in error at the end of the Preface as " John Hog "]
- Some Remarks about Submission to the Sovereign disposure of the God of the Spirits of all Flesh (Edinburgh, 1709)
- Notes about Saving Illumination (n.d., also reprinted at Aberdeen, 1778)
- A Letter to a Gentleman, in which the Unlawfulness of imposing Forms of Prayer, and other Acts of Worship, is plainly Demonstrated (Edinburgh, 1710) [answered by Robert Calder in An Answer to Mr James Hog (Edinburgh, 1710)]
- A Letter to a Person exercised to Godliness about our Natural Enmity (Edinburgh, 1714)
- An Abstract of Sundry Discourses on Job XXXV I., 8, 9, 10 (Edinburgh, 1714; Aberdeen, 1778)
- Abstract of two private Discourses on Mark LX., 23 (Edinburgh, 1715)
- Remarks concerning the Rooting, Growth, and Ripeness of a Work of Grace in the Soul (Edinburgh, 1715)
- An Essay to vindicate some Scripture Truths [against Professor Simson] (Edinburgh, 1716)
- A Letter to a Gentleman detecting the gangrene of some Errors vented at this Time (Edinburgh, 1716)
- Abstract of Discourses on Psalm XLI., 4 (Edinburgh, 1716)
- Letter to a private Christian on Gospel Holiness (Edinburgh, n.d.)
- Three Missives written to a Minister of the Gospel, in answer to one from him [an anti-Separatist tract (Edinburgh, 1717, the first of those missives was reprinted at Edinburgh in 1893)
- The Right of Church Members to choose their own Overseers (Edinburgh, 1717)
- The Marrow of Modern Divinity [by Edward Fisher], edited with Preface (Edinburgh, 1718)
- A Vindication of the Doctrine of Grace from the Charge of Antinomianism (Edinburgh, 1718)
- Some Proposals for Peace and Harmony (Edinburgh, 1718)
- Some Missives addressed to a Gentleman which contain the Author's aim at detecting and refuting the Decision . . of our Time [twelve letters] (Edinburgh, 1718)
- A Letter concerning the True State of the Question between the Non-Jurant and Jurant Ministers of the Church of Scotland (Edinburgh, 1718)
- An Explication of Passages excepted against in the Marrow of Modern Divinity (Edinburgh, 1719)
- A Conference between Epaphroditus and Epaphras (Edinburgh, 1719)
- Remarks upon the Review of A Conference, etc. (Edinburgh, 1719)
- Letter to a Gentleman, containing a detection of Errors in a Print entitled "The Snake in the Grass" (Edinburgh, 1720) [in Answer to "The Snake in the Grass," or Remarks upon The Marrow of Modern Divinity (Edinburgh, 1719)]
- The Scope and Substance of the Marrow of Modern Divinity (Edinburgh, 1721)
- Reasons of Masters James Hog and James Bathgate . . . for their not Observing the Day of Thanksgiving (n.p., 1724)
- Answer to Campbell's Discourse proving that the Apostles were no Enthusiasts (Edinburgh)
- On Covenanting (Edinburgh, 1727)
- Preface to Halyburton's Natural Religion insufficient to Man's Happiness (Edinburgh, 1714), and to Memoirs or Spiritual Exercises of Mistress Ross (Edinburgh, 1735). The Controversie concerning the Marrow . . . Considered in Several Familiar Dialogues, I., II. (Edinburgh, 1721–2)
- Queries agreed unto by the Commission of the General Assembly (1721) and put to those Ministers . . . together with the Answers given (n.p., 1722)
- Memoirs of the Public Life of Mr James Hog and of the Ecclesiastical Proceedings of his Time previous to his Settlement at Carnock, written by himself as a Testamentary Memorial (1798).

== Family ==
He married, and had issue —

- Alison (married William Hunter, minister of Lilliesleaf)
- Janet (married Daniel Hunter, minister of Carnock).

== Bibliography ==
- Reg. Bur. (Edin.)
- Boston's Mem.
- Wodrow's Corresp., i. 23–6, 105–8, ii. 3, 191, 508, iii. 7
- Edin. Chris. Inst., 1831–2, p. 694
- Brown's Gospel Truth
- Fraser's Ralph Erskine
- Fraser's The Christian, the Student, and Pastor, Exemplified (Edinburgh, 1781)
- Erskine's Fife Bibliog., 171-4
- Henderson's Religious Controversies of Scotland, 20–43;

== Sources ==
- Scott, Hew (1925). Fasti ecclesiae scoticanae; the succession of ministers in the Church of Scotland from the reformation. Vol. 5. Edinburgh: Oliver and Boyd. pp. 9-10.

Attribution

This article incorporates text from a publication now in the public domain: Lee, Sidney, ed. (1891). "Hog, James". Dictionary of National Biography. Vol. 27. London: Smith, Elder & Co.
