= James Bonar (philanthropist) =

Scottish lawyer and philanthropist

- Born: 1801
- Died: 1867 (aged 65–66)
- Occupations: lawyer and philanthropist
- Known for: his involvement in the Disruption of 1843

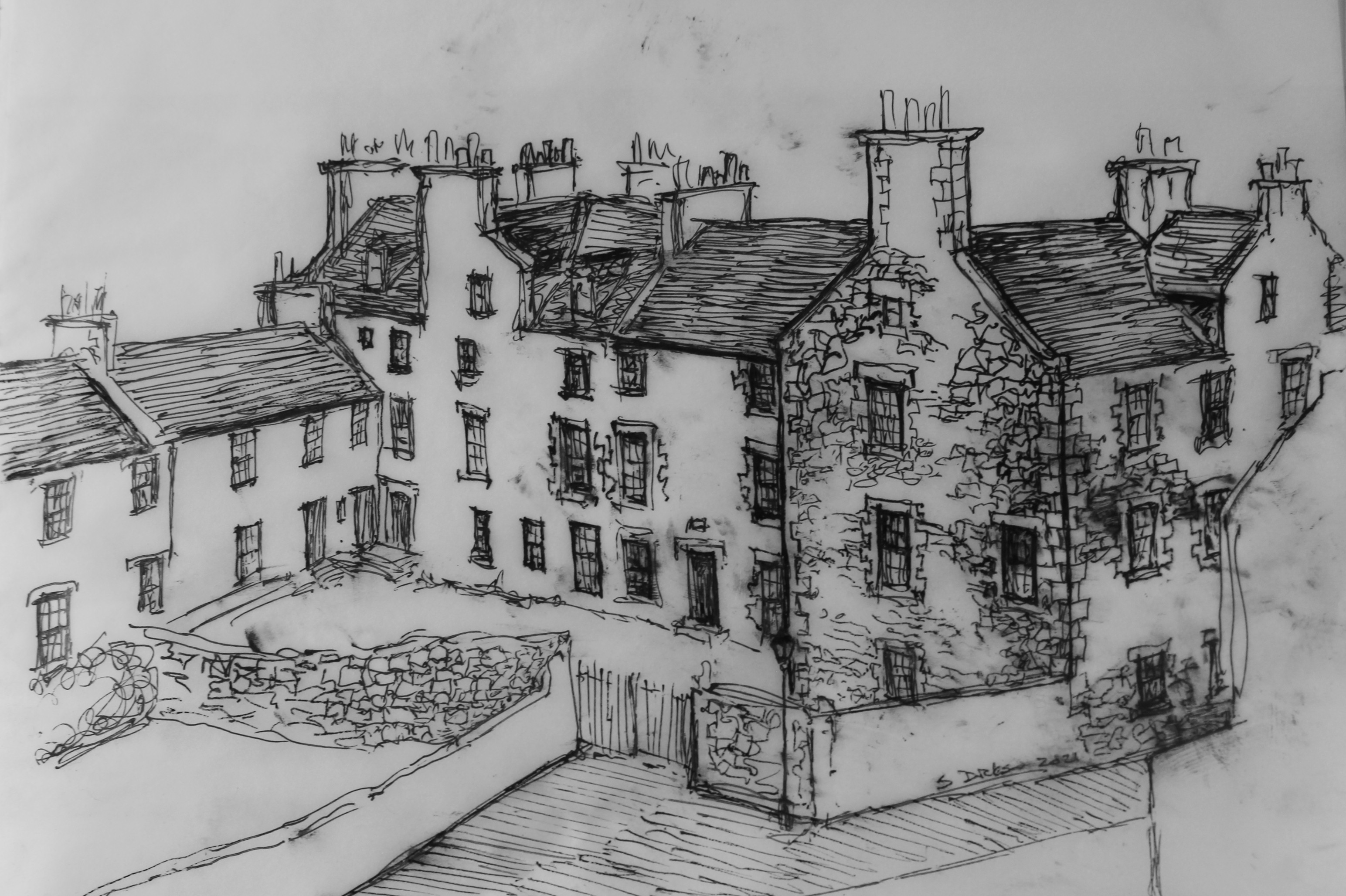
Paterson's Court, Broughton, Edinburgh c. 1850

James Bonar WS (1801–1867) was a Scottish lawyer and philanthropist who was involved in the Disruption of 1843 serving as Secretary to the Senetus of New College of the Free Church of Scotland and was involved in several organisations in Edinburgh.

== Life ==
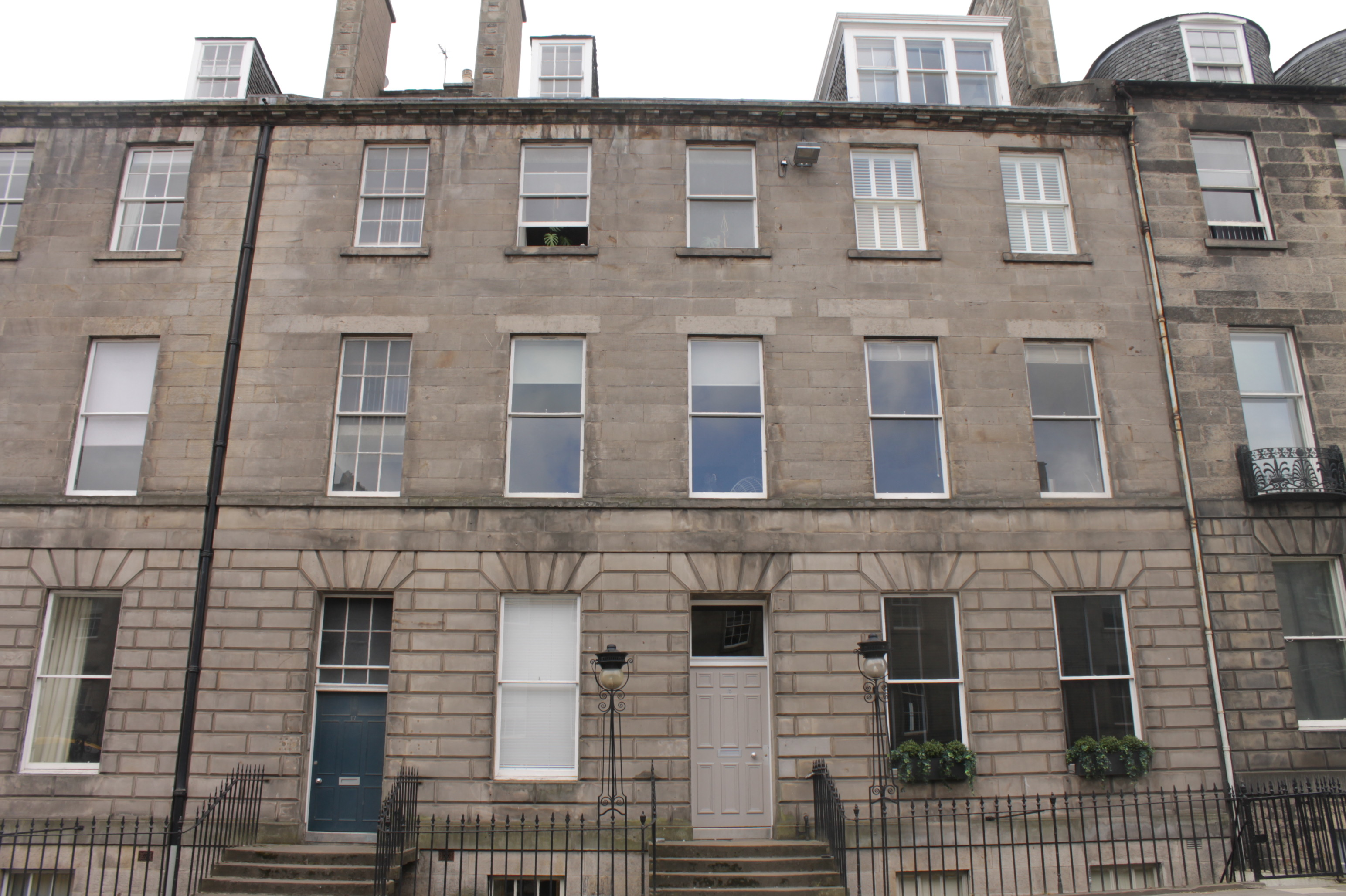
15 York Place, Edinburgh (left)

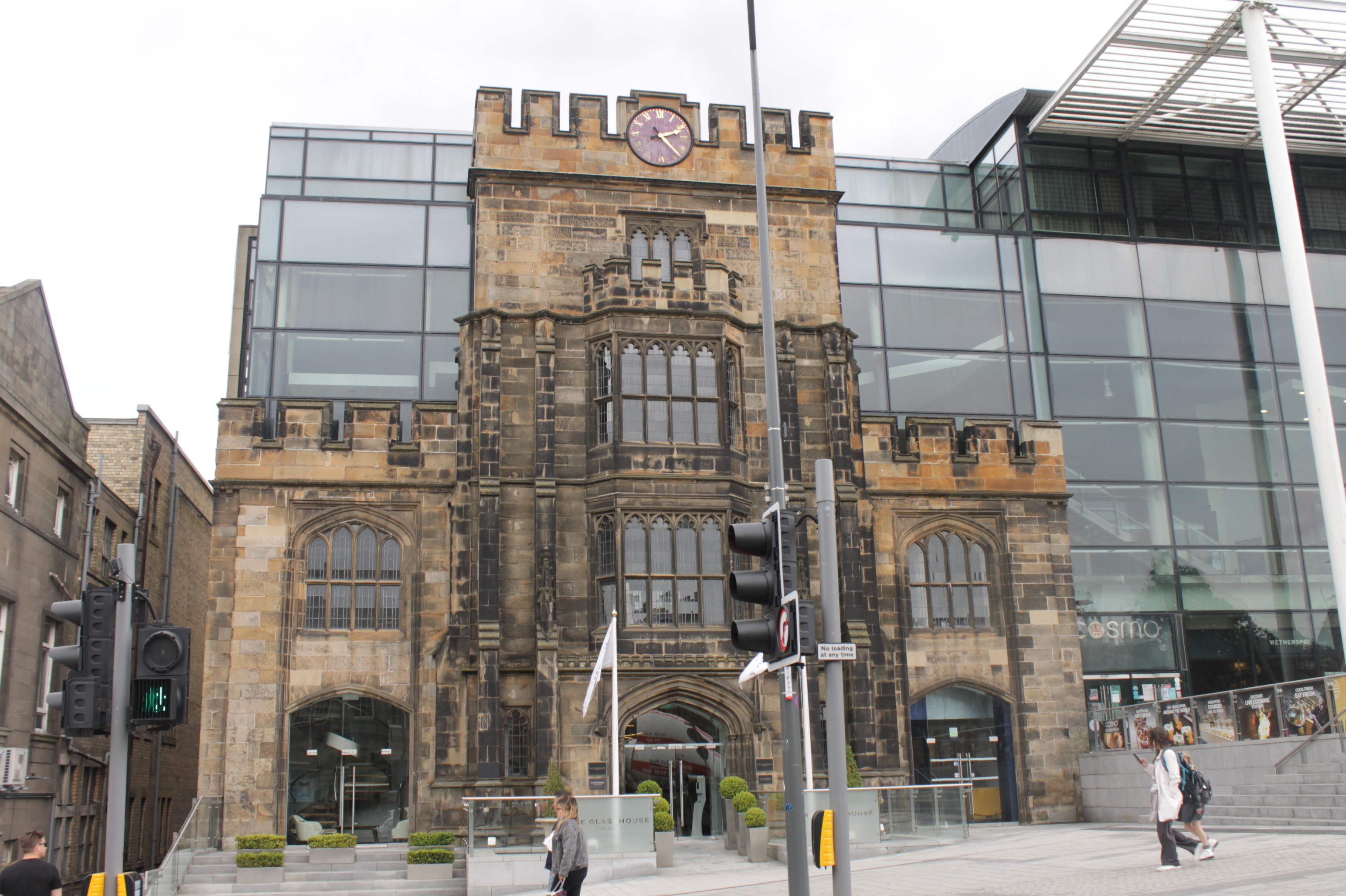
Frontage of Lady Glenorchy's Free Church, Greenside Place, Edinburgh

Bonar was born in Edinburgh on 20 June 1801. He was descended from the Bonars of Kilgraston with multiple ministers in his lineage. He was the eldest son of James Bonar the Solicitor of the Excise for Scotland. His mother was Marjory Pyott Maitland. He was a brother of Horatius Bonar and Andrew Bonar. They lived at Paterson's Court in the Broughton district of Edinburgh. Paterson's Court lay next to Broughton Market at the west end of what is now Barony Street.

He trained as a lawyer under his uncle Charles Tawse who had married his aunt Christiana Bonar. This training was at 32 Gayfield Square in Edinburgh. He did further training under James Gibson Craig, where he conscientiously objected to working on the Sabbath, before returning to Tawse as a junior partner, creating Tawse & Bonar WS.

In 1821 he joined the Homiletical Society. He was also secretary of The Diagnostic Society of Edinburgh. This was then meeting under the Tabernacle Church in Greenside, Edinburgh.

In 1830 he became an elder in Lady Glenorchy's Church in central Edinburgh, which was his whole family's place of worship. The minister was Rev Thomas Snell Jones. This stood close to Trinity College Kirk until both were replaced by what is now Waverley Station in the 1840s. Bonar also started adopting several other religious and philanthropic roles including the Edinburgh City Mission (trying to bring the poor back to the church), the Edinburgh Orphan Hospital (located next to Lady Glenorchy's Church), and the Society for Propagating Christian Knowledge in the Highlands and Islands. He was a director of the Edinburgh and Leith Seaman's Friend Society almost from its commencement in 1820 and held the office of secretary until he died. He was instrumental in the proposal to erect St Ninian's Church, an independent church for mariners in Leith which became a Free Church in 1843, having given freely of his professional services. Also, from time to time, he provided funds.

From 1834 Tawse & Bonar operated from 15 York Place where James lived with his widowed mother.

From 1833 to 1843 he was involved in the legal arguments of the "Ten Years' Conflict" within the Church of Scotland. At the creation of the Free Church of Scotland at the time of the Disruption of 1843, he provided legal support to the Free Church in several property arguments as to who owned the church buildings. In the case of Lady Glenorchy's Church, he was unsuccessful in defence of the Free Church in the lawsuit by the Established Church Edinburgh Presbytery which wrested control of the church including its endowments from the Free Church Trustees.

He organised the building of Lady Glenorchy's Free Church on Greenside Place, a huge church with multiple galleries, unusually accessed at upper level due to the steeply sloping Greenside Place - a site immediately south of the Tabernacle Church. In this move the minister of the pre-existing Lady Glenorchy's Church Rev George Ramsay Davidson, left the established church and became minister of this new Free Church at Greenside.

From 1843 when he joined the Free Church of Scotland he was Secretary to the Senatus of New College, Edinburgh.

He held a government appointment in connection with the Bible Printing Board for Scotland which was established by Queen Victoria in 1839 to prevent unlicensed editions of the King James Bible being circulated in Scotland.

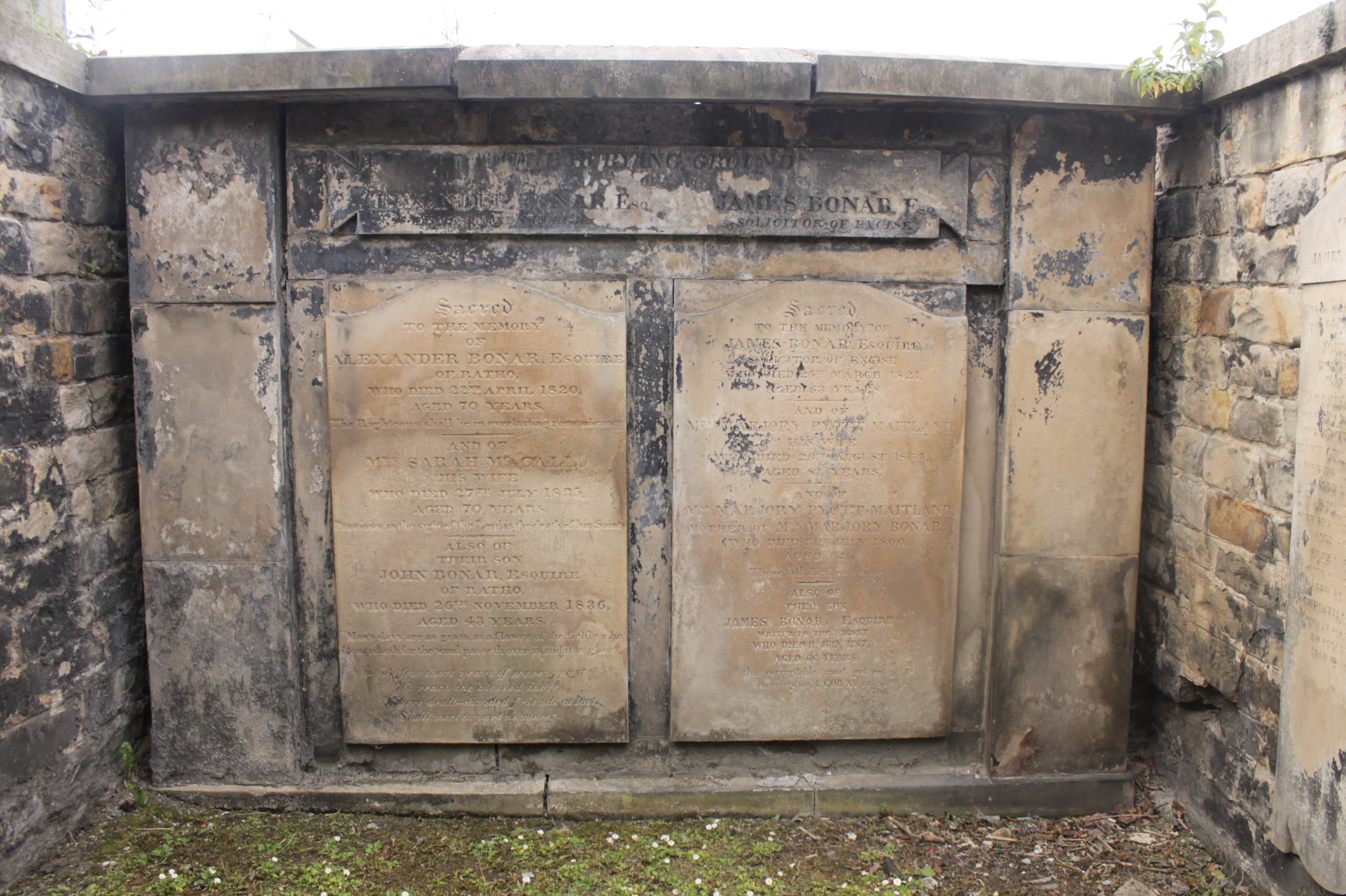
The grave of James Bonar, Canongate Kirkyard

In 1860 he was living alone at 15 York Place, Edinburgh, a ground floor and basement duplex within a Georgian tenement. He lived here for the rest of his life but also had a country residence in Juniper Green in the south-west outskirts of Edinburgh where he died on 11 July 1867. He is buried with his parents and other members of his family in Canongate Kirkyard. on the Royal Mile. The grave lies in the north-west corner of the eastern extension.

== Trivia ==
The frontage of Lady Glenorchy's Free Church is now incorporated into the hotel element of the Omni Centre in Edinburgh. The bulk of the building was demolished in 1985 and the frontage stood as a scaffolded structure for two decades before amalgamation with the new building.

Paterson's Court was demolished in 1938 to allow redevelopment as Council housing by the city architect, Ebenezer James MacRae.

== Family ==
Bonar was unmarried and had no children.

His older sister Margaret Bonar (1796–1869) married his business colleague Andrew Tawse WS (1788–1851).
