= List of listed buildings in Drumblade =

This is a list of listed buildings in the parish of Drumblade in Aberdeenshire, Scotland.

== List ==
Name	Location	Date listed	Grid ref. (Note: Sometimes known as OSGB36, the grid reference (where provided) is based on the British national grid reference system used by the Ordnance Survey. • "Guide to National Grid". Ordnance Survey. • "Get-a-map". Ordnance Survey.)	Geo-coordinates	Notes	LB number (Note: Historic Environment Scotland assign a unique alphanumeric identifier to each designated site in Scotland, for listed buildings this always begins with "LB", for example "LB12345".)	Image
Drumblade House				57°27′04″N 2°41′21″W	Category C(S)	2936	Upload Photo
Mains Of Newtongarry Dovecot				57°26′32″N 2°42′42″W	Category B	2941	Upload Photo
Greenkirtle, Upper Pirriesmill Near Huntly				57°26′26″N 2°46′51″W	Category B	2942	Upload Photo
Drumblade Former Parish Manse Outbuildings Including Bothy				57°27′02″N 2°41′19″W	Category C(S)	2937	Upload Photo
Pirriesmill, Central Range And North Range				57°26′58″N 2°46′22″W	Category C(S)	47401	Upload Photo
Rose Cottage (Former Toll-House) Battlehill, Near Huntly				57°26′36″N 2°46′27″W	Category C(S)	2943	Upload Photo
Lessendrum House Dovecot				57°27′42″N 2°41′47″W	Category B	2939	Upload Photo
Kirkton Mill				57°26′44″N 2°41′21″W	Category B	2940	Upload Photo
Cocklarachy				57°25′32″N 2°46′53″W	Category B	2945	Upload Photo
Drumblade Parish Church				57°27′03″N 2°41′16″W	Category B	2971	Upload another image
Lessendrum House				57°27′45″N 2°42′15″W	Category C(S)	2938	Upload Photo
Lessendrum Home Farm				57°27′40″N 2°42′33″W	Category C(S)	50133	Upload Photo
Drumblade Parish Churchyard				57°27′02″N 2°41′15″W	Category C(S)	2935	Upload another image
Greenhaugh Farmhouse				57°25′50″N 2°47′57″W	Category B	2944	Upload Photo

== Key ==
The scheme for classifying buildings in Scotland is:

- Category A: "buildings of national or international importance, either architectural or historic; or fine, little-altered examples of some particular period, style or building type."
- Category B: "buildings of regional or more than local importance; or major examples of some particular period, style or building type, which may have been altered."
- Category C: "buildings of local importance; lesser examples of any period, style, or building type, as originally constructed or moderately altered; and simple traditional buildings which group well with other listed buildings."

In March 2016 there were 47,288 listed buildings in Scotland. Of these, 8% were Category A, and 50% were Category B, with the remaining 42% being Category C.

== See also ==
- List of listed buildings in Aberdeenshire
