= George Ramsay Davidson =

Scottish religious minister (1801–1890)

George Ramsay Davidson (1801–1890) was a Scottish minister in the 19th century who was senior minister of Lady Glenorchy's Church at Low Calton and Lady Glenorchy's Free Church at Greenside, both in Edinburgh.

== Life ==
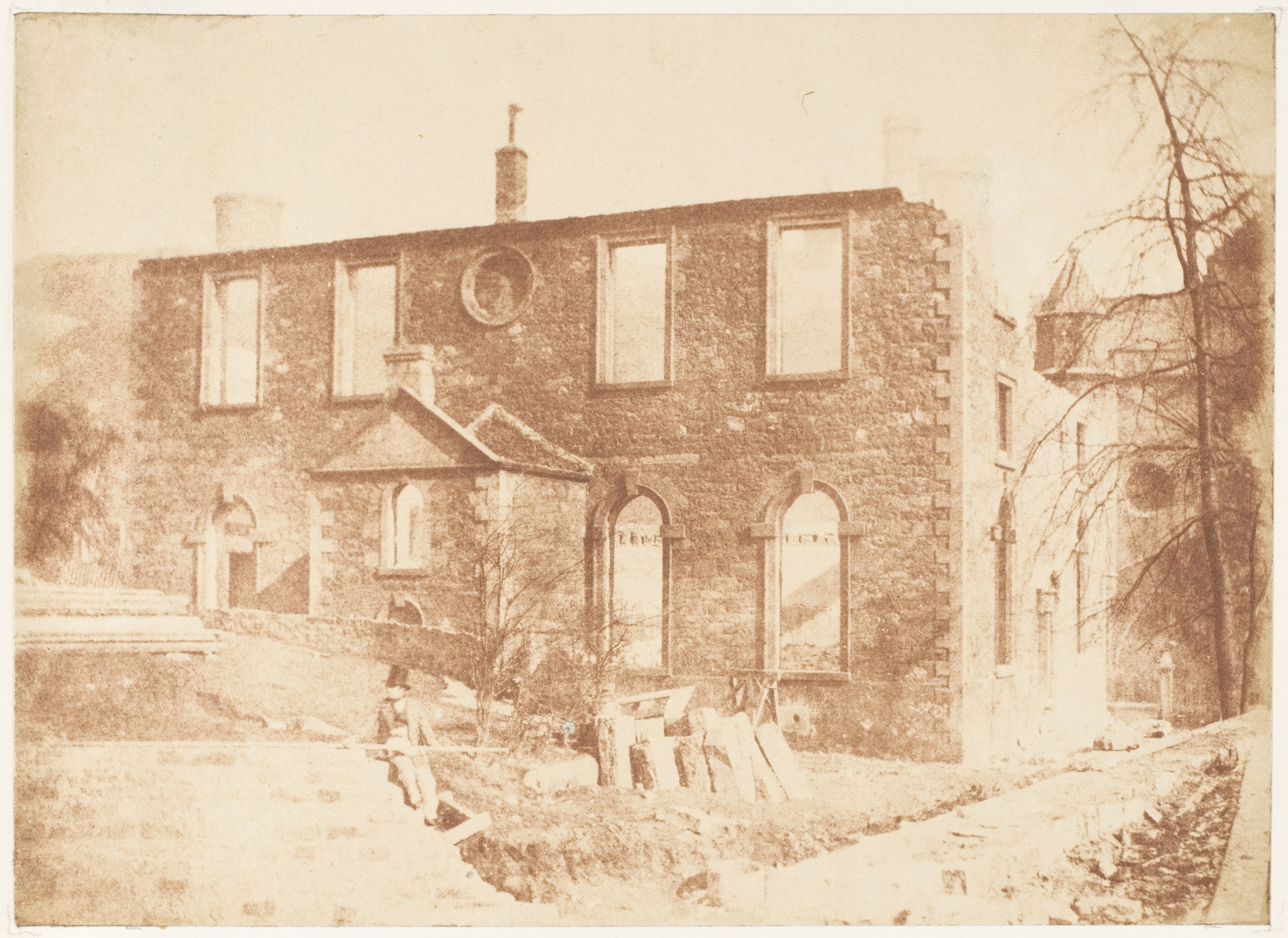
Lady Glenorchy's Church from west (during demolition in 1846/7)

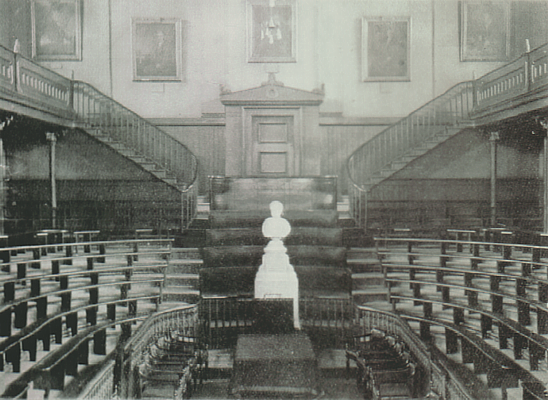
The school hall at the Royal High school

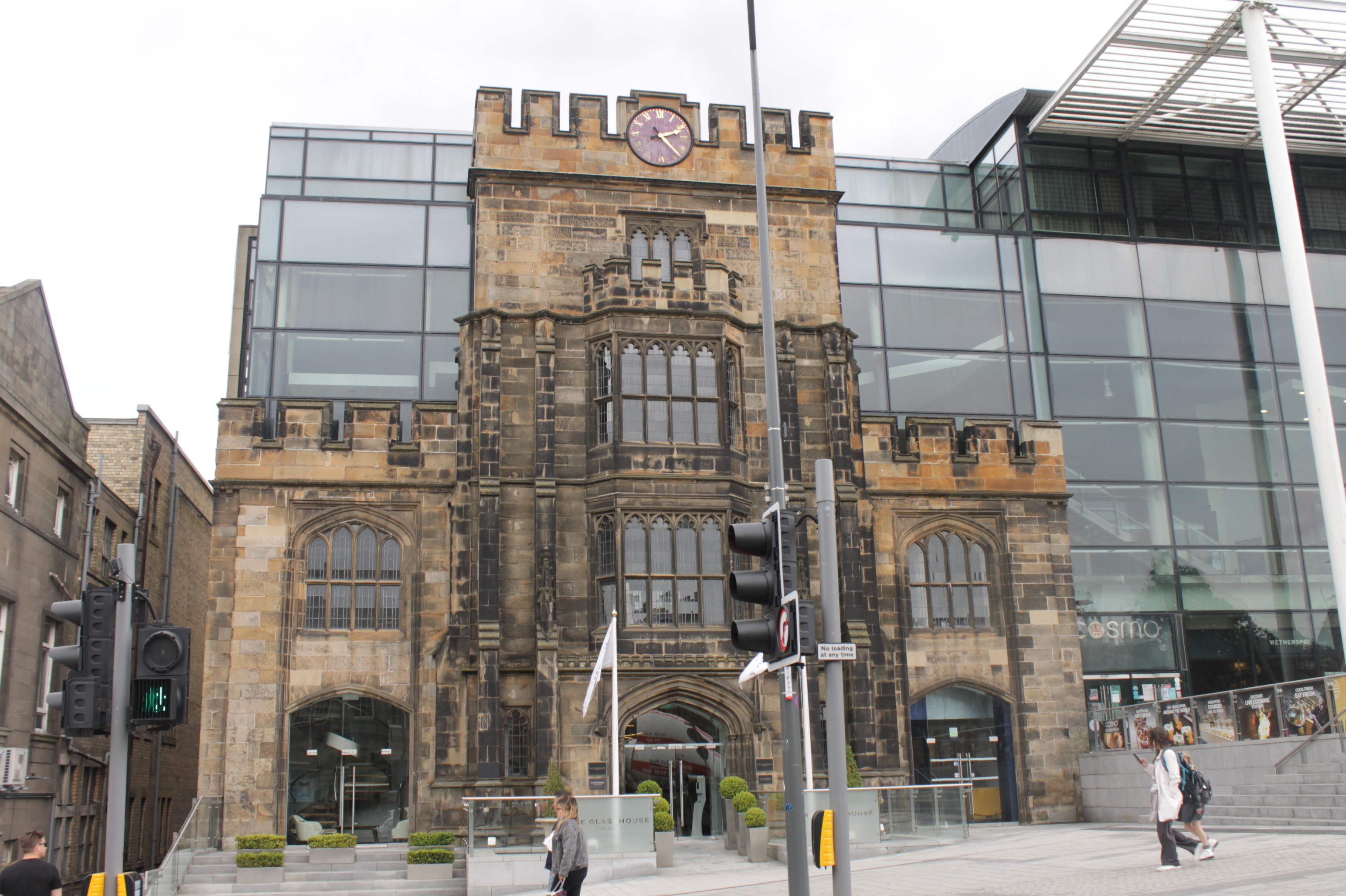
Lady Glenorchy's Free Church facade

He was born in Brechin in 1801 the son of David Davidson. He was educated at Brechin Grammar School and then studied at St Andrews University, graduating MA in 1820. He was licensed to preach as a Church of Scotland minister by the Presbytery of St Andrews in 1823 but initially failed to find a patron. He was ordained as minister of Drumblade in Aberdeenshire in May 1828.

In July 1842 he replaced Thomas Liddell at Lady Glenorchy's Church in central Edinburgh. Given Glenorchy's long tradition of Nonconformism and distancing from the established church, it was inevitable in the Disruption of 1843 that Davidson and the bulk of his congregation left to join the Free Church of Scotland. As they waited for their new church to be built at Greenside Place they met at the school halls of the Royal High School, Edinburgh on nearby Calton Hill.

Meanwhile, Brechin architect John Henderson, a childhood friend of Davidson, was building the new church: one of the largest in the city and on one of the city's most awkward sites. The site in Greenside stretched from the upward plateau down a steep slope more than 10m high. The resultant building looked conventional from the front, but entered on an upper gallery level relative to the floor of the huge interior, with multiple galleries, more like a theatre than a church. It held 1500 people.

The building was completed and occupied in 1846. Davidson took residence a few doors to the north at 2 Baxters Place. The huge Georgian townhouse had previously been the home of Robert Stevenson the lighthouse designer.

He retired fully in 1880 and moved to 1 Laverockbank Terrace in the Trinity district. He died at home on 17 May 1890.

== Family ==
In 1830 he married Jessie Lumsden, daughter of William Lumsden, an Edinburgh architect.

His daughter Eliza Maule Davidson (b.1831) married Thomas Clark an Edinburgh publisher who later became Sir Thomas Clark, 1st Baronet. They named their first son Thomas George Ramsay Davidson Clark in memory of Rev Davidson.

His daughter Mary (b.1833) married Rev Alexander Cusin (1835-1890), who became his assistant in the church from 1865 and succeeded him on retiral.

His first son, also George Ramsay Davidson, was born in 1836 and David William Davidson was born in 1838.

== Publications ==
- Privilege and Duty, a Pastoral Address (1845)
