= Edinburgh Street Food =

- Interactive map of the Edinburgh Street Food area

General information
- Location: Omni Centre, Leith Street, Edinburgh, Scotland
- Coordinates: 55.9559°N 3.1863°W
- Opened: February 2023

Technical details
- Floor area: 900 m^{2}

Other information
- Seating capacity: 550 (combined indoor and outdoor)

Website
- edinburgh-street-food.com

Edinburgh Street Food (ESF) is a year-round, covered street food market in central Edinburgh, Scotland. It was opened in February 2023 inside the Omni Centre on Leith Street.

Edinburgh Street Food is part of the Carlowrie Group.

== History ==
Prior to ESF, Edinburgh's street food scene relied on seasonal events such as the Pitt Street Food Market, which closed in 2021. Former city residents Andrew Marshall and Ben MacMillan envisioned a weather-proof, European-style market that could operate year-round, and they developed it on a site in the Omni Centre that had been unused for over a decade. It was officially inaugurated on 25 February 2023. Due to his contributions to Edinburgh's street food scene, Andrew Marshall was included in The List Hot 100 2023.

== Venue ==
ESF occupies a self-contained corner of the Omni Centre with its own street-level entrance. More than 200 seats are provided in a neon-lit food hall, with a further 250 on the heated, covered terrace. Three bars focus on Scottish craft drinks, about 70 percent of draught beer coming from Edinburgh breweries.

== Vendors and cuisine ==
At launch the market hosted ten permanent kitchens, among them include Junk, Bundits, Chix, What Le Duck, Antojitos, The Peruvian, House of Tapas, Homies, Fabbrica and SoftCore. Subsequent additions include Razzo Pizza Napoletana, which opened its second city branch at ESF in 2025, Sister Bao, and Harajuku. Guest traders and live events are programmed throughout the year, giving the roster a rotating character.. Currently Edinburgh Street food has ten vendors: "Fred's", "Antojitos", "Soft Core", "Eddie's", "Lazeez", "Hook and Heat", "Razzo", "Haldi", "Brasas", "Harajuku" and two bars.

== Reception and recognition ==
Critics have praised the market in general. The Scotsman called it "a welcome, relaxed and efficient addition to the Edinburgh food scene." Several resident traders have earned industry honours: Junk won the British Street Food Awards and the European title in 2022, Bundits was Best Newcomer at the 2022 Edinburgh Restaurant Awards, and Antojitos took the Scottish Street Food Award the same year.

In 2024, ESF was a finalist in The Scotsman Scran Awards for Newcomer of the Year.
