= Stonyfield =

Stonyfield may refer to:

- Stonyfield Farm, New Hampshire, US
- Stoneyfield, also spelled Stonyfield, ancient stone circle near Huntly, Scotland
