= Sir Thomas Clark, 1st Baronet =

Scottish publisher and politician

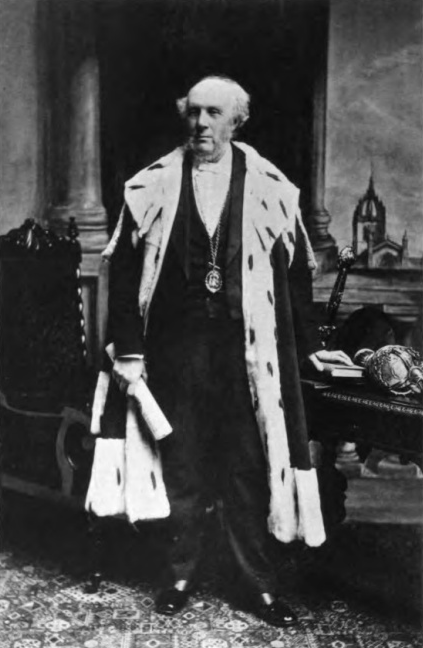
Sir Thomas Clark, Lord Provost of Edinburgh

Sir Thomas Clark FRSE DL (1823–1900) was a Scottish publisher and politician who served as Lord Provost of Edinburgh from 1885 to 1888.

== Life ==
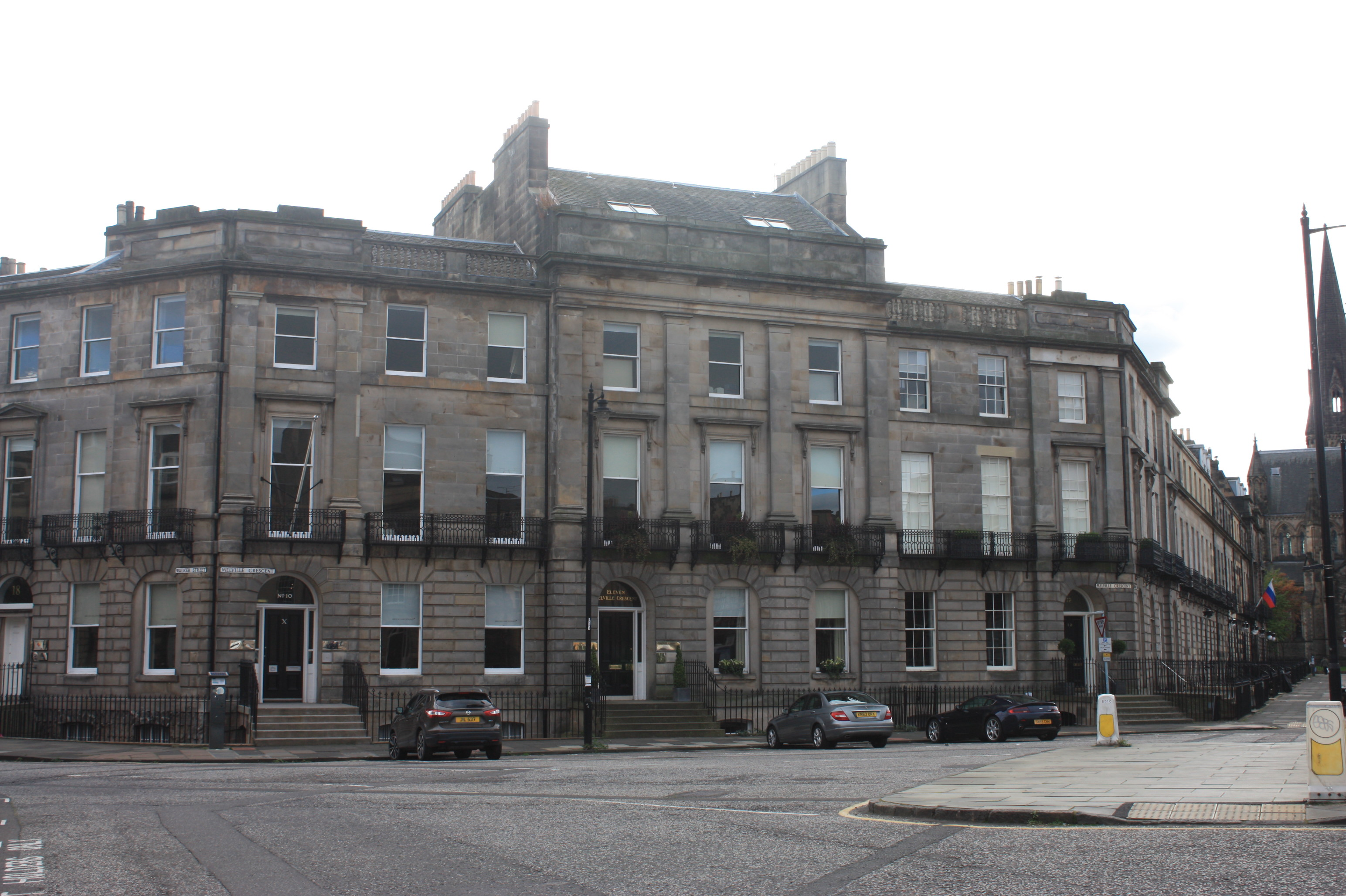
Sir Thomas Clark's house at Melville Crescent, Edinburgh

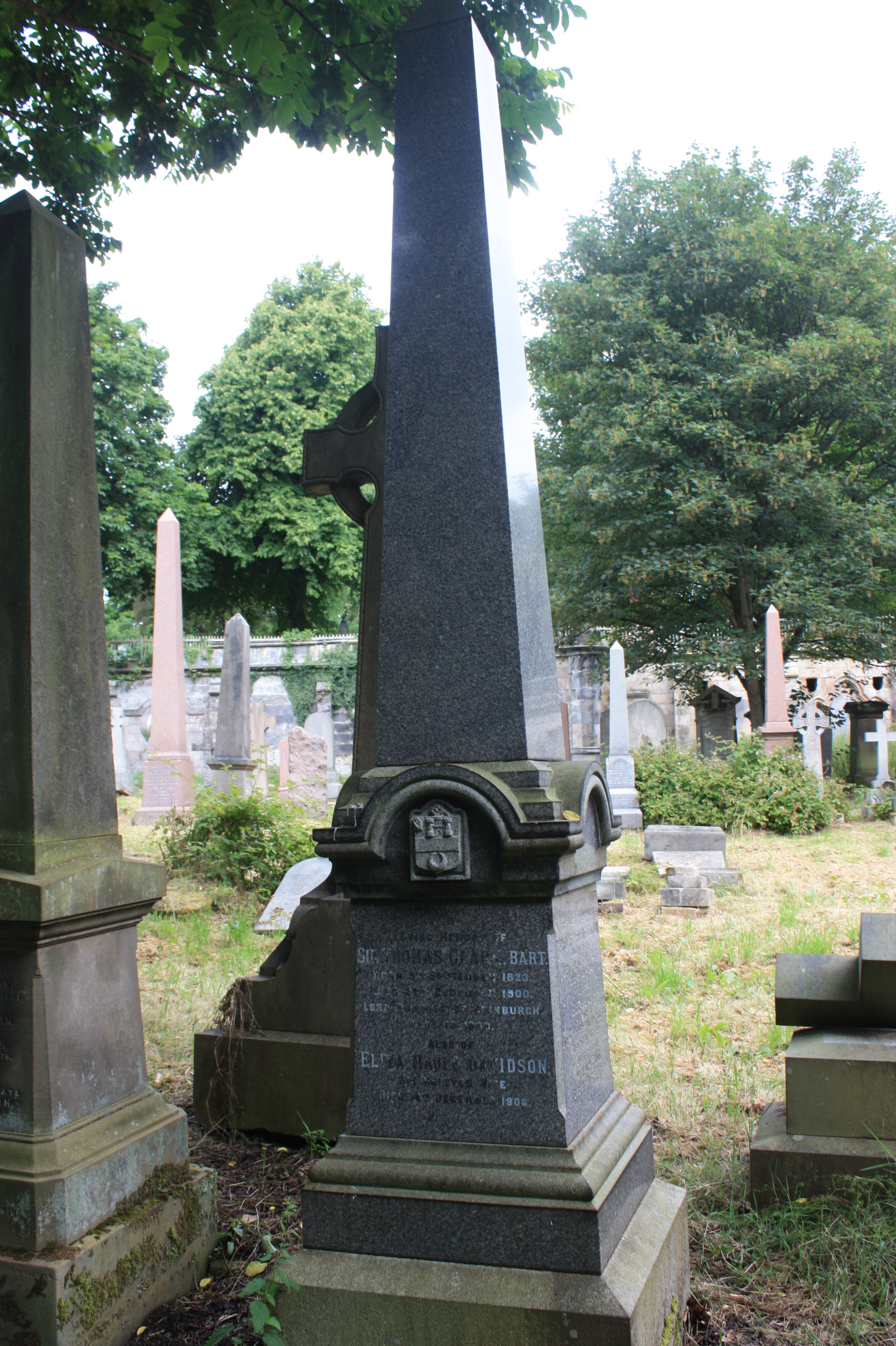
The grave of Sir Thomas Clark, Warriston Cemetery, Edinburgh

He was born in Edinburgh on 5 September 1823, the son of Margaret Lothian and John Clark, Convenor of Trades and City Baillie in Edinburgh. Thomas attended the Royal High School. From 1846 he was a partner in the family publishing firm of T&T Clark, based at 38 George Street in the centre of Edinburgh. The company specialised in law books. He rose to be proprietor of the company before leaving it to his son in 1886.

In 1877 he became a Town Councillor, rising to Bailie in 1883. As many before him, prior to serving as Lord Provost of Edinburgh from 1885 to 1888, he served as Master of the Merchant Company of Edinburgh 1883–4. At the height of his success in 1884 he is listed as living at 11 Melville Crescent in Edinburgh's fashionable West End.

He was made honorary vice-president of Edinburgh Choral Union (later Edinburgh Royal Choral Union) between 1885 and 1887.

He was elected a fellow of the Royal Society of Edinburgh in March 1886. His proposers included Sir Arthur Mitchell, Alexander Crum Brown, Alexander Kinnear, Lord Kinnear. Clark was created a baronet later in the same year. The baronetcy is entitled Baronet of Melville Crescent.

He died in Edinburgh on 24 December 1900. He is buried in Warriston Cemetery on the main diagonal path south of the vaults.

== Family ==
In 1851 he married Eliza Maule Davidson, daughter of Rev George Ramsay Davidson, minister of Lady Glenorchy's Free church in Edinburgh. They had five children. The eldest son, John Maurice Clark, inherited the baronetcy.

Clark's grandson was also Sir Thomas Clark and was also a Fellow of the Royal Society of Edinburgh. He was the 3rd Baronet of Melville Crescent.

== Portrait ==
He was painted by Sir John Lavery in 1889 to mark the visit of Queen Victoria.

Baronetage of the United Kingdom
New creation	Baronet (of Melville Crescent); 1886–1900	Succeeded by John Clark
