= Lady Glenorchy's Church =

Church building in Edinburgh, Scotland

Coordinates: 55°57′24″N 3°11′08″W

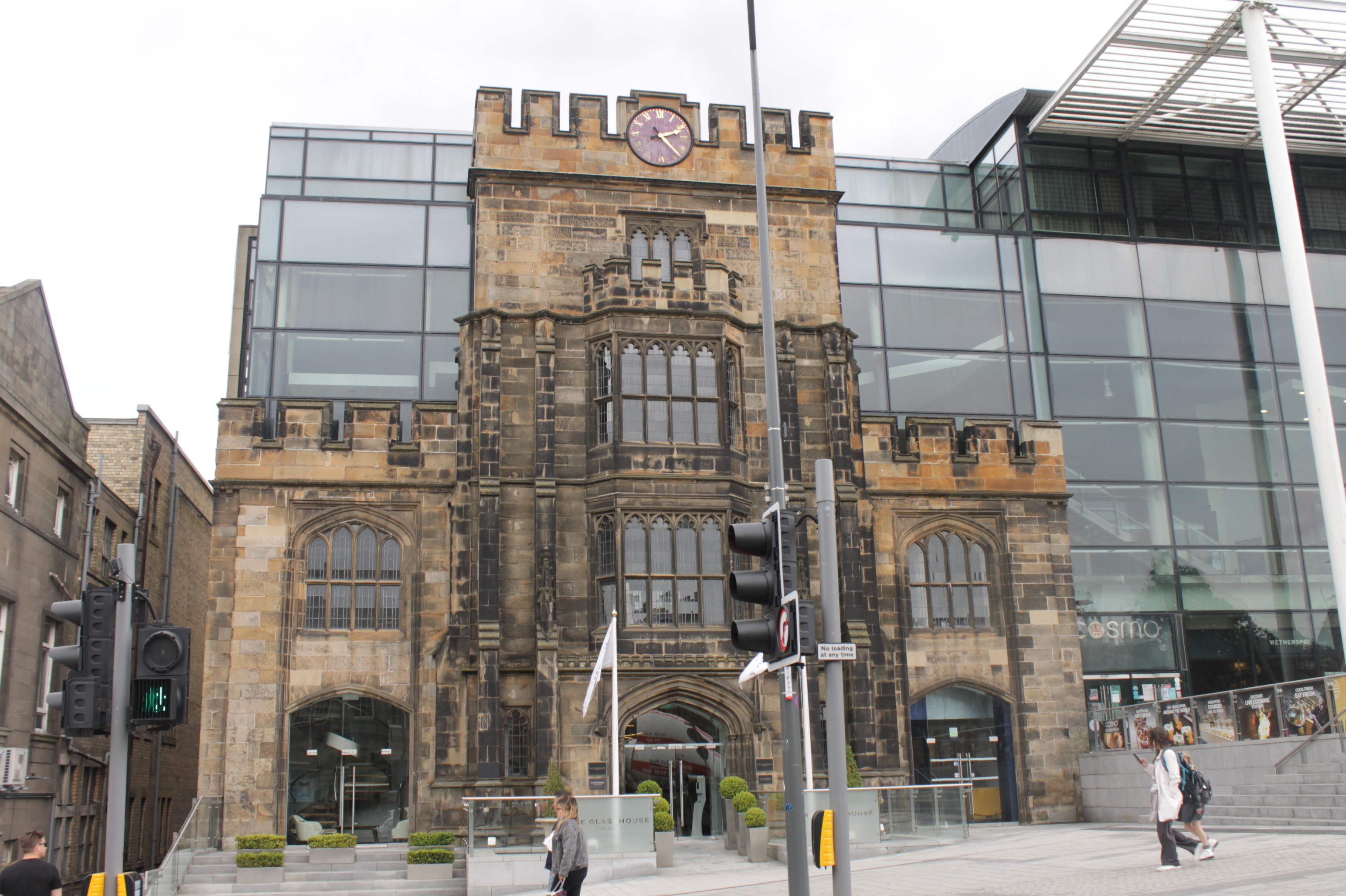
The facade of the Glasshouse Hotel, formerly Lady Glenorchy's Free Church at Greenside

Lady Glenorchy's Church or Chapel in Edinburgh was a church founded in the late 18th century adjacent to Trinity College Kirk by Willielma Campbell, Viscountess Glenorchy. It was demolished in 1846 by the North British Railway. At this time, a replacement Free Church was erected at Greenside. Most of this church was demolished in the late 20th century, with the retained facade forming the frontage of the Glasshouse Hotel on the site.

== History ==
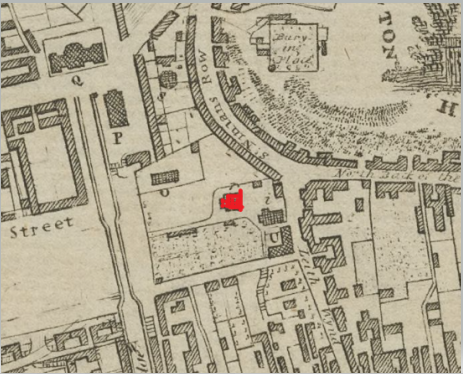
Detail of 1778 map of Edinburgh showing location of Lady Glenorchy's Church

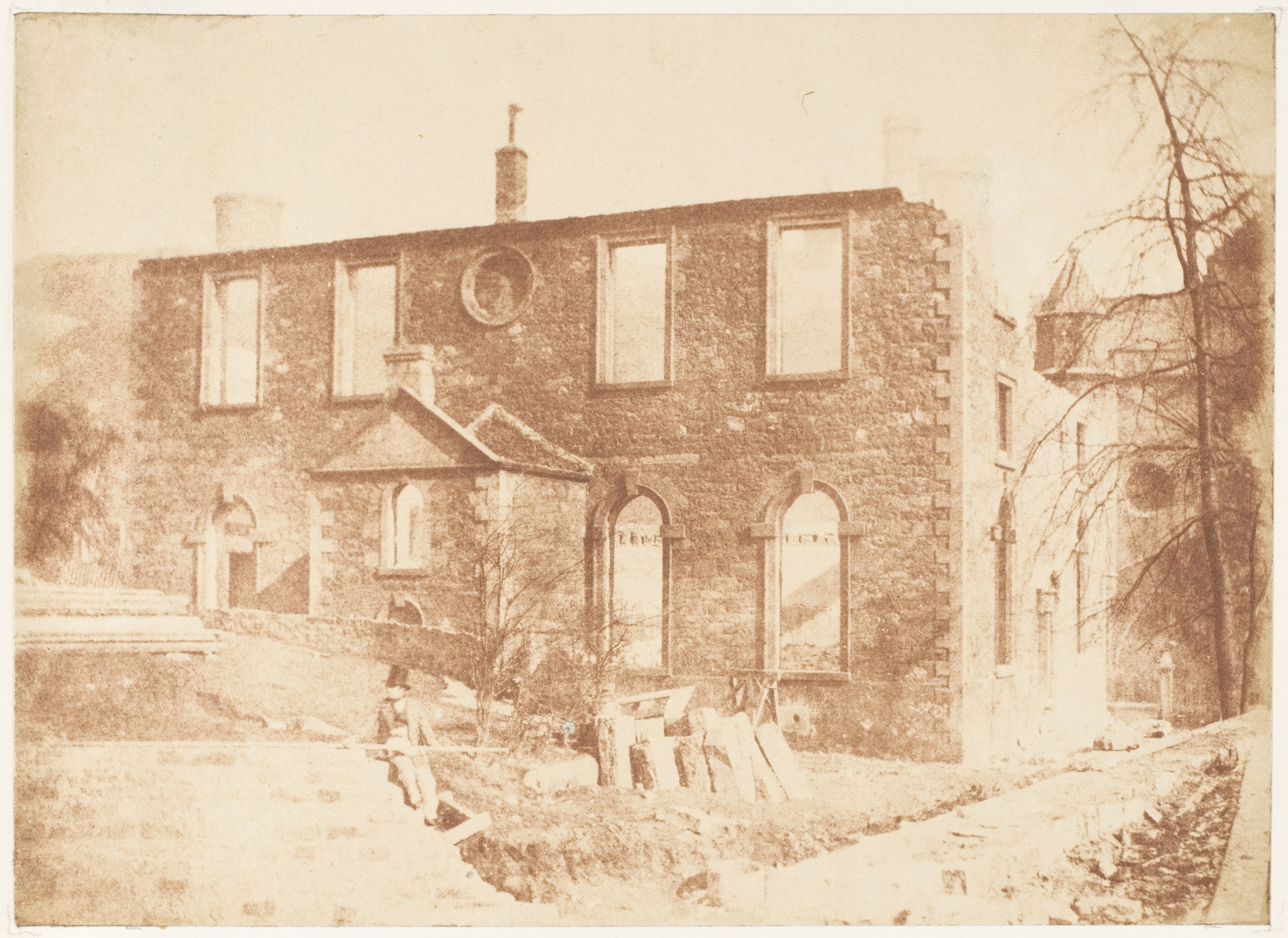
Lady Glenorchy's Church from west (during demolition in 1846/7)

The chapel was founded by Willielma Campbell, Viscountess Glenorchy. Her husband James Campbell had died in 1771 and she was left very wealthy. Under the influence of several people, in particular Jane Hill, Rowland Hill's sister, she became a major patron of the Church of Scotland both in her financial support of ministers and in her construction of several chapels, built at her own expense. In Edinburgh this led to the building of "Lady Glenorchy's Chapel" on a piece of low-lying ground between the Old Town to the south, and the village of Low Calton and the Calton Hill to the north. This ground, part of its garden ground, was feued from the Edinburgh Orphan Hospital. The church lay midway between the orphan hospital to the north-west, and the medieval Trinity College Kirk to the south-east. Building began in 1772 and was completed in 1774.

When the building was largely complete, Lady Glenorchy wrote to the Moderator of the Presbytery of Edinburgh in April 1774 seeking the approval of the Presbytery and explaining that the church was expressly aimed at the poor of the city and the alleviation of the overcrowded city churches. She also asked that the Presbytery approve her intention to have ministers of her choosing until a congregation was formed and a stated minister installed. The Presbytery was unanimously in favour of Lady Glenorchy's position and in May 1774 the first service of the church was taken by Rev Robert Walker of St Giles' Cathedral and Rev Dr John Erskine of Greyfriars Kirk.

Because of difficulties with the Presbytery, Lady Glenorchy's choice of ministers both declined the charge, although the Presbytery eventually agreed to install her minister and that he should be in communion with the Church of Scotland. In the meantime, some Church of Scotland clergy who were opposed to her church, appealed to the Synod of Lothian and Tweeddale. When the matter came before the Synod, it forbade all ministers within the Synod's bounds to serve in Lady Glenorchy's church. The Edinburgh Presbytery appealed this ruling to the General Assembly of the Church of Scotland which reversed it. This left the way clear for Lady Glenorchy, in 1776, to invite Dr Thomas Snell Jones, a Wesleyan Methodist, to accept the charge of her church. After being ordained by the Scottish Presbytery of London, he took up his post in 1779, a position he held for fifty eight years until three years before his death in 1837.

Lady Glenorchy insisted on and maintained her full personal control until 1786 when, six months before her death, she transferred control to five trustees, all elders of the church. The constitution was revised by Act of Parliament in 1837 and the church was then made a quoad sacra parish.

The church first appears on Andrew Bell's map of 1773 which illustrates a simple box roughly similar in size to the adjacent Trinity College Church, with an entrance porch on the west side in the traditional pattern. It held up to 2000 people.

At the Disruption of 1843 when the Free Church split from the established Church of Scotland, the bulk of the congregation joined the Free Church. James Bonar unsuccessfully defended the Free Church members in the lawsuit brought by the Established Church Edinburgh Presbytery which wrested control of the church including its endowments from the Free Church Trustees. The Free Church members then had no position with regard to any compensation that may have been forthcoming from the railway company that bought the church in 1845. Their new church, Lady Glenorchy's Free Church at Greenside, Edinburgh had to be constructed with the resources of the Free Church. The new church was built (by John Henderson) and was completed in 1846.

From 1843 to 1846 the Free Church section of the congregation had met in the school hall of the Royal High School until completion of the new church in Greenside in 1846 at which time it had a congregation of 750.

In 1844 the North British Railway received its Act of Parliament and began to establish a station, later the Waverley station, nearby. In 1845 the railway company acquired the church from the established Church trustees and demolished it. Due to protracted litigation, it was not until 1856 that the Roxburgh Place Chapel, which had been owned by the Relief Church but which had passed into private ownership, was purchased as a replacement. This was created a quoad sacra parish in 1862.

The only picture of Lady Glenorchy's Chapel was taken by Hill & Adamson (whose studio was only 100m away) some time between 1843 and 1847. The photo (as seen on this page) is misidentified in some sources as "the orphan hospital", which was demolished at the same time having relocated to the Dean Orphanage in the early 1830s.

From 1900 the Church of Scotland and Free Church of Scotland partially reunified and the two buildings were thereafter known as Lady Glenorchy's North Church and Lady Glenorchy's South Church. The latter building was rebuilt in 1913 to designs by Peter MacGregor Chalmers and is now used as the Assembly Roxy.

== The Glasshouse Hotel ==
The Glasshouse Hotel
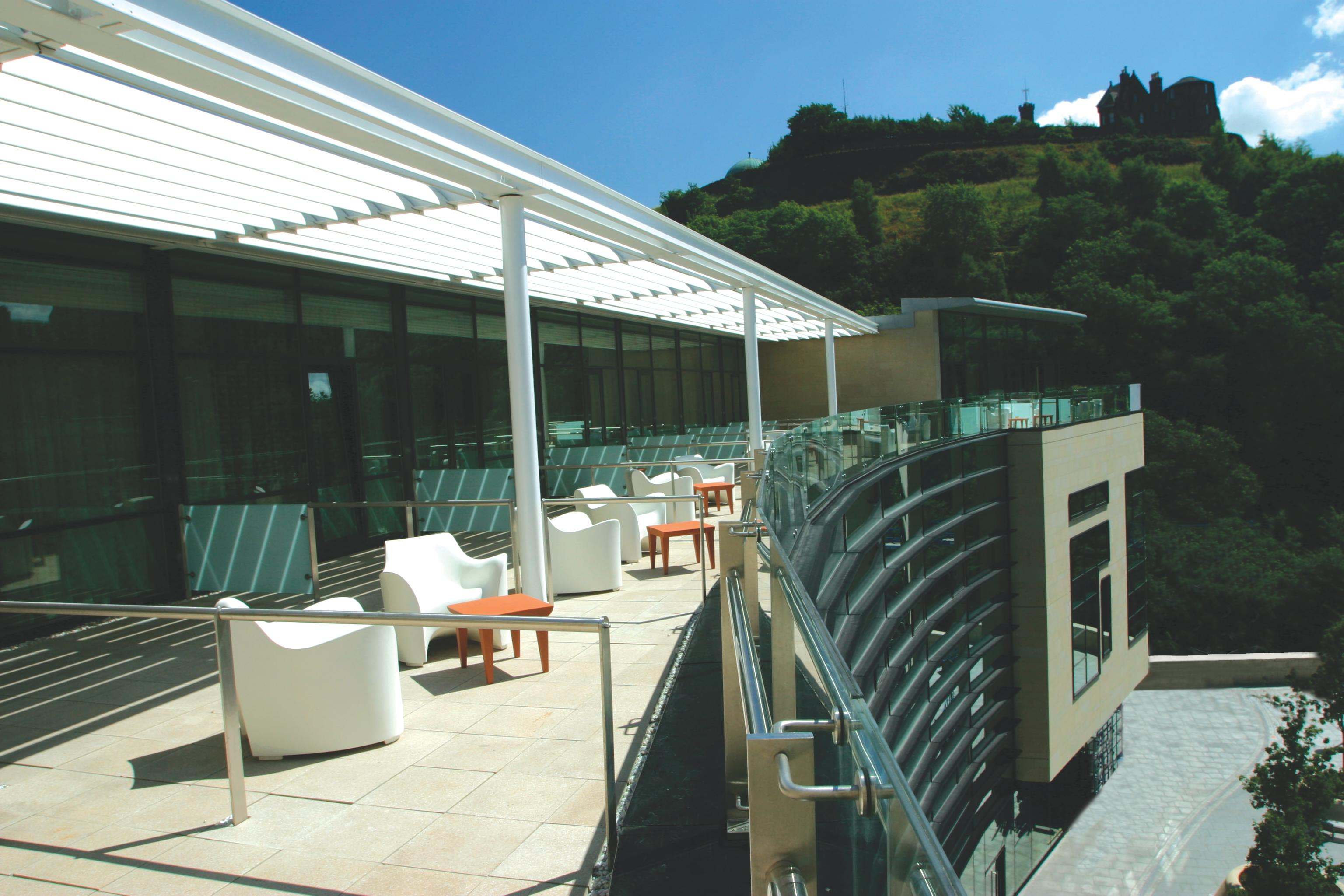
- Glasshouse hotel looking up to Calton Hill

General information
- Location: Edinburgh, Scotland
- Opening: June 2003; 23 years ago
- Owner: TripleB
- Operator: Autograph Collection Hotels

Technical details
- Floor count: 3

Other information
- Number of rooms: 77
- Number of suites: 20

Website
- theglasshousehotel.co.uk

Lady Glenorchy's North Church was renamed Hillside Church in 1956 when it merged with the Barony & St James Place Church in nearby Albany Street. Then in 1978 Hillside Church was vacated on merger with the Greenside Church in Royal Terrace. The former church was used for various purposes including as a carpet warehouse.

All but the facade of the Hillside Church (Lady Glenorchy's Free Church) was demolished in 1986 and now forms the frontage of the Glasshouse Hotel, part of the Omni Centre entertainment complex. The Glasshouse Hotel opened in June 2003. The hotel's lobby was renovated in a modern design in 2018. It is located on Greenside Place, next to the Playhouse Theatre, on the edge of Edinburgh's New Town.

== Burials ==
As the surrounding ground remained in use by the orphan hospital it was not used for burial. The nearby Old Calton Burial Ground served the needs of the parish. The only known burial was Lady Glenorchy herself, buried in the floor of the chapel in 1786. When the church was demolished she was exhumed and was re-interred at Roxburgh Place in 1859. Her body was exhumed again in 1972 when the church was deconsecrated.

== Ministers ==
- Francis Sherriff 1777 to 1778
- Thomas Snell Jones 1779 to 1837 assisted by David Dickson the Elder from 1792
- Greville Ewing 1793 to 1798
- John Purves 1826 to 1830
- James Begg 1830/31
- Thomas Liddell 1831 to 1841 moved to Canada
- George Ramsay Davidson 1842 to 1843 moved to Lady Glenorchy's Free Church

=== Roxburgh Place ===
- Daniel McLaren 1863 to 1874
- John Grigor 1874 to 1876
- Andrew Fyfe Burns 1877 to 1882
- Thomas Burns 1882 to 1920

=== Lady Glenorchy's Free Church, Greenside Place ===
- George Ramsay Davidson 1843 to 1890
- Second charge Alexander Cusin 1865 to 1890 (son-in-law of G R Davidson)
- James Harvey 1890 onwards

== Notable congregation members ==
- James Bonar Sr an elder in 1808
- James Bonar WS and Alexander Bonar elders from 1830 and their brothers Horatius Bonar and Andrew Bonar
- James Donaldson founder of Donaldson's School for the Deaf
- John Tawse WS, Bonar's business partner
