= Battle of Slioch =

Minor skirmish in the First War of Scottish Independence

Coordinates: 57.432°N 2.731°W

- Part of Wars of Scottish Independence
| Date | 25 to 28 December 1307 |
| Location | Slioch, Drumblade, 1 mile east of Huntly, Aberdeenshire, Scotland |
| Result | inconclusive |

Belligerents
| Scottish Crown | Rebels |

Commanders and leaders
| Prince Edward | Earl of Buchan |

The Battle of Slioch was a minor skirmish in the First War of Scottish Independence. Although the encounter was inconclusive, the domestic enemies of the Scottish King Robert Bruce were unable to stop him from consolidating his rule over Scotland.

== Background ==
With his victory against the English at the Battle of Loudoun Hill, Robert Bruce's support among the Scots was rising. However, he still had many opponents in Scotland. Foremost among them was John Comyn, Earl of Buchan, whose cousin John III Comyn Bruce had killed. In July 1307, King Edward I of England died, and his less effectual son Edward II ascended the throne. This gave Bruce the opportunity to deal with his local enemies. After attacking the MacDoualls in Galloway and the MacDougalls in Lorne, he moved north-east towards Buchan's base near Inverness. Bruce's forces now greatly outnumbered those of Buchan, and his victory appeared certain. However, before reaching battle Bruce was struck ill, forcing him to retreat and rest at Slioch.

== Skirmish ==
The Earl of Buchan took advantage of this respite to raise an army and attempt to weaken or drive off Robert Bruce. On Christmas Day Buchan's forces reached Slioch, where the royal forces were commanded by Bruce's brother Edward. An archery battle ensued, but neither side was able to gain an advantage, and Buchan withdrew. According to historian A. F. Murison, "On three successive days there occurred skirmishes between bodies of archers, Buchan's men getting the worst of the encounter day after day. Buchan's force, however, was continuously getting additions, while Bruce was getting pinched with hunger. Placing the King in his litter again, Bruce's men changed quarters, marching slowly in fighting order, with their sick chief in the centre, and restricting themselves rigidly to defence. They took up position in Strathogie, a little further north, and Buchan's force abandoned the pursuit and dispersed."

Several days later, Buchan returned, but again found Bruce's force too strong and was forced to withdraw. A few months later, Bruce had sufficiently recovered to resume his offensive against his Scottish opponents. He was carried along with his army as they captured some more Scottish castles, and then onwards to Inverurie. There the King of Scotland and John Comyn, Earl of Buchan would finally fight a decisive battle.

== Sources ==
- Barbour, John. The Brus (Book 9). (Duncan, A A M ed.). Retrieved on 2007-05-27.
- Innes, Ewan J. (11 November 1989). "Why was Robert I so successful between 1308 and 1314".
- "Bruce Clan Crest, Motto and History". Archived from the original on 9 May 2007.
- "Robert Bruce (1307)".
