= Alexander Oustean =

Scottish tailor and member of Edinburgh burgh council

Alexander Oustean or Oustian or Austin (died 1604) was a Scottish tailor and member of Edinburgh burgh council.

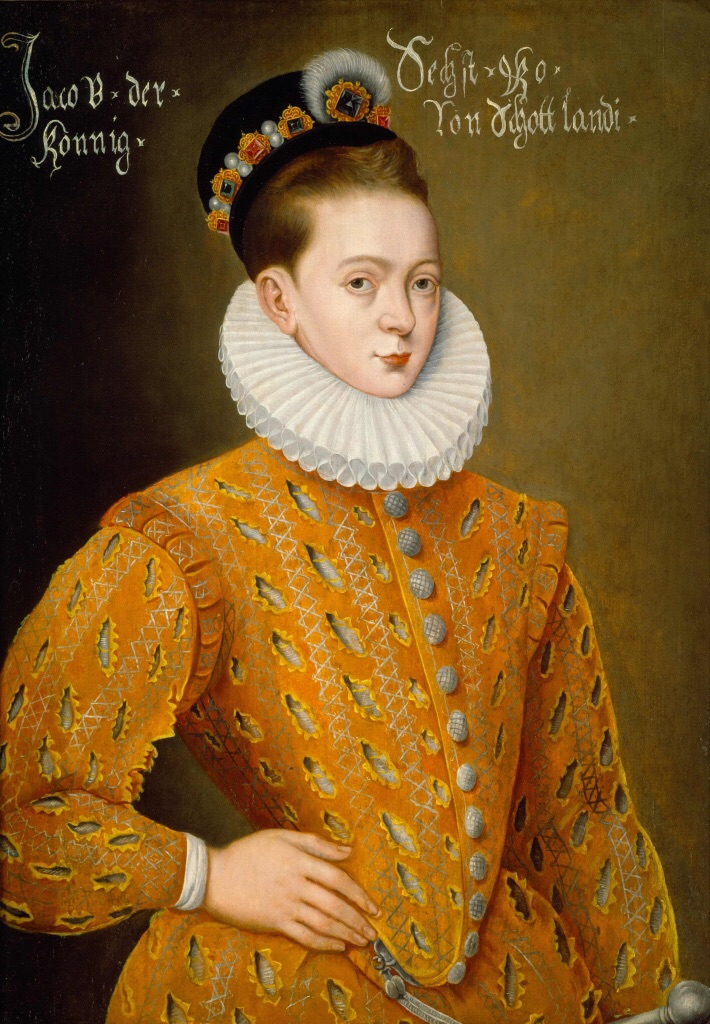
James VI and I, by Adrian Vanson, Edinburgh Castle

== Career ==
He became a burgess of Edinburgh on 26 May 1560. He was Deacon of Crafts and Craft Councillor in 1582. Oustean undertook a variety of duties for the council, acting as a pricer of wines and timber in 1590, and was often sent as the town's representative or commissioner to the Convention of Royal Burghs. In October 1589 he was sent with the merchant Richard Doby to meet the builders of a new house or hospital for lepers at the Chapel of the Rood by Greenside, to design or set out the bounds of the site and building.

Alexander Oustean sided with the vocal party of Edinburgh merchants who wished James VI of Scotland to marry a Danish bride rather than Catherine de Bourbon, the sister of Henry of Navarre. Oustean was wealthy, and was a financial guarantor or "cautionar" of the expenses of George Keith, 5th Earl Marischal during the negotiations for the marriage of Anne of Denmark and James VI. He was involved as a burgh commissioner with John Arnot at the Convention of Burghs for raising a tax for the royal marriage. On 28 May 1589 Arnot and the baillies of Edinburgh and some of the burgesses came to Holyrood House and protested to the Chancellor, John Maitland of Thirlestane that the king should marry a Danish princess. An account of expenses relating to the marriage and the English subsidy, kept by Jean Fleming, the "Lady Chancellor", includes a payment of £292-13s-4d Scots made to "Allexander Anstien taillour".

In July 1590 Arnot and Oustean as commissioners for the burgh of Edinburgh contracted to borrow from the Comptroller of Scotland, David Seton of Parbroath, the sum of £100,000 Scots and pay the king £4000 yearly. In April 1594 they were required to repay the remainder of the loan to the comptroller in order to pay the expenses of resisting the rebel Francis Stewart, 5th Earl of Bothwell.

in 1597 the burgh council of Edinburgh recognised that "Alexander Owsteane" was looking after three poor children and employed a nurse to look after them. Oustean was therefore exempted from paying a monthly charge for the benefit of poor people in Edinburgh.

== Family connections ==
Alexander Oustean was a close relation of Katherine Oustean, who married the goldsmith George Heriot (died 1610), and had two daughters Agnes and Marion Heriot, who married John Houston. Alexander Oustean's eldest son was also called "Alexander Oustean". After he died in 1604, his second son George Oustean was his executor. Gilbert, who became a tailor, David, and Andrew Oustean were the youngest sons. He had at least four daughters; Sara Ousteane married another Edinburgh tailor John Elder, Marion Ousteane married a lawyer William Wylie, another daughter married Roger Duikesone, and Elizabeth Oustean married George Fraser.

A younger son, John Oustean, was involved in a riot in Edinburgh on 17 December 1596. The riot targeted the financial administration of the Octavians. James VI was in the Tolbooth of Edinburgh with most of the Privy Council and the Octavians. After a sermon given by Walter Balcanquhall in St Giles, the congregation came out crying "the sword of Gideon" and some called for arms. The royal guard escorted James VI back to Holyroodhouse. Subsequently, Alexander Oustean was among a group of burgesses selected to make the town's peace and reconciliation with James VI in March 1597. The others were John Arnot, Littil, Moresoun, Edward Galbraith a skinner, and the goldsmith George Heriot.

George Oustean (died 1616), who married Margaret Tod (died 1635), became a merchant burgess of Edinburgh. He supplied goods to John Campbell, Laird of Cawdor, in 1615, including a hat for the young laird, cloth for the costume of the family's harp player, and a piccadill. In 1616 he supplied cloth for the clothes of the laird's son Duncan Campbell, and the gowns and sleeves of the laird's daughter, and provided a muff for her hands.

The surname is also found as "Austin" or "Oistiane", "Ousteane", or "Owsteane". Margaret Asteane, the midwife of Mary, Queen of Scots in 1566 may have been a relation.
