= Thomas Liddell (principal) =

Canadian minister and academic (1800–1880)

- Queen's Founder Rev. Dr. Thomas Liddell
- Born: October 18, 1800; St. Ninians, Stirlingshire, Scotland
- Died: June 11, 1880 (aged 79); Edinburgh, Scotland

Thomas Liddell (October 18, 1800 – June 11, 1880) was the first Principal of Queen's University, then Queen's College.

== Life ==
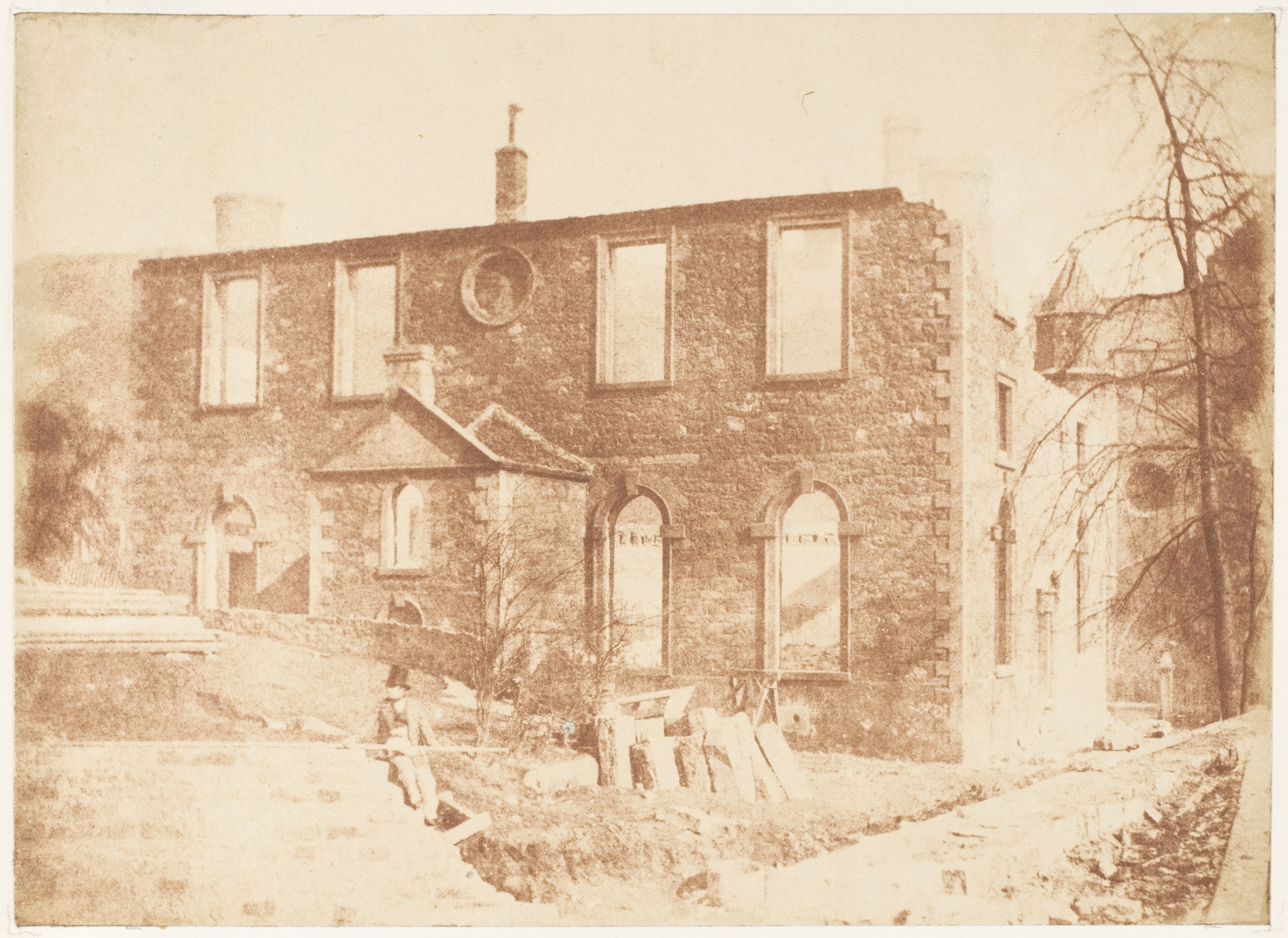
Lady Glenorchy's Church from west (during demolition in 1846/7)

Liddell was born in Stirlingshire, Scotland in 1800, the son of John Liddell and his wife Janet Martin. He studied at the University of Edinburgh and the University of Glasgow.

He moved from Montrose Chapel of Ease to Lady Glenorchy's Church in Edinburgh in December 1831. He worked alongside the elderly Rev Thomas Snell Jones. His senior, James Bonar WS, was at this time organising the physical relocation of the church due to the known coming of Waverley Railway Station. The University of Edinburgh awarded him an honorary Doctorate of Divinity in 1841.

In 1841, he left Edinburgh for Canada where he was appointed the first Principal of Queen's College, Kingston. Here he worked with only one other member of staff, Peter Colin Campbell. Due to issues arising from the Disruption of 1843 in Scotland, funding dried up. Liddell resigned in 1846 and returned to Scotland.

He was minister of Lochmaben in Dumfries and Galloway from 1850 to 1880. He died in Edinburgh on 11 June 1880.

== Family ==
He was married to Susan Ann Jane Stewart, with whom he had two daughters.

== Recognition ==
A street in Kingston, Ontario is named for him.

Academic offices
Preceded by New position	Principal of Queen's College at Kingston; 1841–1846	Succeeded by John Machar
