= Helen Denerley =

Scottish sculptor

Helen Denerley (born 1956) is a Scottish sculptor. Much of her work is made from reused scrap and is inspired by the animal world.

Notable public sculpture includes Dreaming Spires (two giraffes) in front of the Omni Centre on Leith Walk, Edinburgh, unveiled in July 2005. Other works include Dragons at the Eniwa Garden Project, Hokkaido, Japan; various sculptures at the Horizon Enterprise Park, Forres; and a large fossil at the Hugh Miller Museum, Cromarty.

Denerley lives in Strathdon, Aberdeenshire.
