= Greenside, Edinburgh =

District and parish in Edinburgh

Coordinates: 55.957°N 3.185°W

Greenside is a district and parish in Edinburgh between Calton Hill and the New Town.

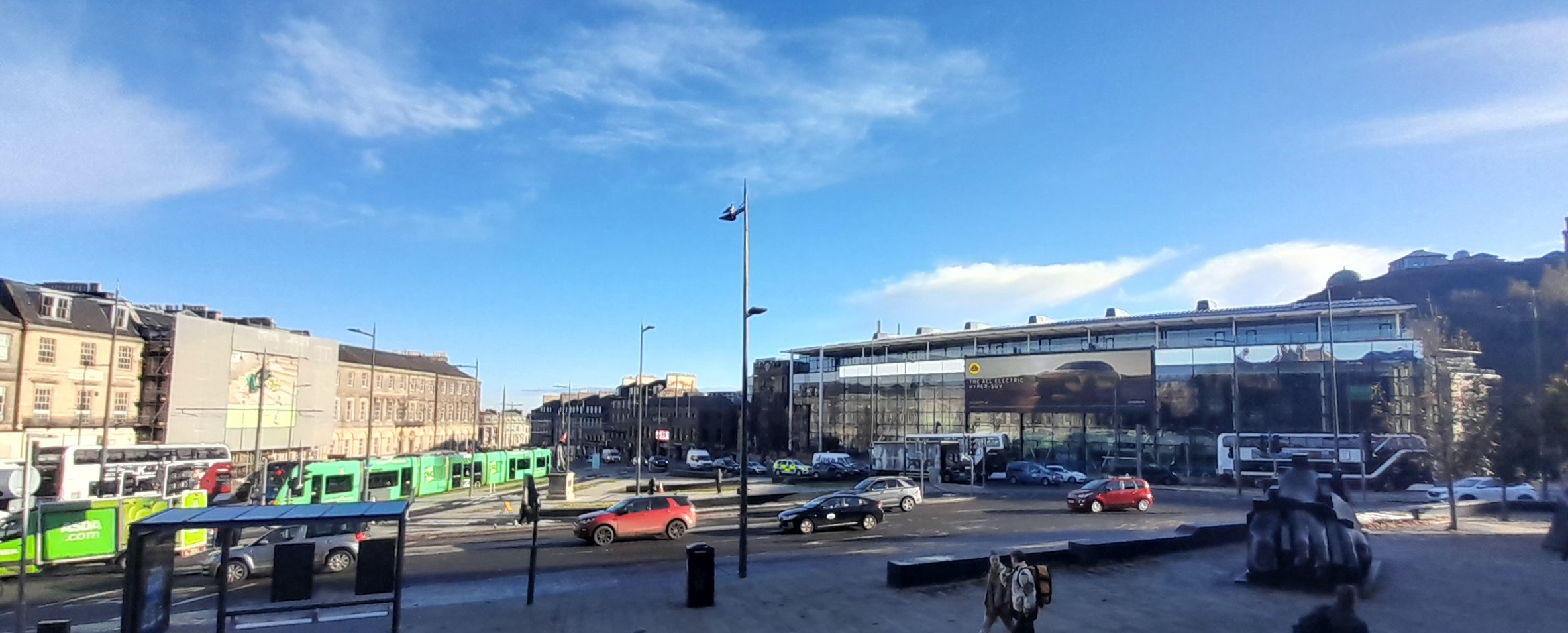
Greenside from St Mary's Cathedral

== History ==
The deep natural hollow west of Calton Hill formed a natural amphitheatre and was historically used for viewing jousting matches and theatre, and is said to be the site of the first Edinburgh showing of the play A Satire of the Three Estates in 1554.

The first substantial structure in the area was the Rude Chapel of 1456 which was incorporated into a Carmelite Monastery built in 1526 at the north end of the hollow, roughly where Blenheim Place now stands (the north end of Greenside Row). In October 1589 the burgh council sent their representatives Alexander Oustean and Richard Doby to meet the builders of a new hospital for lepers at the Chapel of the Rude, to design or set out the bounds of the site and building, the hospital was completed in 1591. A water pump survived until the 1950s on the site of the monastery's Rude Well.

The area was generally undeveloped until 1800, but was then developed as high and dense tenements. The Leith Street section linked to Princes Street to the south-west and Baxters Place linked to Leith Walk. The low level street was originally called Nottingham Terrace later Nottingham Place and was feued in 1839.

This ended with the demolition of 90% of the tenements in the 1970s as part of the Abercrombie Plan for Edinburgh. This conceived a large roundabout (built) connecting over a bridge at Greenside, through a tunnel through Calton Hill to a motorway standard road on the line of St Mary Street (all unbuilt). The building of the roundabout necessitated loss of an entire city block on the south side of Picardy Place, including Arthur Conan Doyle's house.

After the Abercrombie Plan was abandoned the cleared Greenside site was initially proposed as a site for BBC Scotland. An office development began construction in the 1980s but was abandoned after construction of only the underground multi-storey car park. The incomplete structure stood for 15 years before recommencing as a smaller office scheme and the Omni Centre - an entertainment complex. The Omni Centre presents a largely glass curtain wall to the street and was completed in 2002.

=== Kinetic sculpture ===
In 1973, a sculpture was erected in the empty central area of the large roundabout. The structure cost £11000 (around £70,000 in 2021 terms) and was designed by Roger Dainton. It comprised a series of scaffold poles assembled on a triangular plan and rising to around 15m in height. The kinetic element related to an anenometer at the apex which linked to 96 fluorescent light tubes on the scaffolding to create a moving light show. However, apart from the first day this was never operated. This was partly due to running costs but more to do with the very rapid deterioration of the tubes, which were not really intended for outdoor use. A brief restoration took place in 1983. It was removed in 1988 mainly due to the reconfiguration of the roundabout to a smaller size. The sculpture was scrapped to incorporate service lanes and parking areas on three sides but only the north side was completed as per plan.

=== Bridge to Nowhere ===
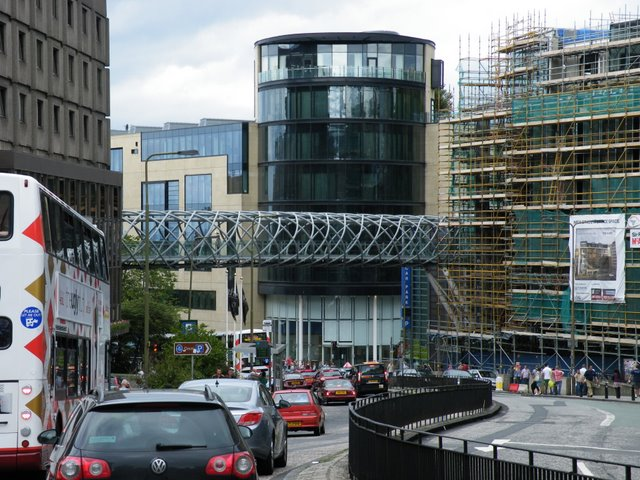
The Bridge to Nowhere in 2009

From 1970 to 2019 a high level pedestrian bridge existed over Leith Street. Although downgraded over time, somewhat misunderstood, and eventually removed, it was not a bridge to nowhere.

The original concept linked to the Abercrombie Plan which foresaw a six lane road on the line of Leith Street and this was too dangerous for pedestrians to cross at road level. A high level pedestrian crossing was proposed. This linked at ground floor to the old St James Shopping Centre but due to dropping ground levels was high in relation to Leith Street. The original bridge discharged at high level on its east side, easing access to Calton Hill.

Around 1995 the bridge was revamped to join to an intended temporary tower on its east side, which had lift access to the underground car park and steps down to Leith Street. The link to Calton Hill was removed and the bridge itself redesigned with a serpentine rather than straight form.

Although the bridge was removed during the St James Quarter redevelopment, the tower on the east side of Leith Street still survives and includes the steps which now indeed go to nowhere.

== Greenside Parish Church ==
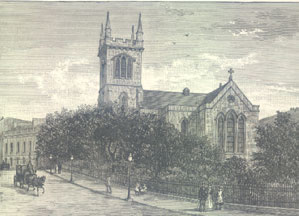

Originally part of the parish of St Cuthbert's (which covered Edinburgh's outlying areas) it was formally made a parish in 1836.

The church lies on the northern approach to Calton Hill between Blenheim Place and Royal Terrace. It was designed by James Gillespie Graham in 1830 and took nine years to complete, opening on 6 October 1839. The church was supportive of missionary work. David Clement Scott and later his brother went to lead the mission at Blantyre in 1881. Six years later, the three Beck sisters decided to send one of them to Blantyre. Janet S. Beck served there for nearly thirty years supported by her sisters.

The church closed in 2024 following a merger with nearby congregations. In August 2026, the building was offered for sale at offers over £1,075,000.

=== Ministers ===
- 1839 to 1871 - William Glover DD (1801–1871)
- 1871 to 1880 - Archibald Scott
- 1880 to 1884 - John Milne
- 1884 to 1887 - John Rudge Wilson
- 1887 to 1898 - John Patrick
- 1899 to ? - Jon Lamond (born 1855)
- 1981 to 2011 - Andrew Anderson
- 2011 onwards, no fixed minister

== Picardy Place ==
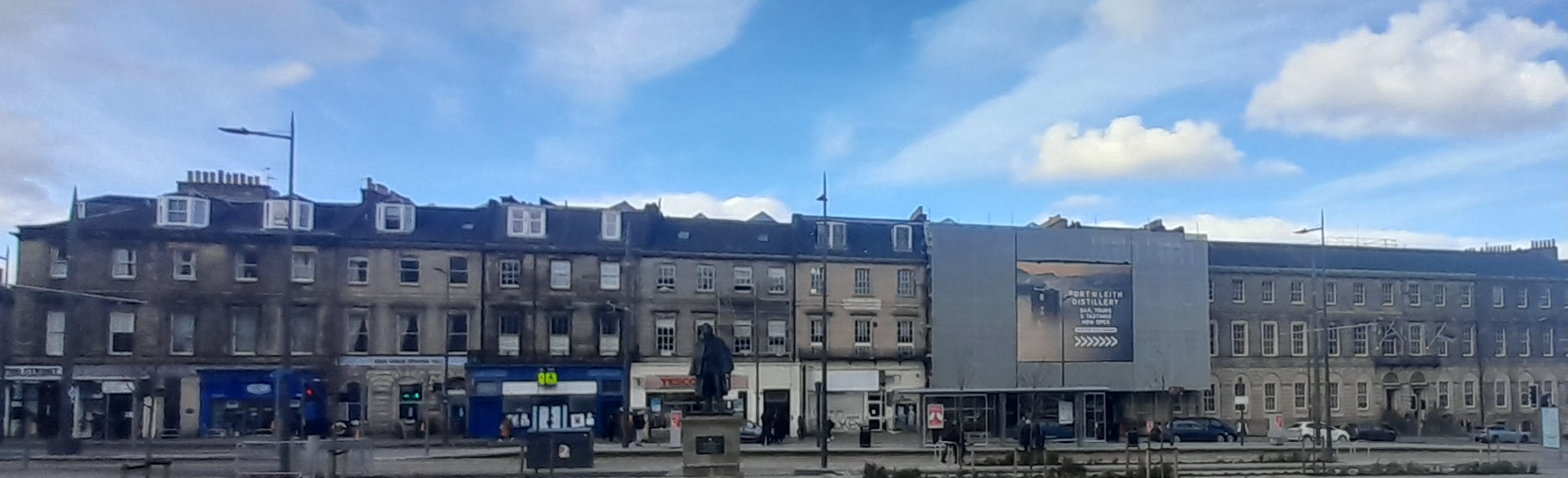
Picardy Place, Edinburgh

The tiny hamlet of Picardy is said to have begun in 1730 when the city magistrates brought in a group of refugee silk-weavers from Picardy in northern France. The city reacquired the land in 1800 for a formal extension of York Place to the west.

The early 19th century south side of the street was demolished in 1969 to create the Picardy Place Roundabout, including demolition of Conan Doyle's home, 11 Picardy Place.

The surviving north side was designed by Robert Burn. The palace-fronted block has lost much of its original symmetry, especially with numerous ground floor alterations. The east side was "restored" around 1980 as a tax office, recreating the ground floor and basement but removing most of the chimneys. This section was converted into a Holiday Inn hotel around 2010. It was sold to International Hotel Properties in 2017 for £18 million.

A new landscaped island with improved pedestrian and cycle links to the surrounding area was completed in September 2023. Besides providing much improved public realm, the purpose of the £2.7 million redesign is safer crossing which has been problematic previously due to several busy junctions. Trees and other greenery were added in November 2023.

== Baxters Place ==
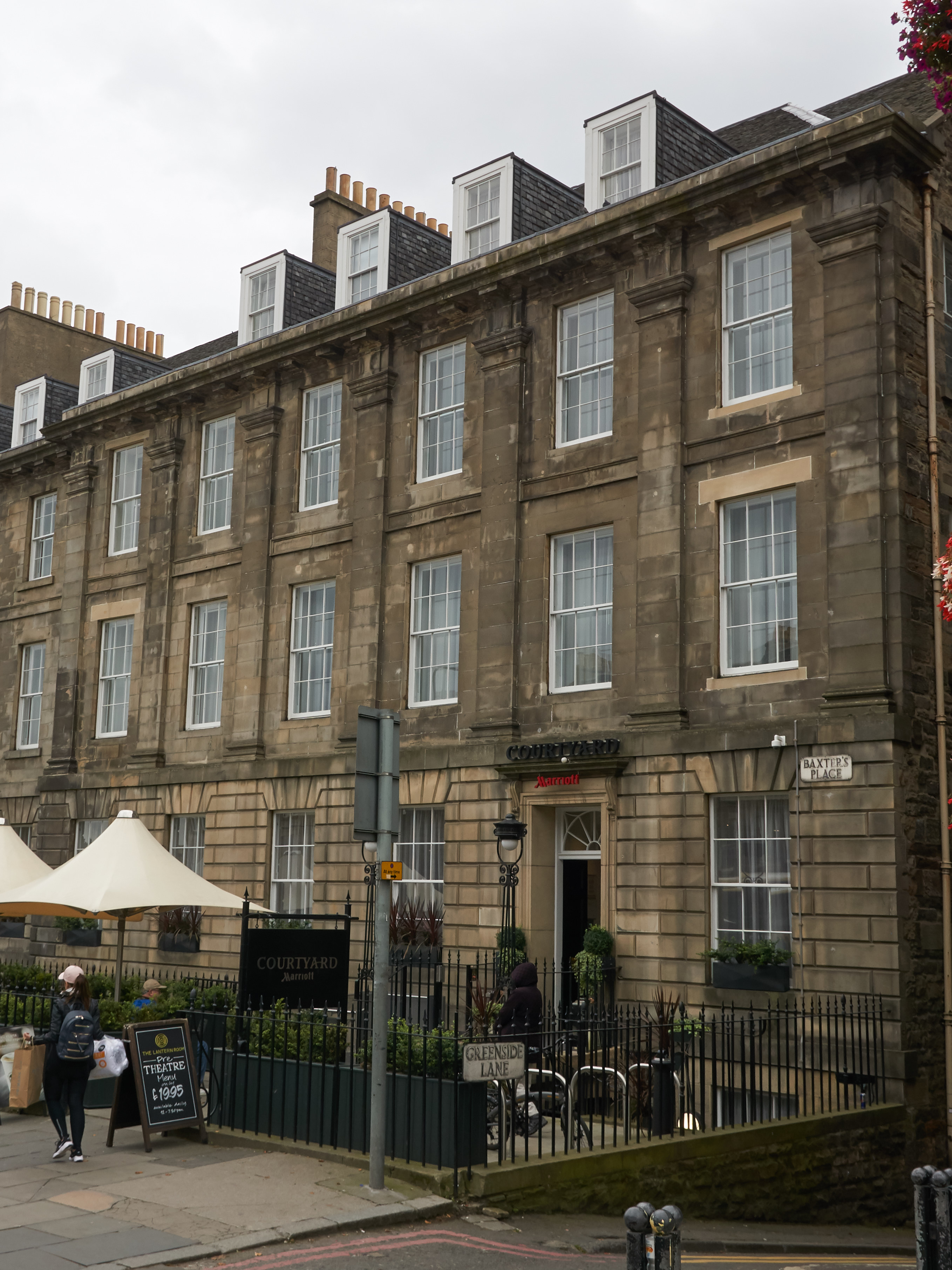
Courtyard Marriot Hotel

Baxters Place is a Georgian terraced row 30m to the north of the Edinburgh Playhouse. Designed by architect John Baxter and built before the turn of the 19th century, the row originally consisted of eight townhouses.

One of the first residents to move in was businessman and engineer Thomas Smith, step-father of the renowned lighthouse engineer Robert Stevenson who himself would inherit the property in 1815. His three sons were born there and all followed their father as lighthouse engineers. One of the sons, Thomas, was the father of the novelist Robert Louis Stevenson.

In the early 20th century part of the building was extended to the rear and turned into a cinema called The Salon. It closed in 1974 and the rear extension demolished.

Much of the building lay derelict until planning permission was granted for three of the townhouses to be redeveloped, and later in 2013 for an extensive new build to the rear, into a new 240 bedroom luxury hotel. The hotel opened in 2017 under Marriot International's Courtyard brand.

== Public Art ==
=== The Holmes statue ===
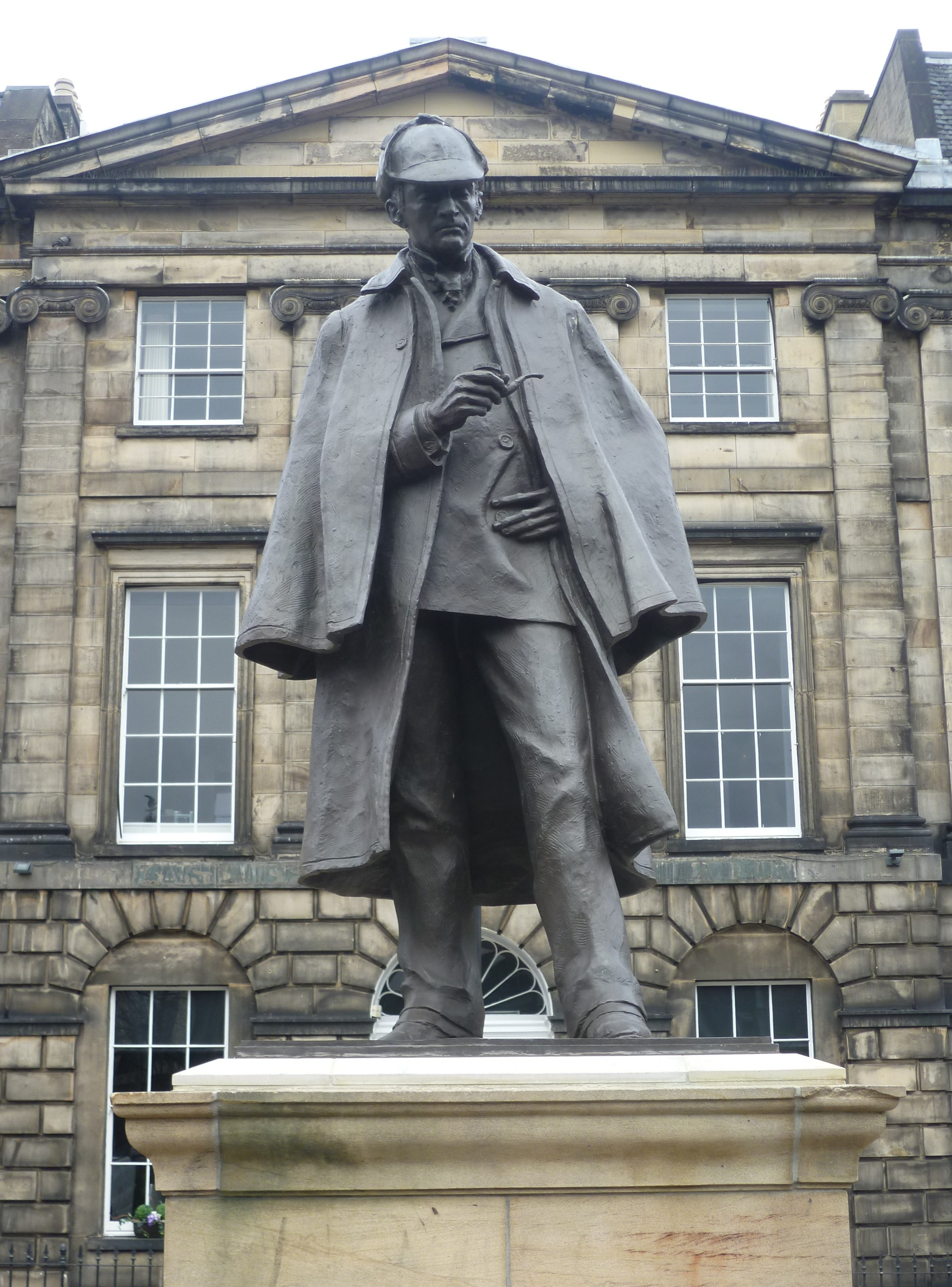
The Holmes Statue at its original location on Picardy Place in 2013

The north access section on Picardy Place was home to a statue of Sherlock Holmes, sculpted by Gerald Ogilvie-Laing, in tribute to the character's creator Arthur Conan Doyle.

It was removed in 2018 to make way for construction of the Edinburgh Trams line extension, which required the complete demolition of the north section access and parking area.

During September 2023, the statue was reinstated as part of a new public realm closer to the site of the author's home.

=== Paolozzi sculpture ===
A new access way, albeit a somewhat diluted version of that laid out in the 1988 plan, was built on the west side next to St Mary's RC Cathedral.

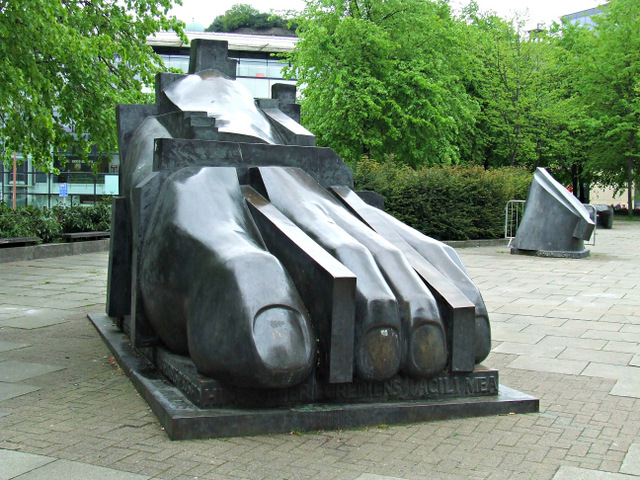
The Foot, with The Ankle in the background

Instead of the proposed car parking, a large three-part sculpture The Manuscript of Monte Cassino created by Leith-born artist Eduardo Paolozzi was installed. The three parts consist of a disembodied foot, hand and ankle. The artwork was gifted by Sir Tom Farmer in 1991.

=== Dreaming Spires ===
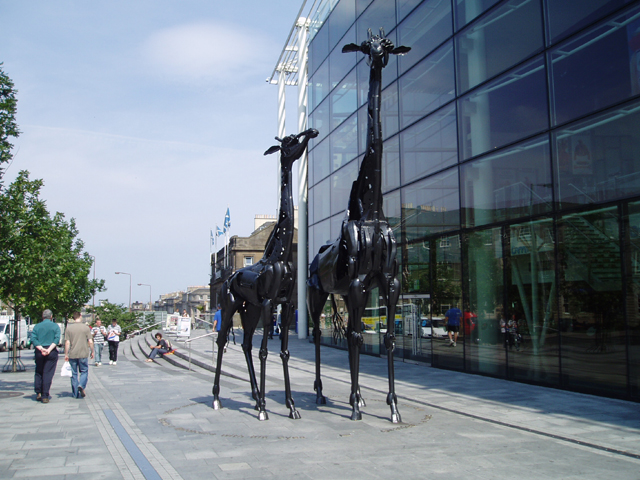
The Dreaming Spires sculpture.

The south-east side of the 1988 plan was never built. The area now forms the extended pavement in front of the Omni Centre which in 2004 held a contest for a public artwork to be designed.

Artist Helen Denerley's scrap metal sculpture of two giraffes, an adult and calf, was completed in June 2005. Helen nicknamed the giraffes 'Martha' and 'Gilbert'.

At their feet, there is an encircling bronze inscription quoting the 1946 poem Dreaming Spires by Roy Campbell, from where the sculpture takes its name.

== Transport ==
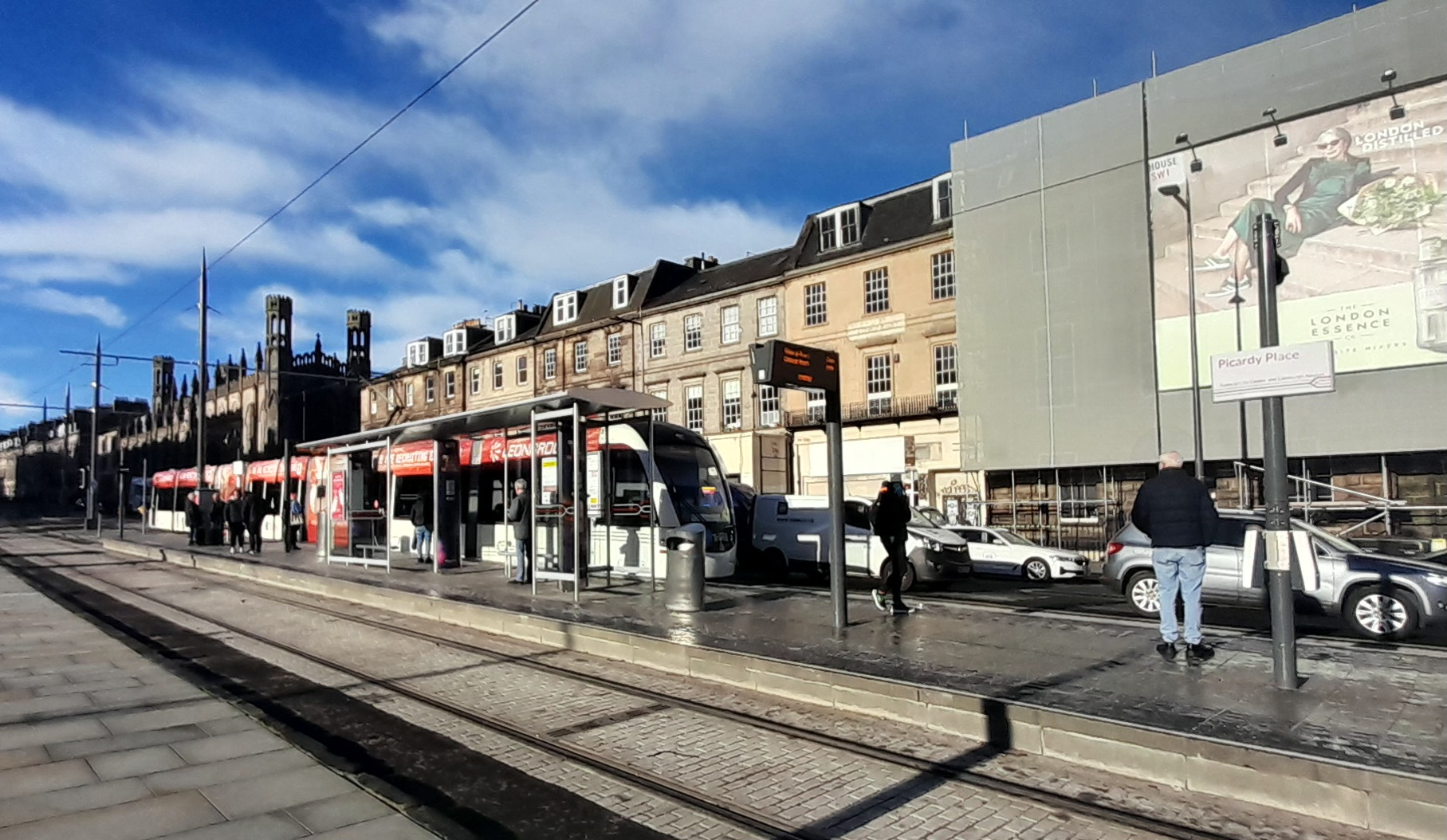
Picardy Place tram stop

=== Buses ===
Greenside is served by bus stops on Leith Street and Elm Row, and also on nearby York Place

=== Trams ===
Picardy Place tram stop is located at the north of the new Picardy Place island.

Preceding station	Edinburgh Trams	Following station
McDonald Road towards Newhaven	Newhaven – Edinburgh Airport	St Andrew Square towards Airport

The stop opened to passengers in June 2023 after completion of the Newhaven line extension replacing the temporary stop at York Place, which had served as the eastern terminus from 2014 until its removal in 2022.

=== Rail ===
The Calton Road entrance to Waverley Station is 400m south of the Picardy Place tram stop. Lift access is available.

== Buildings of Note ==
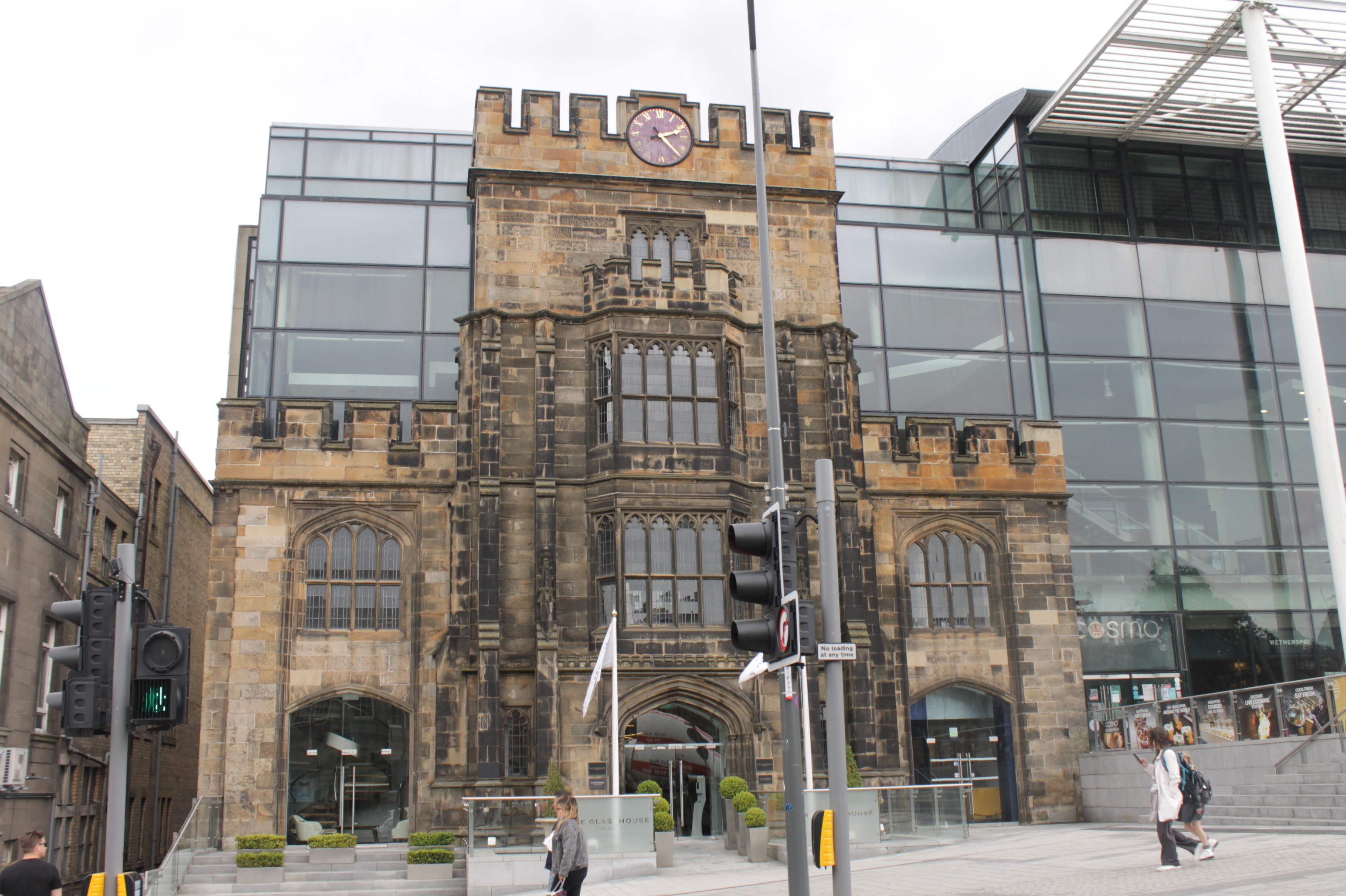
Facade of Lady Glenorchy's Free Church.

- Greenside Parish Church (1830) by James Gillespie Graham
- Lady Glenorchy's Free Church (1846) by John Henderson (architect) facade only remains - now in hotel use
- Edinburgh Playhouse (1929) by John Fairweather
- Omni Centre (2002) by Allan Murray Architects

== Notable residents ==
- Arthur Conan Doyle
- John Alexander Ford
- Thomas Smith
- Robert Stevenson
