= Thomas Snell Jones =

English Presbyterian minister (1754–1837)

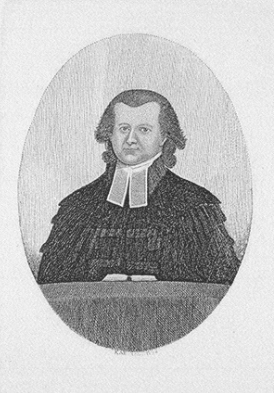
Rev Thomas Snell Jones

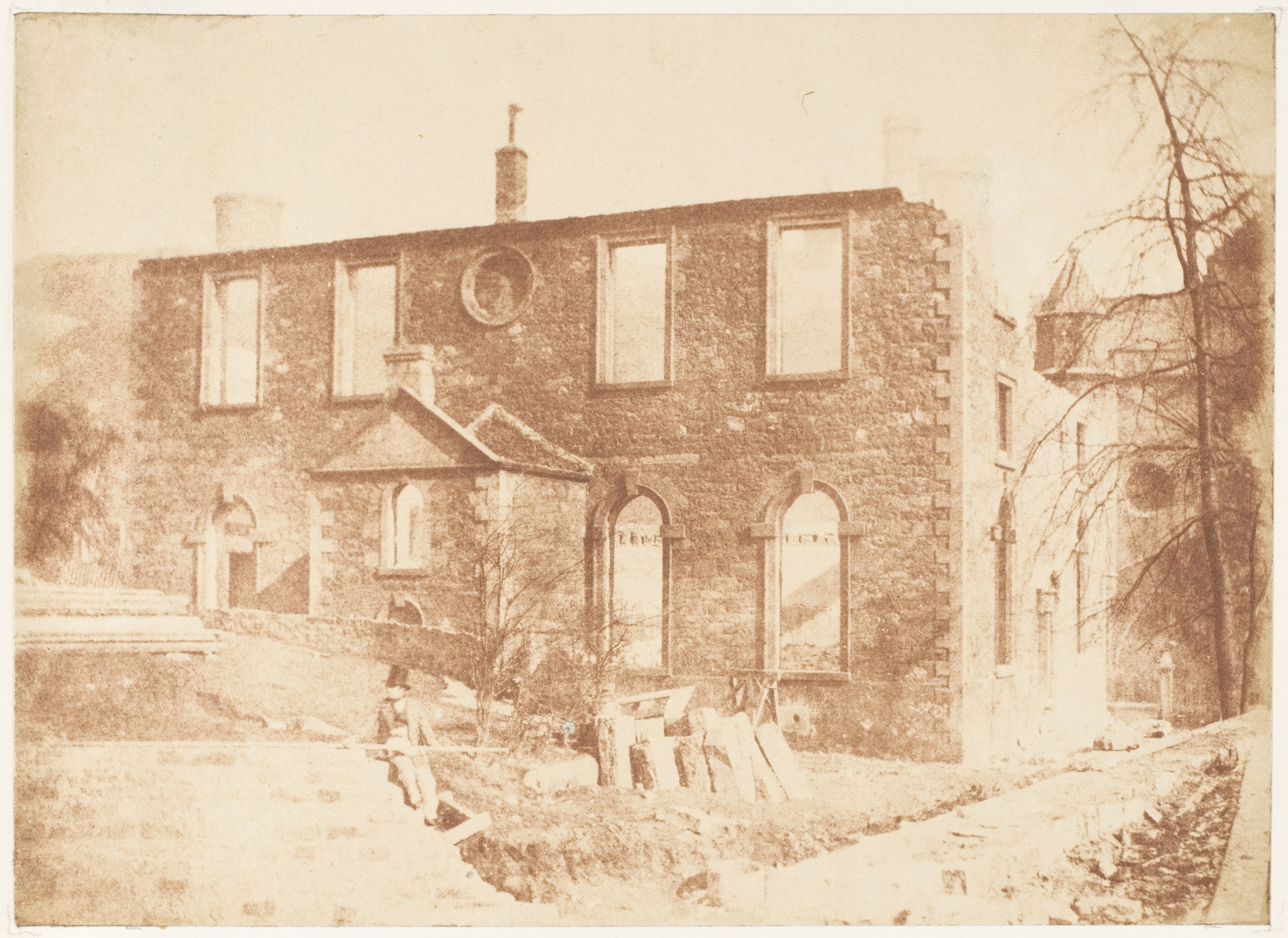
Lady Glenorchy's Church from west (during demolition in 1846/7)

Thomas Snell Jones (1754–1837) was a senior English-born Presbyterian minister operational in Scotland outside the Church of Scotland.

== Life ==
He was born in Gloucester on 11 May 1754. He was orphaned at an early age and cared for by a Wesleyan Methodist who encouraged him to train as a minister.

He was sent to the Nonconformist Academy in Trevecca in Wales under the patronage of the Countess of Huntingdon for four years. Here he trained alongside Harry Trelawny, who became a friend, and in the next few years they would share some preaching tasks. In 1776 he then went to Plymouth Dock to assist Rev Mr Kinsman, an elderly clergyman. In June 1779 he was licensed to preach by the Scots Prebytery in London in response to a request from Lady Glenorchy to preach as minister of her own endowment to Edinburgh: Lady Glenorchy's Church which had recently been built, in a Wesleyan fashion, and had lost its first minister unexpectedly. It was critical that the minister of this new church was English, as the General assembly had initially banned Church of Scotland ministers from holding the position.

He arrived in Edinburgh in the spring of 1779 and after a few tests before the congregation, he was accepted in this new role on 25 July 1779 aged only 25, and remained in his post for 58 years.

In 1786, Jones oversaw the funeral of his patron, Lady Glenorchy, and conducted the ceremony ending in her burial within a small vault under the centre of the church floor.

Only from 1794 does he appear in street directories: living at 55 Hanover Street, a then-new building in Edinburgh's First New Town.

In October 1794, the final declaration and confession of Robert Watt, prior to his execution for treason at the gallows at the Old Tolbooth was attested by Jones and Dr George Baird.

Aberdeen University awarded him an honorary Doctor of Divinity in 1810 at the suggestion of his friend William Laurence Brown.

On 8 June 1828, there was a celebration of his 50th year as minister of Glenorchy. This was held at the Waterloo Tavern and 100 persons were present including the Lord Provost, Walter Brown, and Rev Dr Gordon of St Giles. The event was organised by John Bonar of Ratho and J. F. MacFarlan.

From 1834 he went into semi-retirement, passing most of his work to Rev Thomas Liddell who had assisted him since 1831.

He lived his final years still at 55 Hanover Street.

He died on 3 March 1837 aged 82. His burial place is unknown but is probably in either New or Old Calton Burial Ground, neither of which connect to a Church of Scotland church, and both of which lie very close.

== Family ==
Around 1778 he married Elizabeth Payton (d. 1780) by whom he had one daughter, Elizabeth Payton Jones (d. 1848).

Around 1781 he married Mary Belshes (1751–1786) who also died young.

Around 1789 he thirdly married Anne Gardner (1752–1822) with whom he had several children: Anne Jones (1790–1885); John Jones (1792–1861; and Thomas Jones (1793–1868) who became a banker in Leith.

== Publications ==
- Mankind Accountable Creatures (1786)
- A Sermon on the Death of Lady Glenorchy (1788)
- Sermons (1816)
- Address delivered at the Baptism of Joseph Davis, a Converted Jew (1820) (note: Joseph was a Polish-born spirit dealer at 10 South St Andrew St)
- The Life of Willielma, Viscountess Glenorchy (1822)
