= James Bonar (scholar) =

Scottish lawyer and amateur astronomer (1757-1821)

James Bonar FRSE (1757–1821) was a Scottish lawyer and amateur astronomer. He served as Solicitor of Excise in Scotland, and was known as a scholar and supporter of learned societies.

== Life ==
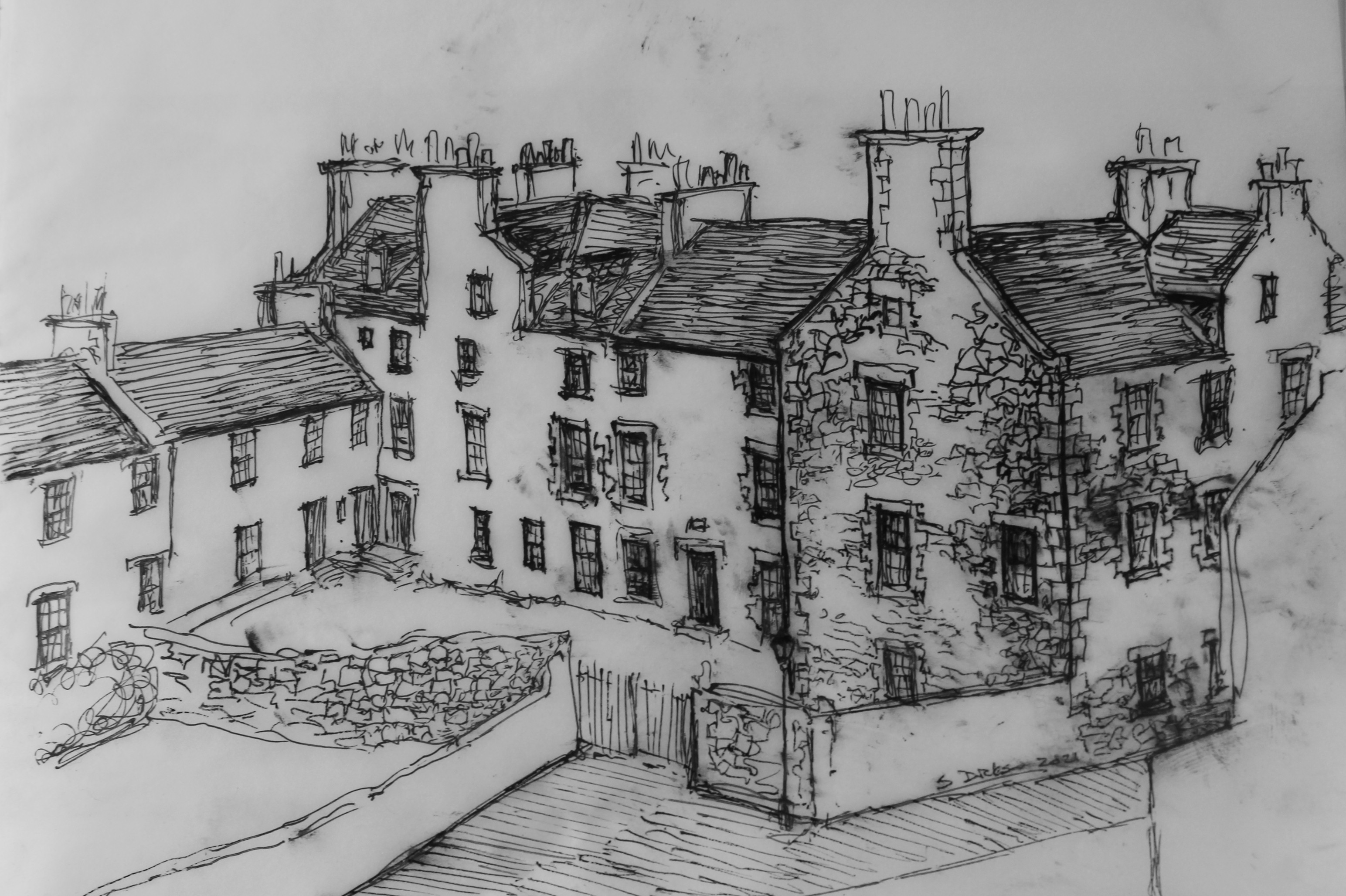
Paterson's Court, Broughton, Edinburgh c. 1850

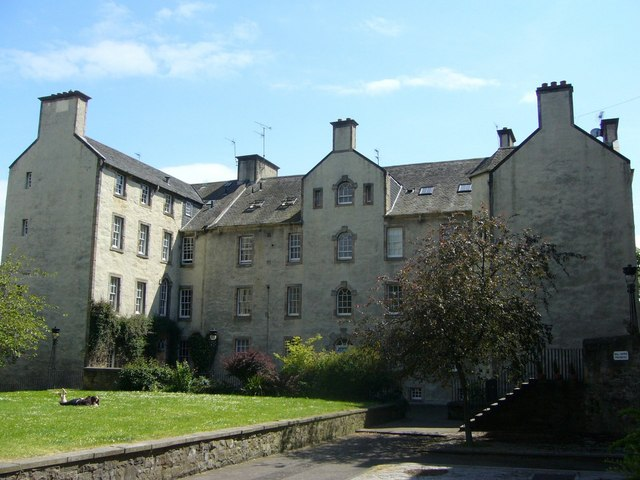
Chessel's Court, Canongate

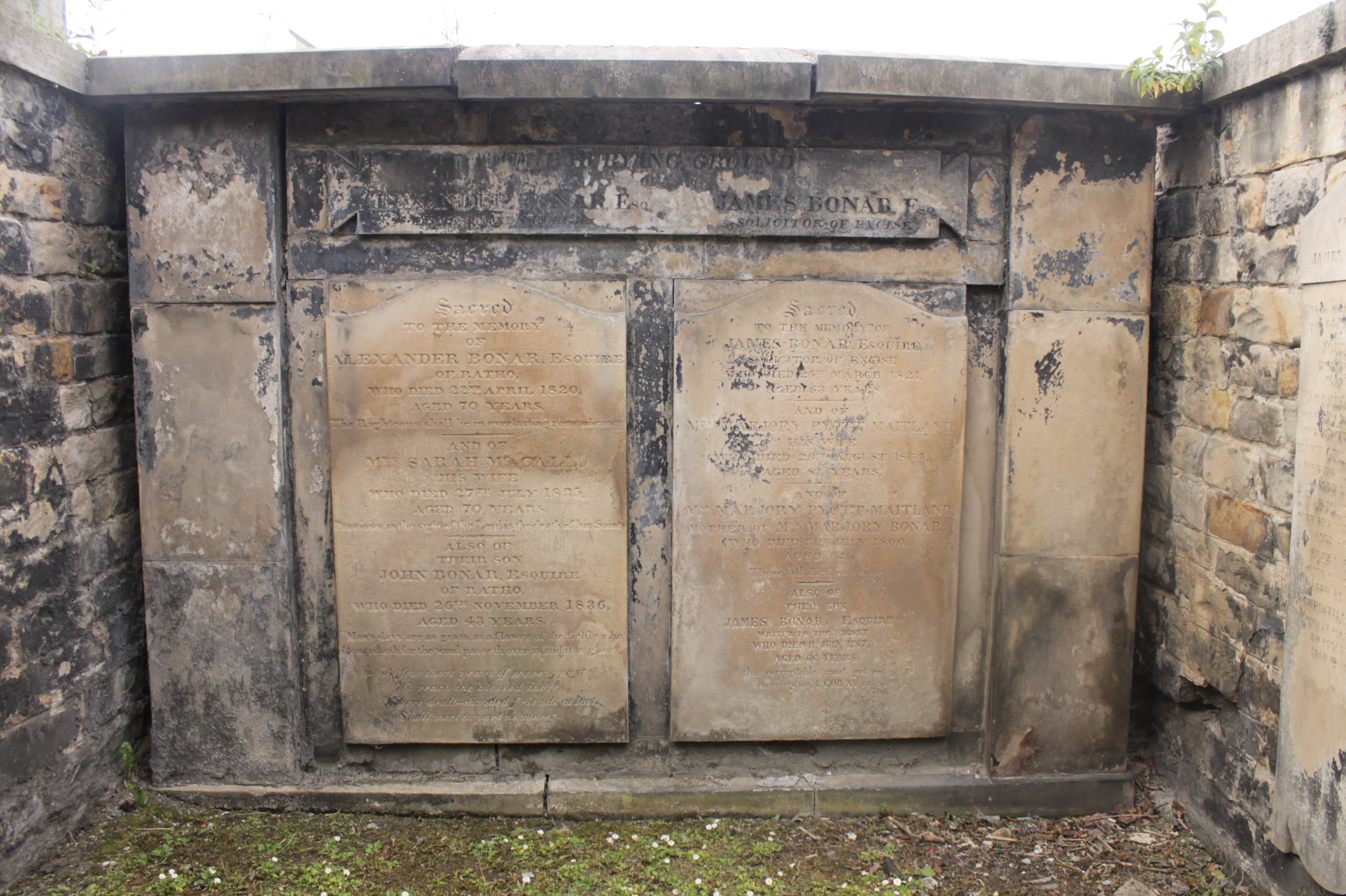
The grave of James Bonar, Canongate Kirkyard

The eighth son of John Bonar (1722–1761), previously minister at Cockpen, Midlothian but in 1757 minister of West Church Perth, and his wife, Christian Currier (d.1771), he was born on 29 September 1757. He was educated at the High School, Edinburgh, and attended Edinburgh University.

Bonar early entered the excise office, but became noted as a scholar. He was a member of the Speculative Society of Edinburgh University, admitted 9 December 1777, and elected an extraordinary member on 24 December 1781, and was for several years treasurer of the Royal Society of Edinburgh. He was one of the original promoters of the Astronomical Institution, and one of the founders of the Edinburgh Subscription Library in 1794.

In March 1788 it was Bonar who discovered Deacon Brodie robbing the excise office where he worked, at Chessel's Court on the Canongate (still extant).

From 1800 he was living at Paterson's Court in the Broughton district of Edinburgh. Paterson's Court lay next to Broughton market at the west end of what is now Barony Street.

In 1798 he was elected a Fellow of the Royal Society of Edinburgh and served as its treasurer from 1798 to 1821.

Bonar died in his house in Broughton on 25 March 1821. He is buried in Canongate Kirkyard on the Royal Mile in Edinburgh. The grave lies in the north-west corner of the eastern extension. Most of his children and grandchildren lie nearby.

== Works ==
Bonar was author of the article on "Posts" in the Encyclopædia Britannica of 1794, and the articles on "Alphabet Characters", "Etymology", "Excise", "Hieroglyphics", &c., in the Edinburgh Encyclopædia 1808–18. He wrote also ‘Disquisition on the Origin and Radical Sense of the Greek Prepositions,’ 1804.

Bonar edited the new edition of Ewing's Greek Grammar, and contributed articles to the Edinburgh Magazine, Missionary Magazine, and Scottish Register, 1790–5. He published an English edition of Holbein's Dance of Death, 1788, and wrote the memoir of his brother Archibald Bonar in the second volume of his sermons.

== Family ==
In March 1797 he married Marjory Pyott Maitland and they had five sons and three daughters.

His sons included James Bonar, Horatius Bonar and Andrew Bonar all leading figures in the Free Church of Scotland.
