= Omni Centre, Edinburgh =

Entertainment complex in Scotland

Omni Centre
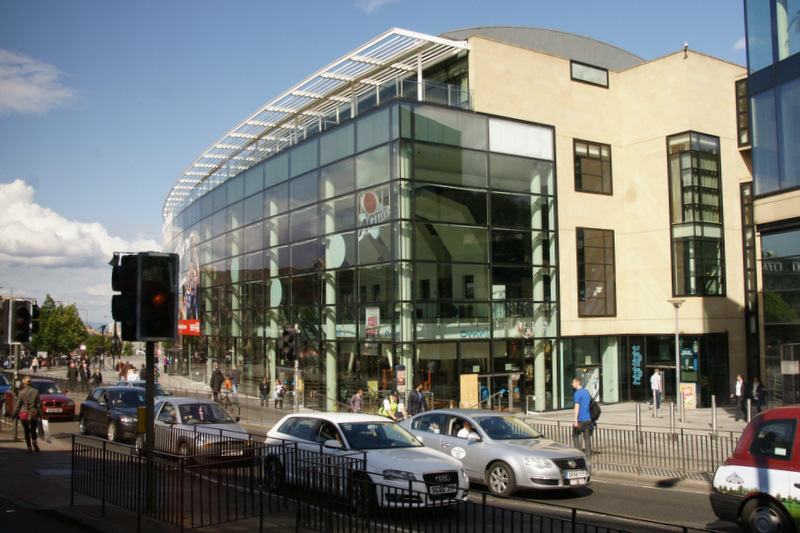
- Omni Centre, in 2011
- Location: Edinburgh, Scotland, UK
- Coordinates: 55°57′22.18″N 3°11′7.94″W
- Address: Greenside Row; Edinburgh; EH1 3AA
- Opened: 2002
- Developer: Pillar Projects, Parlison Properties Ltd
- Owner: Triple B
- Architect: Allan Murray Architects
- Num. of anchor tenants: 1 (Vue)
- Floors: 10 (including 3 sub levels). 1 floor is used for retail space while 2 are used for the cinema.
- Parking: 990
- Public transit: Edinburgh Waverley; Picardy Place
- Website: omniedinburgh.co.uk

The Omni Centre is an entertainment and leisure complex in Greenside, Edinburgh. It attracts over 4 million visitors a year, and was acquired in April 2024 from previous owners Nuveen by Triple B.

== Overview ==
The Omni was built on a steeply sloping site at Greenside Row, part of Edinburgh's New Town, on the location of a former church that was closed in 1978. It opened in 2002 creating a modern glass curtain wall, incorporating parts of the facade of the now demolished church. It is a five-minute walk from both Edinburgh Waverley railway station and Edinburgh Bus Station. Picardy Place tram stop is just across the road from the main entrance, with several connecting bus stops close by. The Centre is close by St James Quarter.

The complex is anchored by a 12-screen Vue cinema, a health and fitness club, a luxury five-star hotel (The Glasshouse Hotel) and has a multi-level underground car park. The complex has several bars and restaurants, including JD Wetherspoon, Nando's and a street food market. Outside the centre are two large scrap metal giraffe sculptures called Dreaming Spires, made by artist Helen Denerley as a result of a contest held by the Centre and installed in 2005.

In 2023 it was one of two main venues for the Edinburgh International Film Festival.

== Edinburgh Street Food ==
Edinburgh Street Food is a year-round, covered street food market in central Edinburgh, Scotland. It was opened in February 2023 inside the Omni Centre on Leith Street.
