= Drumblade =

Hamlet in Aberdeenshire, Scotland

Coordinates: 57.4508°N 2.6914°W

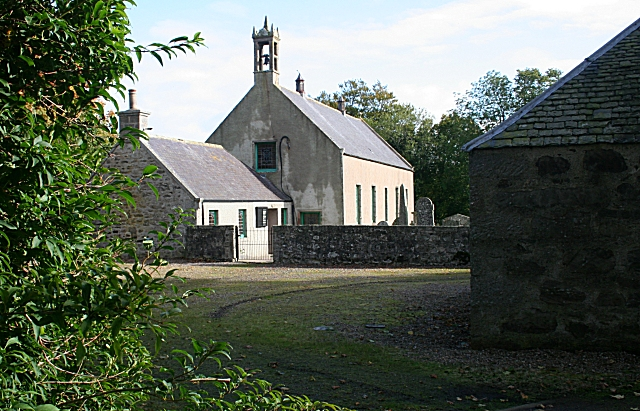
Drumblade church in 2008

Drumblade is a hamlet in north-western Aberdeenshire, Scotland, which lies 4¾ miles east of the town of Huntly.

== Schools ==
Drumblade Primary School is a primary school with a nursery unit, and a total roll of 53 as of 2013. It is a feeder school for The Gordon Schools, Huntly. It made the national news in 2012 when its pet ducks disappeared, presumed stolen.

== History ==
Drumblade Stone Circle, or Ston(e)yfield, is the remains of an ancient stone circle. It is about 6 kilometres (3.7 mi) east of Huntly.

Drumblade is the site of the Battle of Slioch in December 1307, involving Robert the Bruce.

== Notable residents ==
- William Garden Blaikie minister, later Free Church moderator
- George Ramsay Davidson minister of Drumblade from 1828 to 1842
