= Allan Murray Architects =

AMA Studio (formerly Allan Murray Architects) is an Edinburgh, Scotland based practice of award-winning architects and urbanists. Formed in 1992 (34 years ago), it has a substantial body of work in the Scottish capital.

In recent years the modern nature of some of its designs has attracted criticism as it is not perceived to "fit" with Edinburgh's current architecture. Some commentators, including Magnus Linklater, have questioned whether too many buildings in Edinburgh have been designed by the firm.

In April 2020, the company became an employee owned trust.

== Awards ==
In 2010, the Hotel Missoni in Edinburgh (now the Radisson Collection Hotel, Royal Mile Edinburgh) designed by the firm was awarded a Special Award for Scotland by the Civic Trust Awards. Hotel Missoni also won an RIBA Award in 2010.

=== Other awards ===
British Construction Industry Awards

- 2003 Winner - Small Projects Category, Cowgate under 5's Centre, Edinburgh

Britannia HomeBuilder Design Awards

- 2002 Winner - Best Apartment Building, Coalhill Urban Development, Leith, Edinburgh

British Council for Offices Awards

- 2003 Winner - Best Commercial Workplace Regional Award, The Tun, Holyrood, Edinburgh
- 2003 Winner - Best Commercial Workplace National Award, The Tun, Holyrood, Edinburgh

EAA Silver Medal

- 2000 Commendation - Best Building, UDV Guinness HQ, Edinburgh Park
- 2002 Winner, Cowgate under 5's Centre, Edinburgh

Prime Minister's Better Public Buildings Award

- 2003 Shortlisted, Cowgate under 5's Centre, Edinburgh

Royal Scottish Academy Gold Medal for Architecture

- 1998 Winner, Hamilton Arts Centre and Library

Scottish Architectural Awards

- 1996 Winner - Best Building, Peterhead Maritime Heritage Museum

Scottish Design Awards

- 2001 Winner - Best Commercial Building, UDV Guinness HQ, Edinburgh Park
- 2003 Commendation – Best Commercial Project, Site A Masterplan, Edinburgh Park

Scottish Property Awards

- 2003 Winner - Commercial Development of the Year, Calton Square, Edinburgh
