= John Burnett Pratt =

Scottish divine and antiquarian

- Born: 1799
- Died: 1869 (aged 69–70)
- Occupation: Antiquarian

John Burnett Pratt (1799–1869) was a Scottish divine and antiquarian.

== Biography ==
Pratt was born in Cairnbanno, New Deer, was son of a working tradesman. After graduating M.A. at Aberdeen University, he took orders in the Scottish episcopal church, and obtained a living at Stuartfield in 1821. In 1825 he was elected to St. James's Church, Cruden, where he remained till his death. He was also examining chaplain to the bishop of Aberdeen and domestic chaplain to the Earl of Erroll. Aberdeen University conferred on him the honorary degree of LL.D. in 1865. He died at Cruden on 20 March 1869.

Besides editing the ‘Scottish Episcopal Communion Service’ in 1866, he was the author of: 1. ‘The Old Paths, where is the Good Way,’ 3rd edit. Oxford, 1840. 2. ‘Buchan,’ 8vo, Aberdeen, 1858; 3rd edit., with a memoir, 1870; this work embodied the results of many years of antiquarian and topographical research in the district. 3. ‘The Druids,’ 8vo, London, 1861. 4. ‘Letters on the Scandinavian Churches, their Doctrine, Worship, and Polity,’ 8vo, London, 1865. 5. ‘Scottish Episcopacy and Scottish Episcopalians. Three Sermons,’ 8vo, Aberdeen, 1838.
