= Crunden =

Crunden is a surname. Notable people with the surname include:

- Frederick M. Crunden (1847–1911), American librarian
- John Crunden (c. 1741–1828), British architectural and furniture designer
- Robert M. Crunden (1940–1999), American historian

== See also ==
- Cruden
