= John Cruden =

John Cruden (1754–1787) was a Scottish merchant and Loyalist leader of the American Revolutionary War.

== Life ==
He was the son of William Cruden. He left Scotland and joined John Cruden & Co., run by his uncle John, in Wilmington, North Carolina, before 1770 when his younger brother James also became a partner in the firm.

In March 1775 Cruden, a Tory, found his business boycotted, and gave it up. He supplied arms to the Loyalists, who were defeated locally at the Battle of Moore's Creek Bridge in February 1776. After that he took refuge in HMS Jenny of the Royal Navy, and sailed in April for Jamaica. He moved on to the Bahamas, where his uncle John Cruden the elder had gone into exile. Then he went in 1777 to New York.

In 1778 Cruden received a commission as lieutenant-colonel from Lord Cornwallis. He became Commissioner for Sequestered Estates under General Henry Clinton, in Charleston which had fallen to the British in 1780. Cruden ran the sequestered estates, for the benefit of the British forces; they had been taken from leading Whigs, such as Ralph Izard, Francis Marion, John Mathews, Arthur Middleton, William Moultrie, Charles Cotesworth Pinckney and John Rutledge. Another plantation owner affected was Henry Laurens, who at this period was held in the Tower of London.

On 5 January 1782, Cruden wrote to John Murray, 4th Earl of Dunmore, urging the recruitment by the British military in South Carolina of a force of 10,000 slaves. In April of that year he was responsible for the British attack on Beaufort, North Carolina. In 1783 he was tracking down black Loyalists who had been sold again into slavery.

Cruden in early 1784 was in Great Britain, and sailed in the spring back to East Florida. He had plans to destabilise the Spanish control of East Florida; these were thwarted by Patrick Tonyn, who gave his backing to Vicente Manuel de Céspedes, the Spanish governor. Still Cruden wrote, assiduously, to Carlos III of Spain, seeking support for the Loyalist exiles, now that the American war was over.

Céspedes gave Cruden support in 1785 to sail for Nova Scotia, still looking for backing for the exiles. Then Cruden moved on to Nassau on New Providence in the Bahamas, where he was in May 1786; his uncle went to Exuma. He made his way to Nova Scotia, to see Colonel Thomas Dundas who dealt with Loyalist claims for compensation, being in Halifax on 30 October 1786.

Cruden then returned to the Bahamas. In poor physical and mental health, he died there on 18 September 1787, aged 33.

== Works ==
- An address to the loyal part of the British Empire, and the friends of monarchy throughout the globe (1785)
