= William Robertson (urban missionary) =

Scottish minister and reformer (1805–1882)

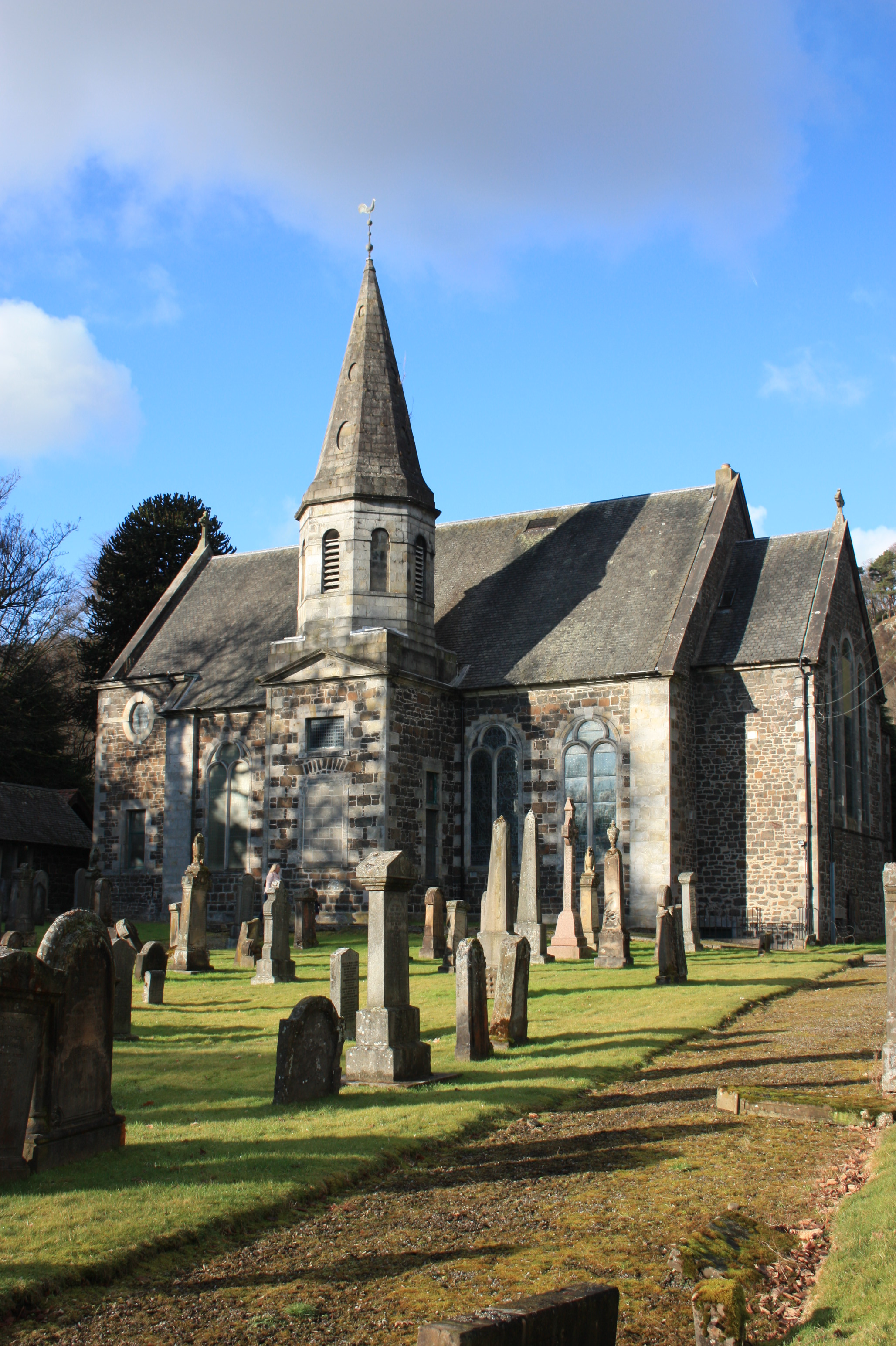
Logie Kirk

William Robertson (1805–1882) was a Scottish minister of the Church of Scotland and a primary promoter of the 19th century concept of ragged schools and urban missions. The Robertson Memorial Mission in Edinburgh's Grassmarket is named after him.

== Life ==
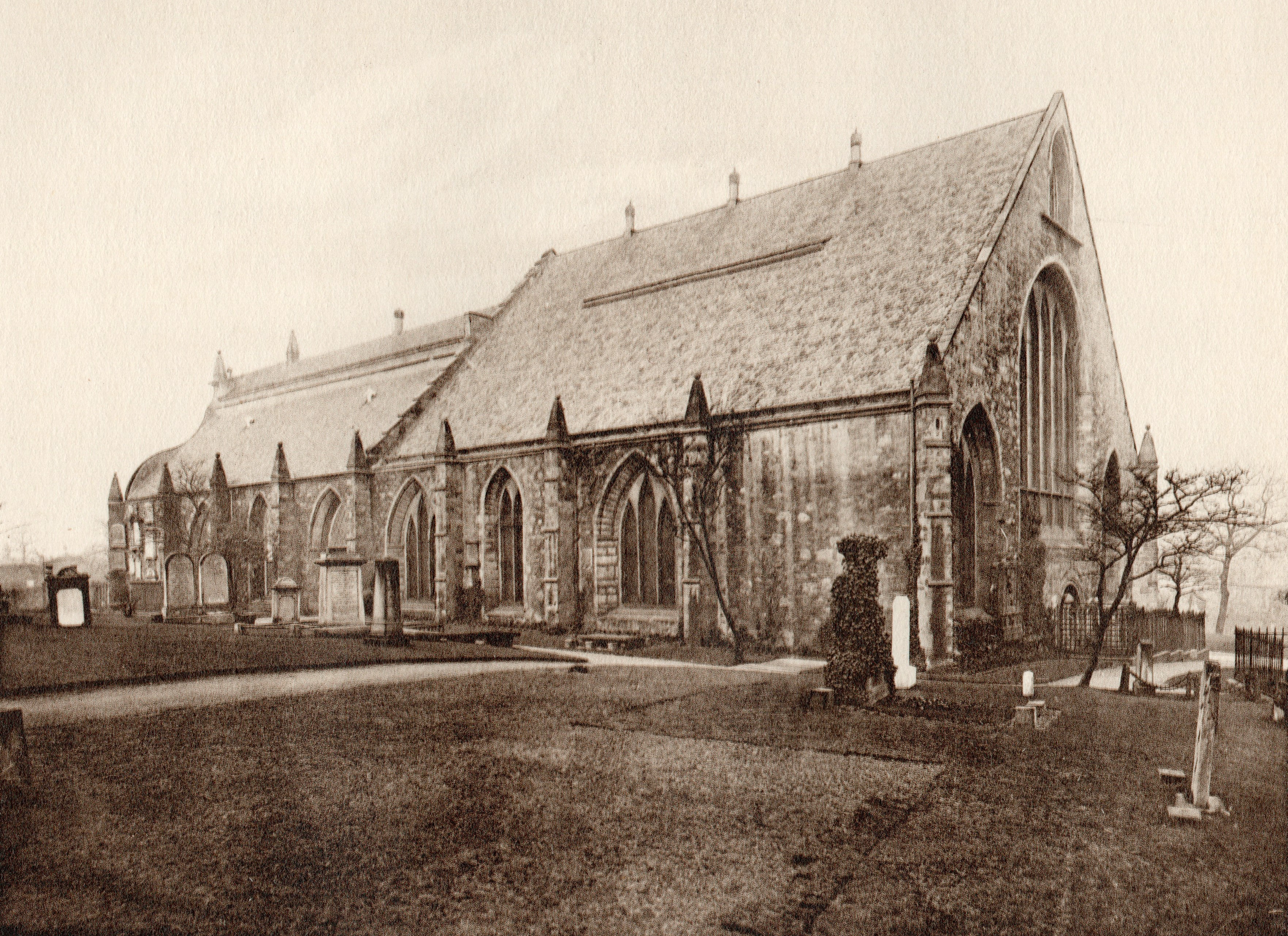
New and Old Greyfriars

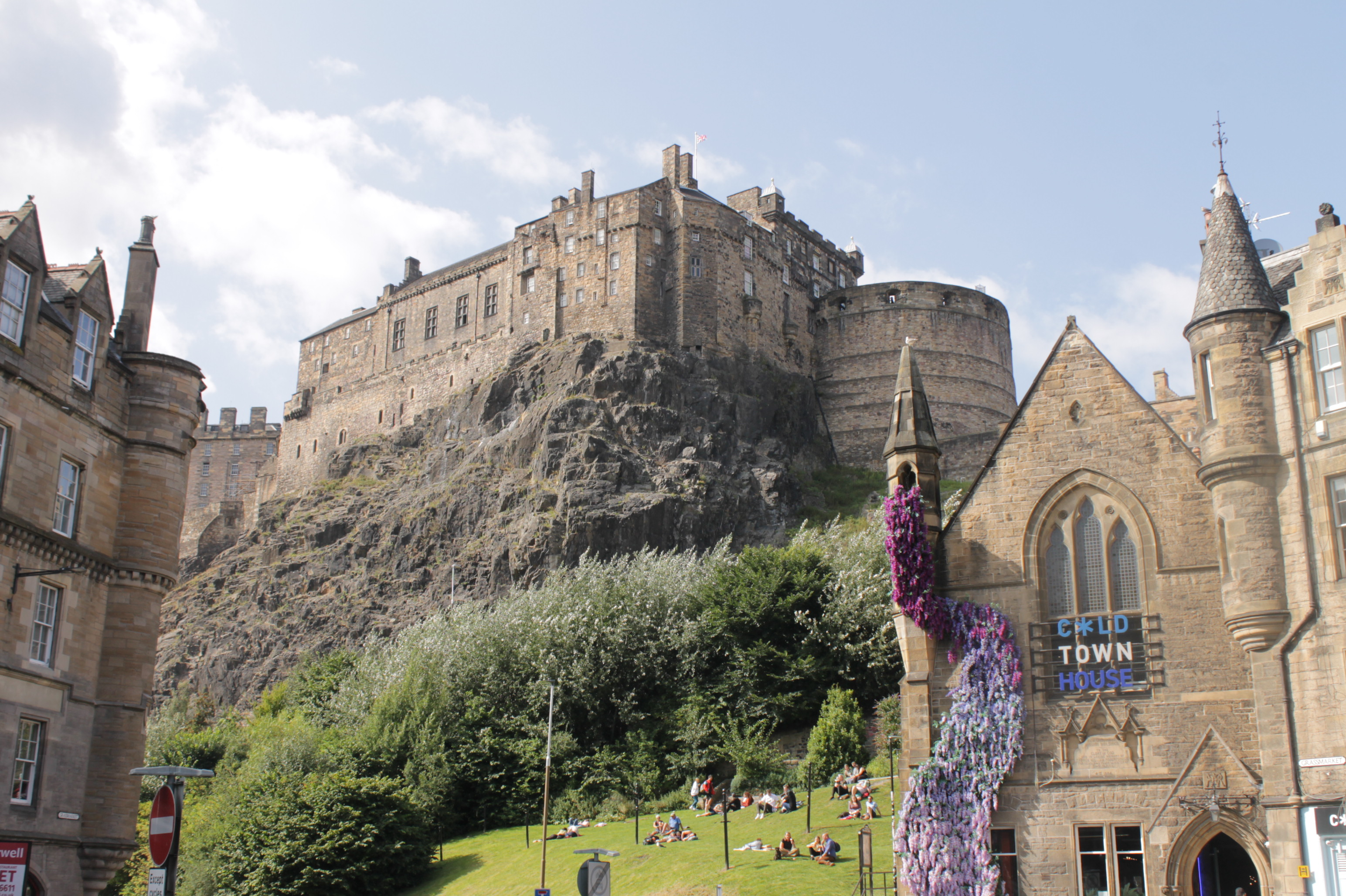
Edinburgh Castle looms over the Robertson Memorial Church (right)

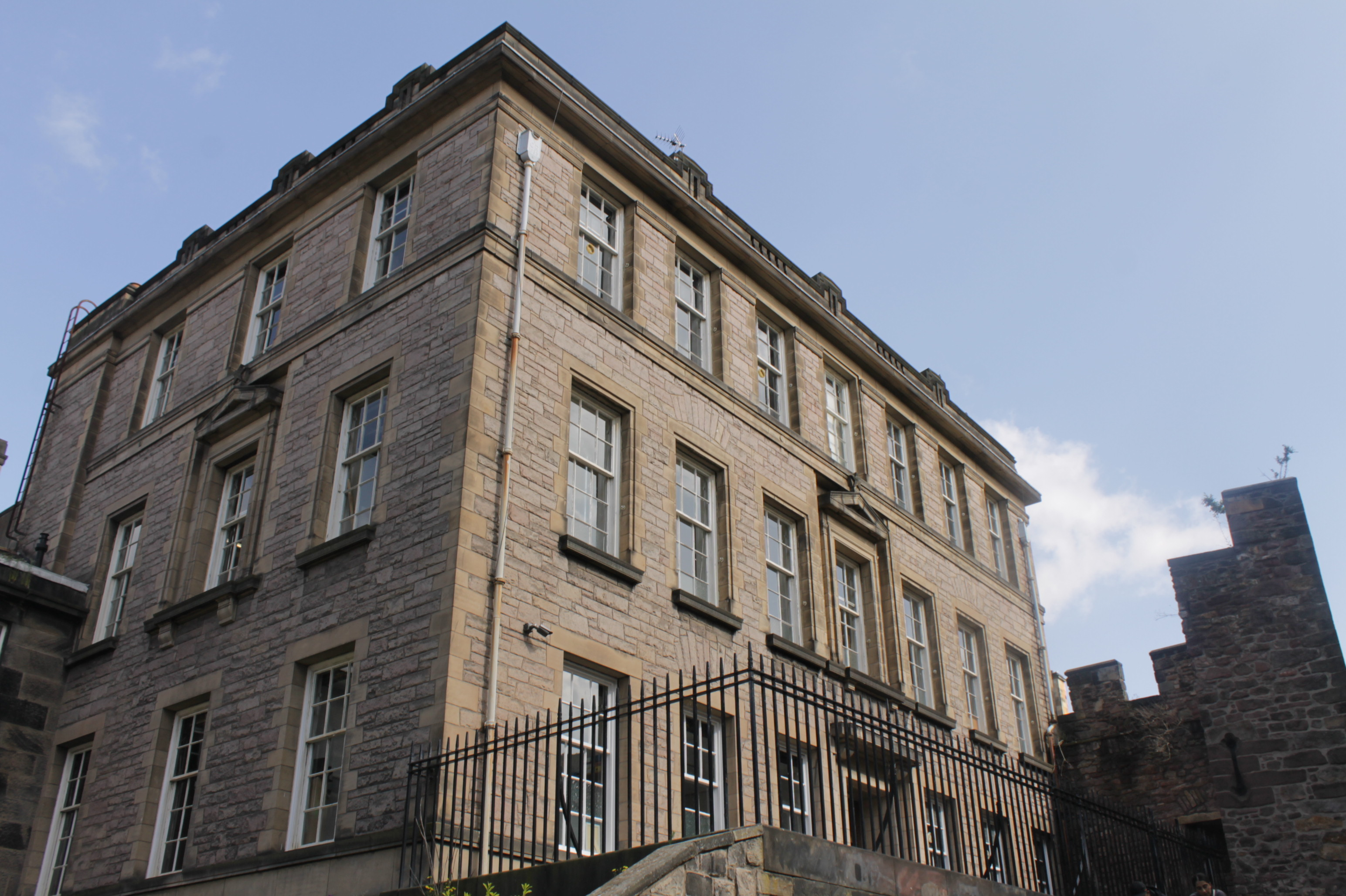
Vennel Ragged School next to the Flodden Wall - now part of George Heriot's School

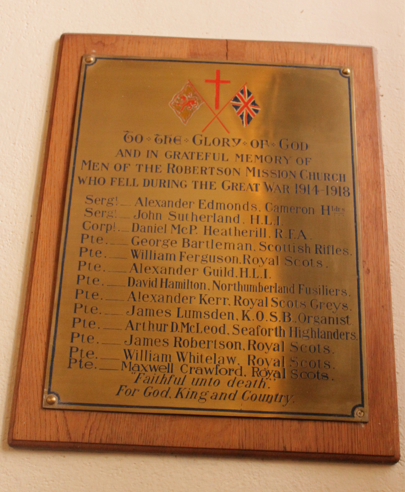
War Memorial from Robertson Memorial Church (now in Greyfriars Kirk)

He was born in Eyemouth, Scotland on 28 July 1805 the third son of Margaret Jameson of Alloa (1769–1805) one William Robert Robertson (1761–1833), a corn merchant in Eyemouth. His mother died a few days after his birth. He was christened on 10 August, a week after her death, and was then apparently sent to live with his mother's family in Alloa where he was then raised.

Robertson studied divinity at the University of Edinburgh and was licensed to preach in the Church of Scotland by the Presbytery of Chirnside in June 1828. His first ordination was as minister of Muckhart in July 1831 but translated to Logie Kirk near Bridge of Allan after a few months, in January 1832, replacing Rev Robert Clason. Immediately after the Disruption of 1843 he moved to Edinburgh and began a much more critical role in the overall structure of the Church of Scotland. This combined the dual role of minister of New Greyfriars in place of James Julius Wood (who had joined the Free Church) and (from 1845) Convenor of the Church of Scotland Committee on Correspondence with Foreign Churches.

When he moved to Edinburgh he initially lived at 12 Drummond Place in the New Town. Greyfriars Kirk was split into two halves at this time: Robertson ministering to the New Greyfriars in the west; Rev Thomas Guthrie ministering to the Old Greyfriars in the east. Unlike the quiet town of either Eyemouth or Alloa, or the rural parishes of Muckhart or Logie, Robertson was immediately shocked by the widespread poverty in Edinburgh, and the high number of adults and children who attended neither school nor church. He set himself the task of addressing this.

During his time in Edinburgh he worked with both Rev Andrew Thomson and Thomas Guthrie in raising funds for the Waldensian Church in France and Italy, raising £12,000 (the equivalent of £2.5 million in 2020). His other great achievement (with Guthrie) was the establishing of what were called Ragged schools which began in Edinburgh in 1846 in response to the perceived poverty and lack of education pervading the lower classes. Robertson began these in 1846 with the Vennel Ragged School, Guthrie following soon after with the Ragged School at Mound Place off Castlehill. These schools addressed the religious instruction of the young. A parallel movement also grew, creating various city missions, to try to attract the growing city population of adults back to the church. By the 1870s the incentives grew, including "breakfast missions" which used a free breakfast as an incentive to then attend the church service thereafter.

In 1868 he received an honorary doctorate (Doctor of Divinity) from the University of Edinburgh.

His final years were spent living in a Georgian terraced house on Calton Hill: 39 Royal Terrace, Edinburgh.

He died during a visit to Cannes, France on 21 February 1882. After his 39 years service at New Greyfriars his position as minister was filled by Rev Henry Cowan.

== Family ==
In July 1834 he married Georgina Touchet Cossins (d. July 1892), daughter of James Cossins of Weymouth, and maternal granddaughter of George, Lord Audley.

Their son William Buxton Robertson served as a captain in the 79th Highlanders; James born 1841 lived only a few days; John Hay Robertson (born 1843); Henry Robert Robertson (b.1845-1855); George Touchet Robertson (born 1847) and Gertrude Susan Audley Robertson DSC (1849–1900).

== Recognition ==
In 1884 the Robertson Memorial Mission Church was erected in his memory of the north-west corner of the Grassmarket. Designed by Hardy & Wight the church incorporates part of the Flodden Wall on its west side. Secularised in the 1954, it spent some years as a salesroom for antiques but is now a public house. A plaque explains the connection to Rev Robertson.

== Publications ==
- Journal of a Clergyman during a Visit to the Peninsula (1845)
- Letters to the Congregation of New Greyfriars from Rome (1850)
- Letters to the Congregation of New Greyfriars from Florence (1851)
- Account of the Parish of Logie (1883)
