= Blairlogie =

Coordinates: 56.14947°N 3.88651°W

Blairlogie: Scottish Gaelic: Blàr Lagaidh
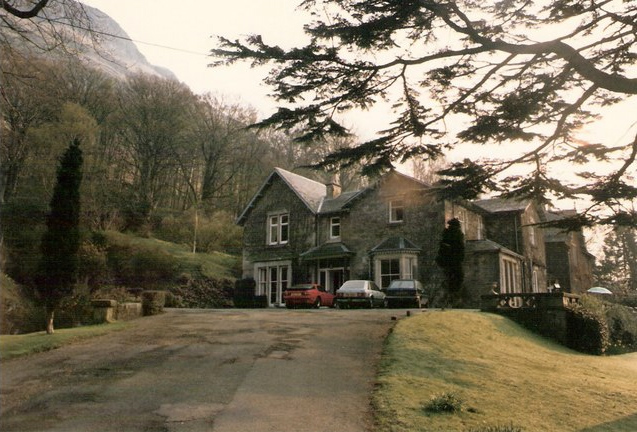
- Blairlogie House

- Location within the Stirling council area
- Population: 58
- OS grid reference: NS829968
- Civil parish: Logie
- Council area: Stirling Council
- Lieutenancy area: Stirling and Falkirk
- Country: Scotland
- Sovereign state: United Kingdom
- Post town: Stirling
- Postcode district: FK9
- Dialling code: 01259
- Police: Scotland
- Fire: Scottish
- Ambulance: Scottish
- UK Parliament: Stirling and Strathallan
- Scottish Parliament: Stirling

Blairlogie is a village in the Stirling council area of Scotland, situated at the base of the great southern rock-face of Dumyat between Stirling and Menstrie.

Blairlogie, formerly Blair, forms part of Logie parish, formerly in Perthshire, and the ancient Logie Kirk lies to the west. It comprises mainly 18th century cottages and a few larger houses like Telford House and Croft House. There is also a former dissenting church dating from 1762 with an adjoining manse of 1843. The centre of the village is 'The Square' set around the crossroads of the former high road which was bypassed with a new road in the early nineteenth century. It was designated as one of central Scotland's earliest Conservation areas in 1969.

At the foot of Castle Law (and giving its name to the hill) stands Blairlogie Castle (also known as "The Blair"), built in 1543 by Alexander Spittal. The castle and surrounding estate was purchased by Lt Col Hare of Calder Hall in 1891 who modernised it.

An abandoned copper mine lies to the east of the village.

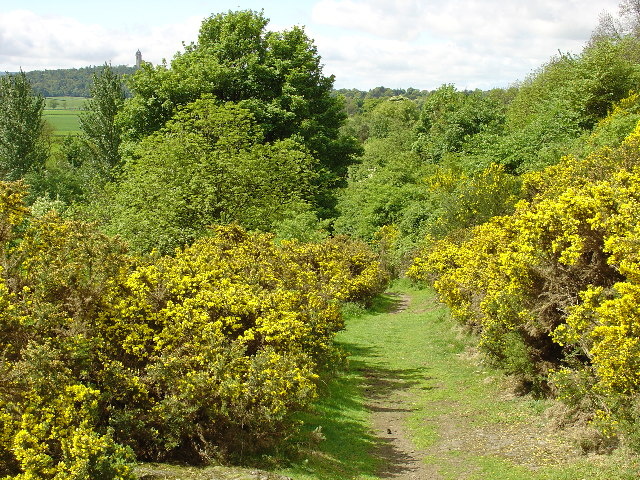
Old drove track at Cotkerse by Blairlogie

Between 1598 and 1609, the minister of Logie Kirk was the poet Alexander Hume.

In 1811 a census of the village showed 36 families, containing around 140 people including the minister, five shoemakers, a weaver and a tailor.

In 1940 the actor and conservationist, Moultrie Kelsall, restored an eighteenth-century building, Kirklea Cottage as a family home. This early conservation project is discussed in 'A future for the past' published jointly with Stuart Harris in 1961. Kelsall also was instrumental in saving nearby Menstrie Castle and his son Robin wrote of his youth in the village.

The Scottish International rugby player Kenny Logan used to live in the village and several of his relatives live in the area.
