= J. D. M. Stirling =

Dr John Davy Morries Stirling of Blackgrange FRSE (1810–21 October 1858) was a 19th-century Scottish physician, inventor and chemist. He discovered elaterine in 1833, and in 1846 took out a patent on "Stirling's toughened iron". In 1854 he was the first person to cast metal pipes (rather than roll them and weld them) much improving their integrity and lifespan.

== Life ==
He was born John Davie Morries in 1810 the son of Jane Davie and Captain Andrew Morries (1779-1856) of the Royal Navy. In 1820 the family was living at 4 Ladyfield Place in Edinburgh.

He studied medicine at the University of Edinburgh, gaining his doctorate (MD) in 1831.

In 1834 he was elected a Fellow of the Royal Society of Edinburgh, his proposer being Sir Robert Christison. In 1841 he became a member of the Highland Society. He was then living at 4 Ladyfield Place off Morrison Street in Edinburgh. He then practiced for some years in London plus a brief time in Norway. In 1854 he was living in Birmingham.

He died on 21 October 1858, and is buried in the churchyard of Logie Kirk east of Stirling. He is also memorialised on his parents grave in New Calton Burial Ground.

== Family ==
On 7 May 1840 in Brighton he married the heiress Mary Wedderburn Stirling of Blackgrange (1814–1893), daughter of Patrick Stirling of Kippendavie near Dunblane. After their marriage he adopted the surname Stirling.

They had one son, John M. Morries Stirling of Gogar and Blackgrange (b.1851 in Edinburgh, d.1912 in Nairn). In 1861 he is recorded as living in Headtown in Clackmannanshire.
