= William Cruden =

Scottish minister and author

William Cruden (1726–1785) was a Scottish minister and author.

== Life ==
He was the son of Alexander Cruden, beadle at Pitsligo. He graduated M.A. at Marischal College, Aberdeen in 1743.

Cruden became minister of Logie-Pert, Craigo, near Montrose, in 1753.

== Connection with the Relief Church ==
In the 1760s, Cruden became involved with the foundation of the schismatic Relief Church. Its initial role was to allow congregations to bypass the nomination of ministers.

Matters began with the parish of Logie Kirk, Stirlingshire. There the incumbent minister, Patrick Duchall, died in 1758. Both John Murray, 4th Earl of Dunmore and John Erskine of Carnock claimed to be patrons, with the right to nominate to the living. While they agreed at first on a candidate, James Frame, there was intense local opposition, and Frame took another position. In 1759, Cruden received a "call" to Logie. The presbytery, however, understood that Dunmore still held to his rights; and delayed. Cruden became the Erskine candidate, through a proxy (James Haldane of Plean); Dunmore put forward James Wright. In 1760, the General Assembly on appeal reversed the decision of the local Synod, against Dunmore; and Wright was given the settlement. The local group asked the "Presbytery of Relief", formed in 1761, for support; and had a church built, which in 1762 went to John Warden.

In 1765 James Baine was approached, to set up a Relief church in Edinburgh. Cruden's name was raised at an initial stage. In the end it was Baine who gained full support, and came to Edinburgh, in early 1766.

Cruden came to Glasgow in 1767; again a "relief" was provided after a secession from an existing congregation. It occurred at Glasgow's Wynd Church, which had been held by a Moderate, William Craig. The church was rebuilt from 1762, Craig moving within the city, and the council brought in another like-minded minister, George Bannatyne, in 1764, over the wishes of some.

Cruden then was brought to the Albion Road Chapel of the Relief Church. Some of his congregation turned against him, however, in a complicated affair involving examination of a student. He clashed also with David Dale the merchant, a member of the Albion Road congregation. Dale left, moving on to form an Independent congregation in Grey Friars Wynd.

In the debates of the early 1770s within the Relief Church, Cruden lost the argument against some form of open communion. Shortly afterwards he left the church. The Albion Street congregation broke up three ways, with the group remaining with the chapel rejoining the Church of Scotland.

== Later life ==
Cruden was then elected minister of the Scotch presbyterian church in Crown Court, Covent Garden, London, in 1773, in succession to Thomas Oswald.

Cruden died on 5 November 1785, aged 60, and was buried in Bunhill Fields cemetery.

== Works ==
Cruden's works are:

- Hymns on a variety of Divine Subjects, Aberdeen, 1761. There was a later edition (1800) by Robert Carr Blackenbury.
- Nature Spiritualised, in a variety of Poems, containing pious and practical observations on the works of nature, and the ordinary occurrences in life, London, 1766.
- Sermons on Evangelical and Practical Subjects, London, 1787; with portrait prefixed, engraved by T. Trotter from a painting by D. Allen.

== Family ==
Cruden married Clementina Hadden, and they had four children. Their son John Cruden (1754–1787) was a loyalist in British North America, and a figure of the American Revolutionary War period, in touch through his father with William Legge, 2nd Earl of Dartmouth.

== Notes ==
Attribution

This article incorporates text from a publication now in the public domain: Stephen, Leslie, ed. (1888). "Cruden, William". Dictionary of National Biography. Vol. 13. London: Smith, Elder & Co.
