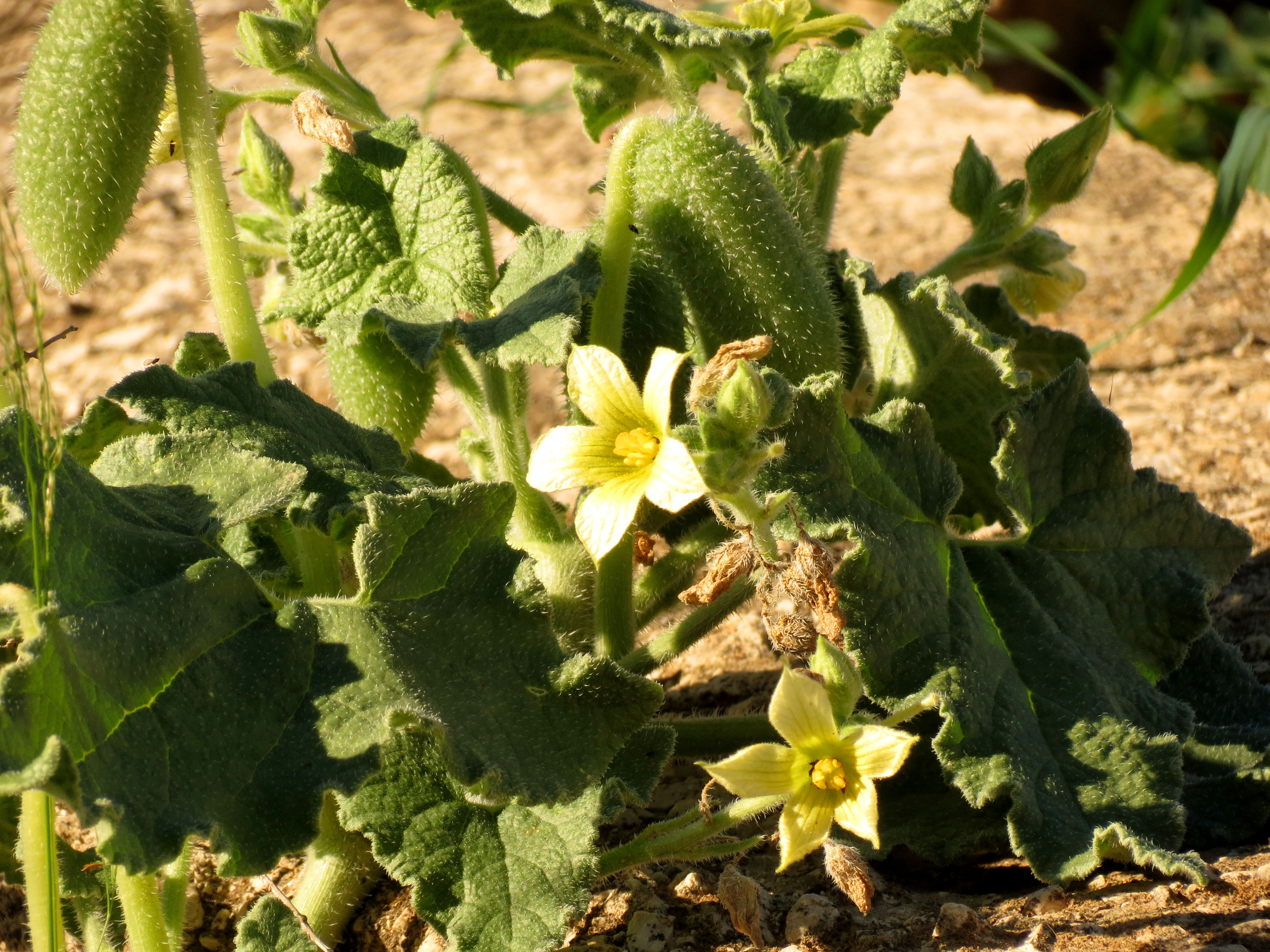
- Foliage, flower and fruit, Alicante, Spain.

Scientific classification
- Kingdom: Plantae
- Clade: Tracheophytes
- Clade: Angiosperms
- Clade: Eudicots
- Clade: Rosids
- Order: Cucurbitales
- Family: Cucurbitaceae
- Subfamily: Cucurbitoideae
- Tribe: Bryonieae
- Genus: Ecballium; A.Rich.
- Species: E. elaterium

Binomial name
- Ecballium elaterium (L.) A.Rich.

Synonyms
- Ecballion W.D.J.Koch; Elaterium Mill.

= Ecballium =

Squirting cucumber

Genus of plants

Ecballium is a genus of flowering plants in the family Cucurbitaceae containing a single species, Ecballium elaterium, also called the squirting cucumber. Its unusual common name derives from the ripe fruit squirting a stream of mucilaginous liquid containing its seeds as a means of seed dispersal, an example of rapid plant movement.

== Description ==
Ecballium elaterium is a herbaceous perennial plant with a tuberous root, usually trailing on the ground but sometimes shrubby, with bristly stems. The leaves are lobed, greyish-green, and rough-surfaced and bristly-hairy. The flowers have a five-lobed yellow corolla, 2–5 cm (0.79–1.97 in) diameter, maturing into an oval green or blue-green fruit about 5 cm (2.0 in) long, resembling a tiny but hairy cucumber.

== Distribution ==
E. elaterium is native to southern Europe, northwestern Africa, and southwestern Asia. It is grown as an ornamental plant elsewhere, and has become naturalised locally in Australia, central and western Europe, central Asia, New Zealand, and eastern North America. It is considered an invasive species.

== Seed dispersal ==
The tissue in the fruit of the Ecballium elaterium that surrounds the seeds is made of large, thin-walled cells facilitating the propulsive release of seeds by "squirting". Pressure to expel the seeds is created by the increased concentration of a glucoside called elaterinidin in the sap of the fruit tissue cells, leading to a turgor pressure of up to 27 atms. The seeds are projected as far as 7–8 m (23–26 ft). The pressure builds up until its force detaches the fruit from the stalk. At the same time, the pericarp contracts and the fruit and seeds are ejected through the hole produced by detachment. The pressure-building method may depend on the phloem sieve tubes, indicating that the squirting mechanism can be decreased in water stressed conditions.

The fruit also uses hygroscopic movement and stored elastic energy to squirt the seeds out of the fruit. This method is accomplished passively; the fruit changes its structure as it dehydrates and deteriorates, causing movement. This movement may be due to coiling, bending, or twisting cells to change its morphological shape as the cells dry. Because drying cells are mostly made up of cell wall, the shape is determined by the cell wall, providing a method for catapulting of seeds to eject them out of the plant.

Sudden movements in plant tissues are prone to different types of mechanical instabilities. In the case of E. elaterium, due to the relationship between the duration of movement and the size of the tissue, the plant tissue fractures. Effectiveness of the dispersal seems to be low; one study found that even though E. elaterium could have sprayed its seed into an entire plot, the size and locations of all areas in which it was present remained relatively similar.

== History in folk medicine ==
Elaterine is the cucurbitacin extract used in ancient history as a purgative in folk medicine. Extracted from the juice of the fruit of E. elaterium, elaterine was discovered by Stirling in 1835. Elaterin is extracted from elaterium by chloroform and then precipitated by ether. It has the formula C_{32}H_{44}O_{7}. It forms colourless scales which have a bitter taste, with evidence as a poison when consumed through the nose or mouth. The British pharmacopeia contained a preparation, the Pulvis Elaterini Compositus.

According to the Encyclopædia Britannica Eleventh Edition, "[t]he action of this extract resembles that of the saline aperients, but is much more powerful. It is the most active hydragogue purgative known, 'causing also much depression and violent griping'. When injected subcutaneously, it is inert, as its action is entirely dependent upon its admixture with the bile. The drug is undoubtedly valuable in cases of dropsy and Bright's disease, and also in cases of cerebral haemorrhage, threatened or present. It must not be used except in urgent cases, and must invariably be employed with the utmost care, especially if the state of the heart be unsatisfactory."

In the 21st century, elaterium and its constituents are considered a poison, with several case reports of hospitalisation, edema of the uvula, and necrosis of the nasal mucosa resulting from nasal or oral consumption.

== Gallery ==
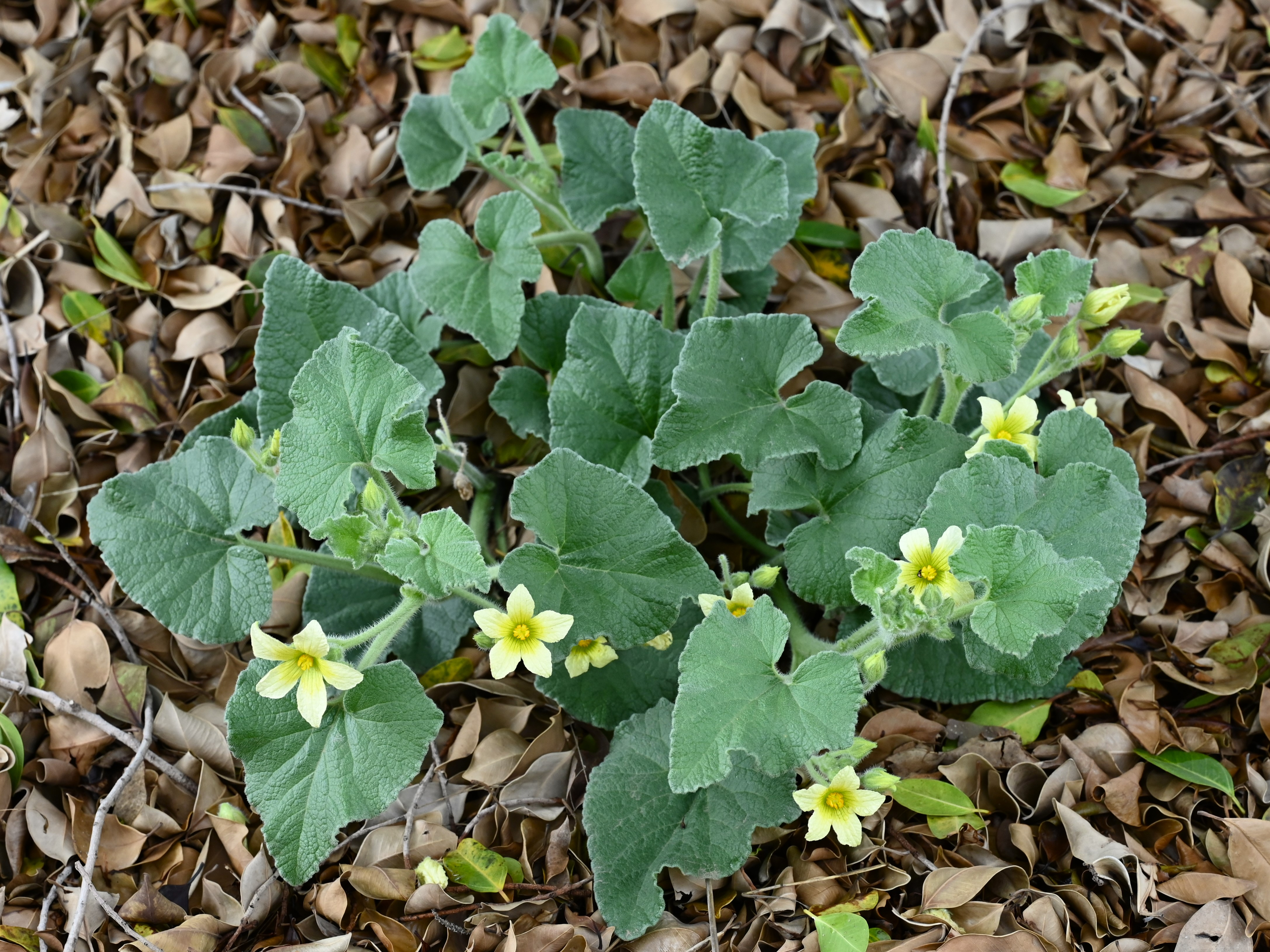
Leaves and flowers near Malaga

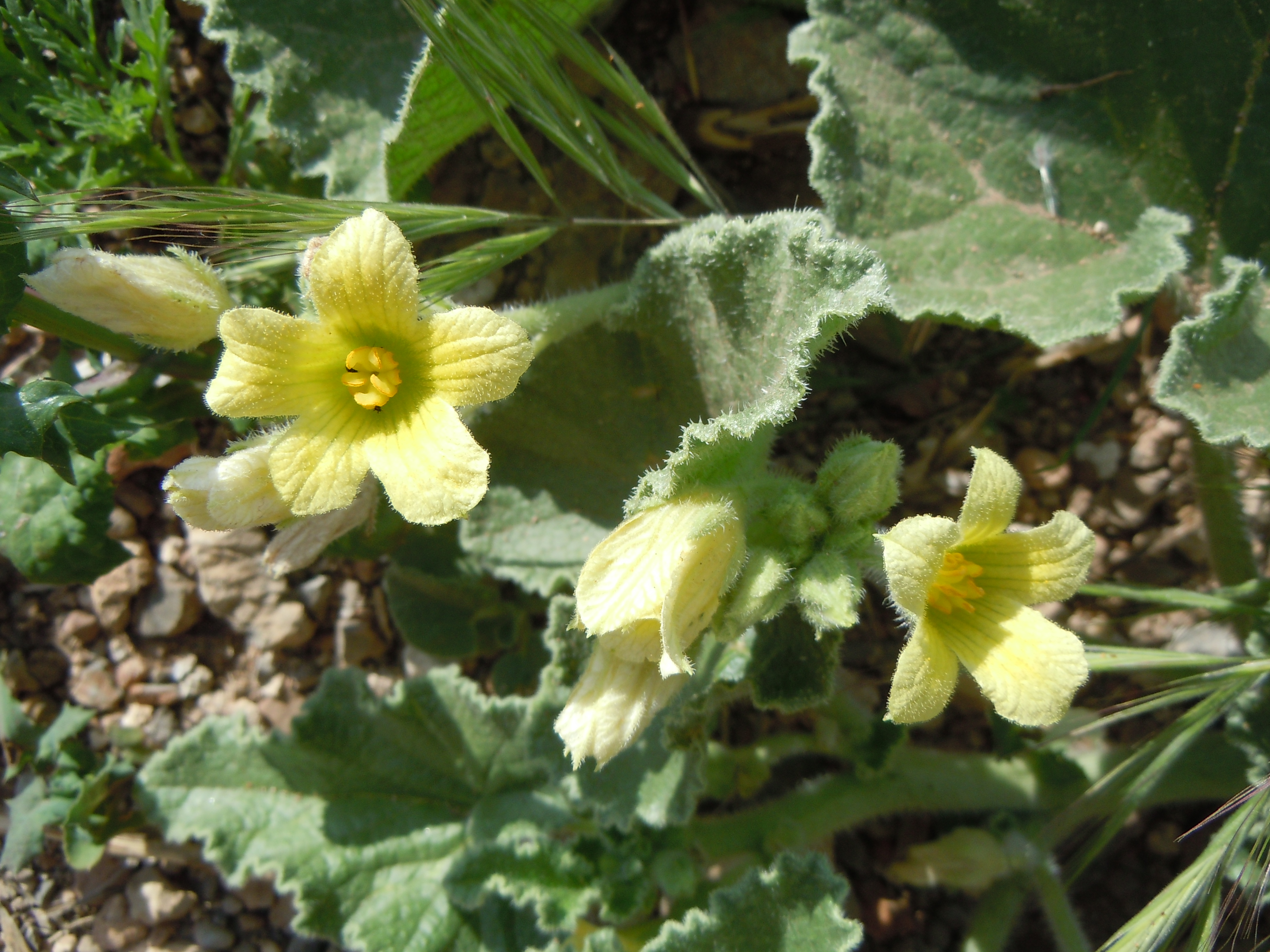
Detail of the flowers

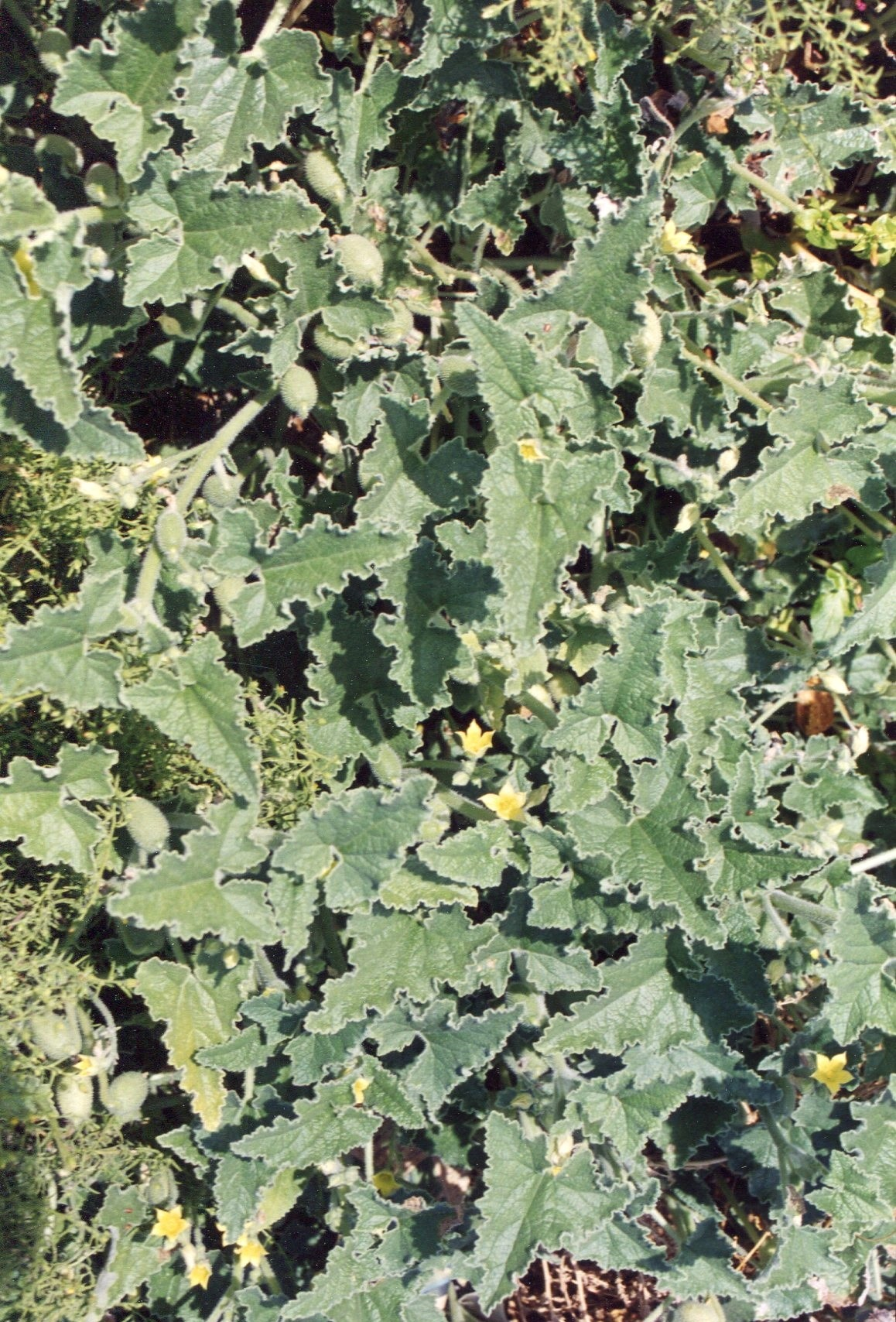
Plant, Yenifoça, Turkey

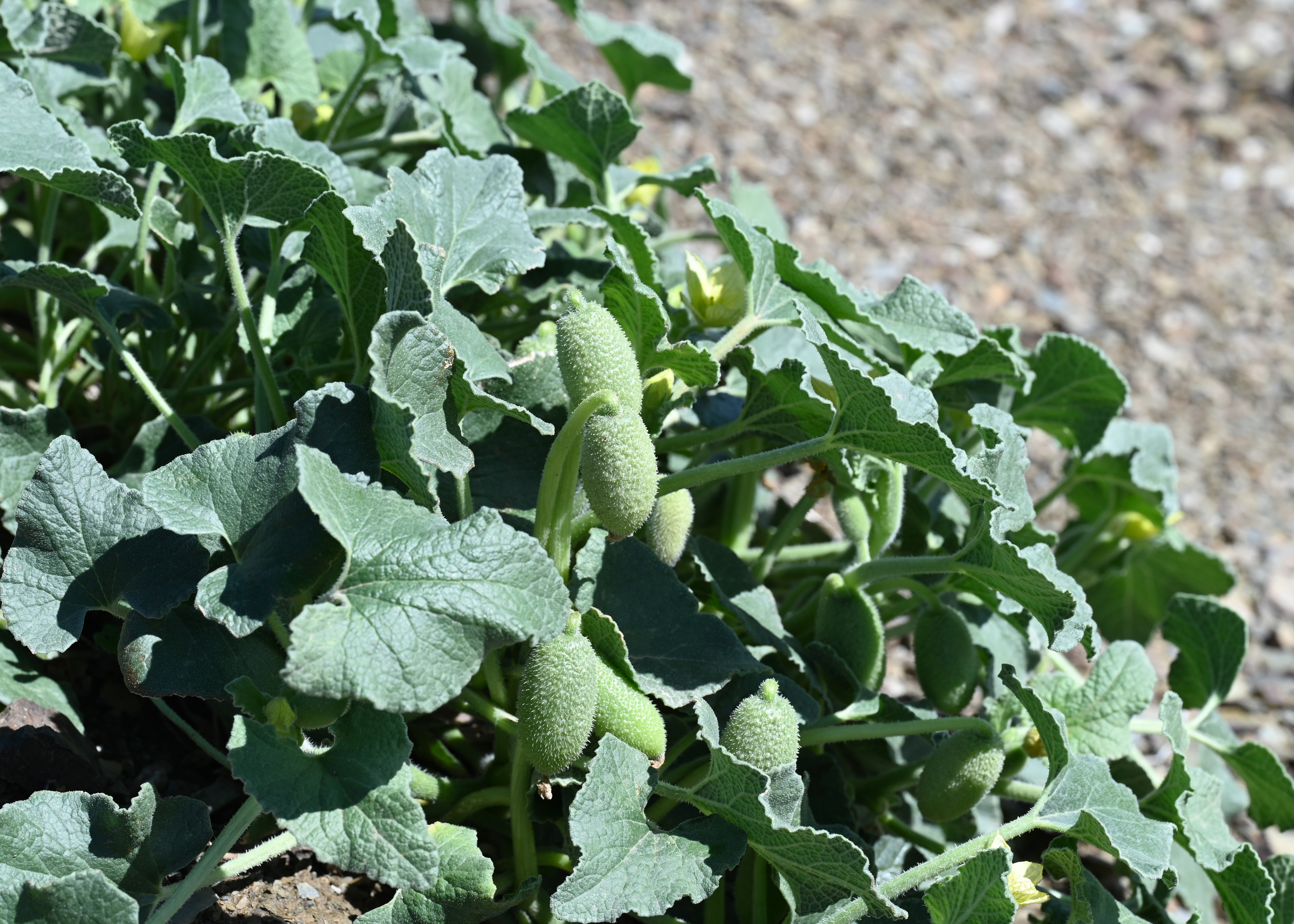
Leaves and fruit

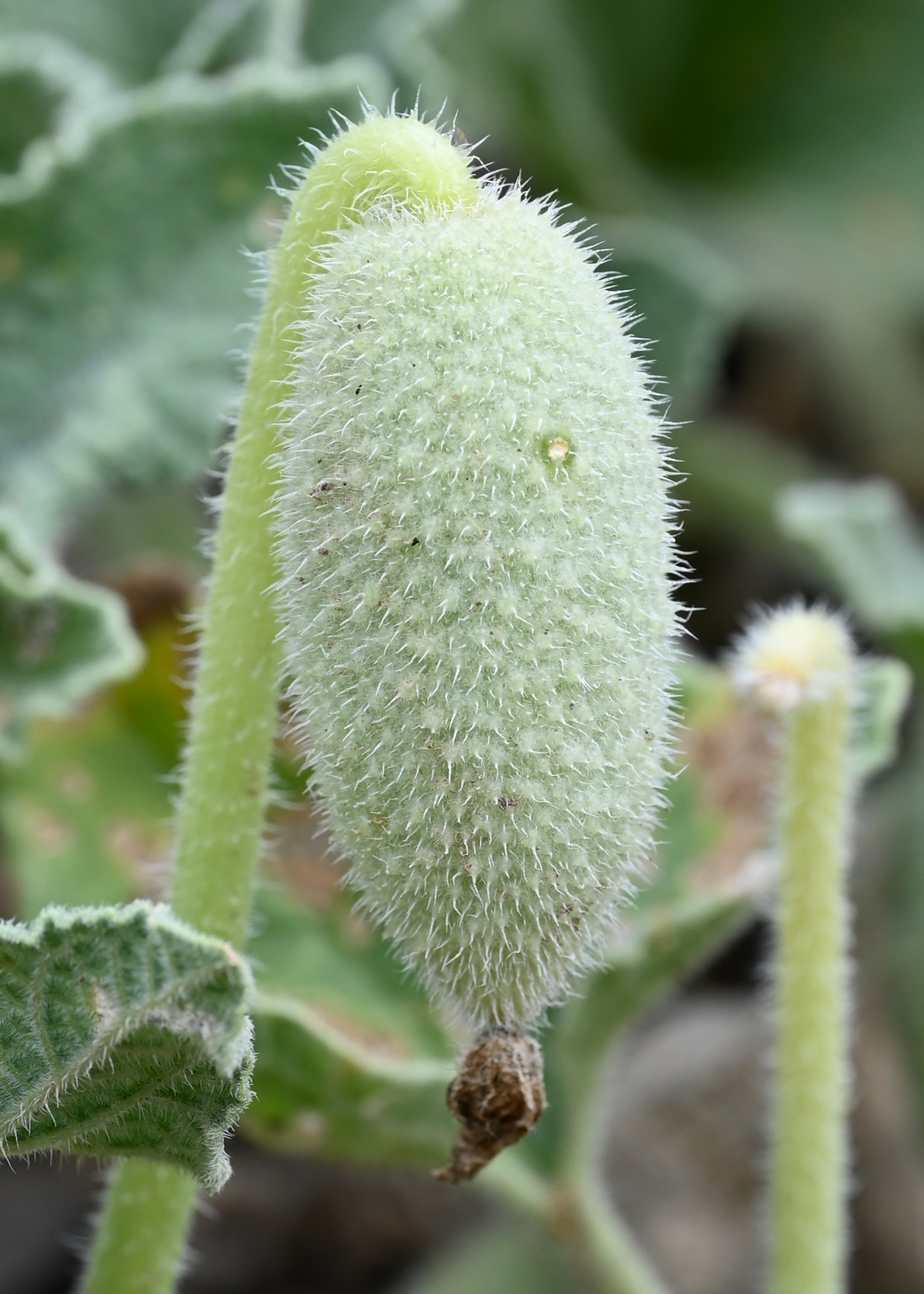
Detail of the fruit

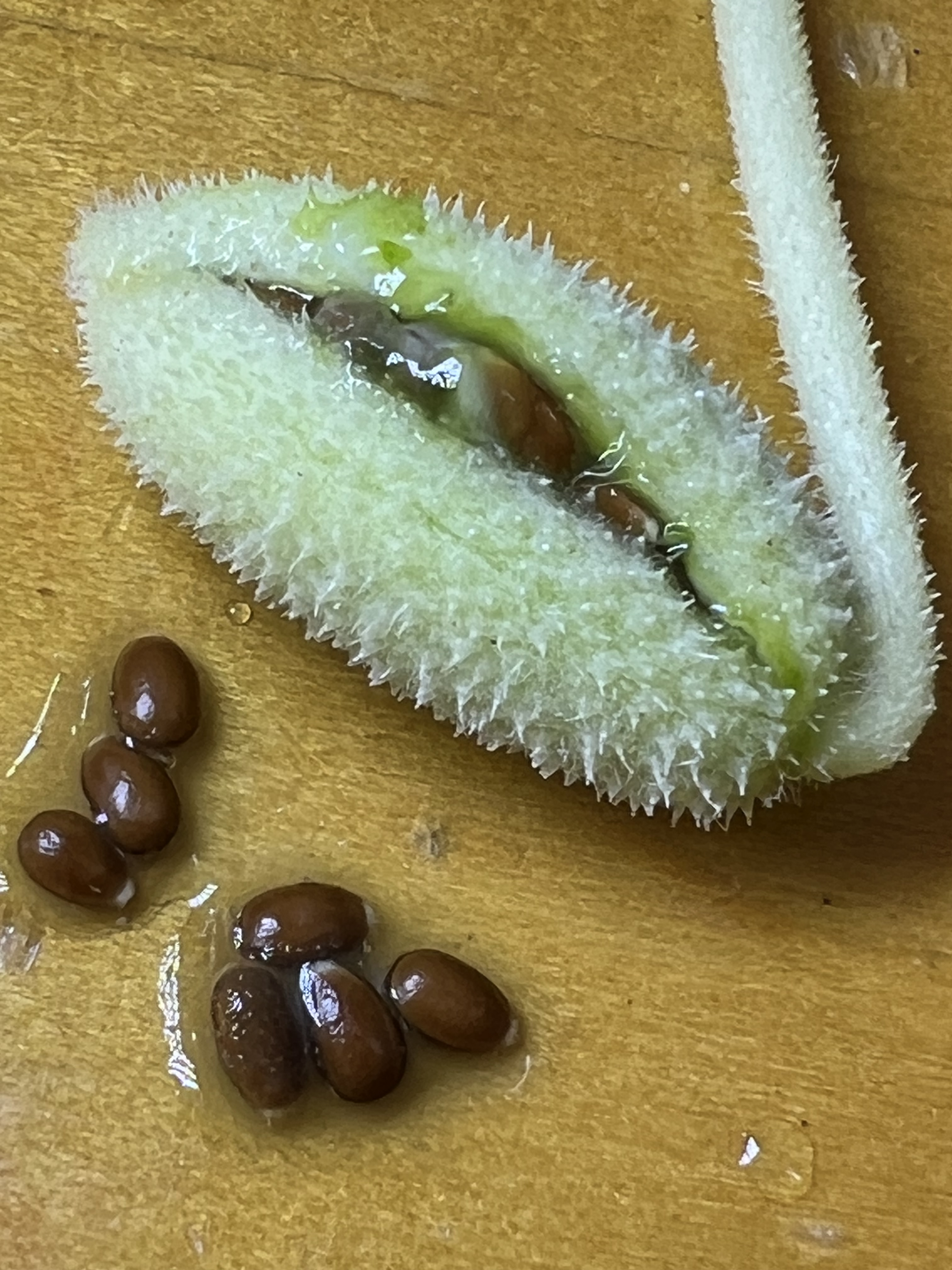
Cut fruit and seeds, Israel

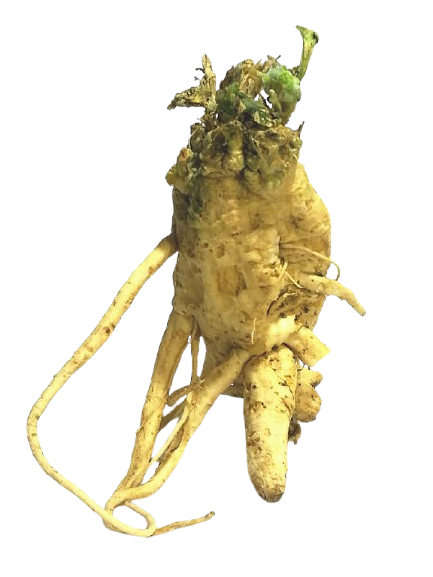
Root, Iran
