= Cruden =

Cruden is a surname. Notable people with the surname include:

- Aaron Cruden (born 1989), New Zealand rugby player
- Alexander Cruden (1699–1770), Scottish author
- Damian Cruden, British theatre director
- James Cruden, birth name of Jack Milroy (1915–2001), Scottish comedian
- Siegfried Cruden, (born 1959), Surinamese track and field athlete
- William Cruden (1726–1785), Scottish minister and author

== See also ==
- Cruden BV, motion simulators
- Cruden Bay, village in Scotland
- Cruden (parish), parish in Aberdeenshire, Scotland
- Cruden's Concordance, book written by Alexander Cruden
