= Logie Kirk =

Church near Stirling, Scotland

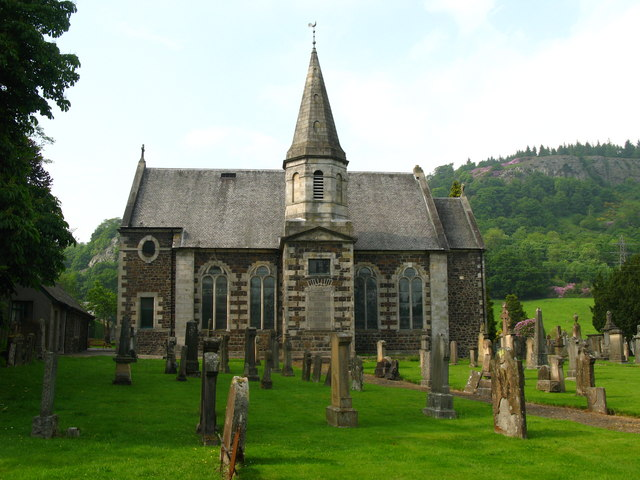
Logie Kirk and graveyard

Logie Kirk is a Church of Scotland church near Stirling in central Scotland. It is located in a rural location at the foot of Dumyat at the western side of the Ochil Hills, east of Stirling and near Stirling University. It serves Cambuskenneth, Bridge of Allan, Causewayhead (eastern Stirling), and formerly the estate of Airthrey Castle (now the campus of Stirling University).

The church lies on the B998 close to the junction with the A91 which runs from Stirling to Menstrie, between the Wallace Monument and Blairlogie.

== Old Kirk ==
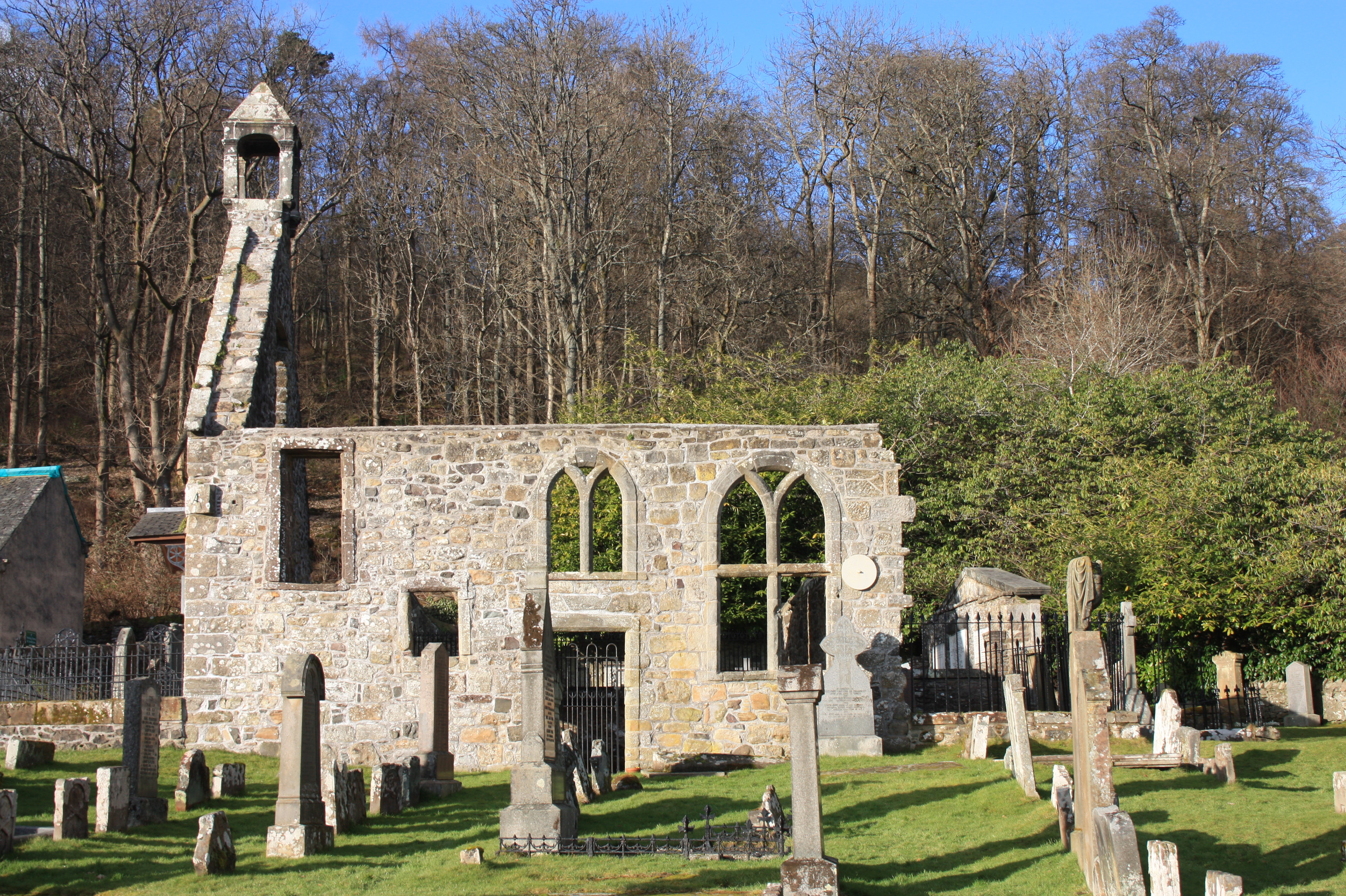
Old Logie Kirk

The church is one of the oldest Christian sites in Scotland, being established during the reign of King David I of Scotland (between 1124 and 1153). A church was built here by ay least 1183 and local tradition suggests it was dedicated to St Serf. There are indications of an older Christian establishment: there are up to four 10th/11th century hogbacks in the cemetery. The church was rebuilt in 1380 and survived in use until after the Reformation (1560). The current ruins are from a church commissioned by Rev Alexander Fargy who served the parish from 1560 to 1592. The church was ruinous in 1684 and Rev George Shaw organised its reconstruction. The rebuilding was undertaken by Tobias Bauchop of Alloa.

The manse stood to the west in the grounds of Airthrey Castle and dated from around 1590, Rev Fargy having resided in Tullibody. A new manse was built in 1698 by Rev Alexander Douglas.

The church was originally linked to a priory at North Berwick under the diocese of Dunblane Cathedral but post-Reformation came under the patronage of Robert, Lord Elphinstone.

The remnants of the original church lie to the north of the current church (at 56°09′03″N 3°54′32″W). The tiny churchyard has many ancient stones (including some 10th/11th century hogback graves) and several notable burials:

- General Sir James Edward Alexander (1803–1885)
- John Campbell (died 1715), a Highlander killed in the nearby Battle of Sheriffmuir
- Rev Robert Clason (died 1831)
- Prof William Jolly Duncan FRS (1894–1960)
- Rev Alexander Fargy (died 1592)
- Very Rev Alexander Hume (1558–1609)
- The Graham family of Airthrey Castle
- William York Macgregor RSA (1855–1923), landscape artist
- Dr J. D. M. Stirling FRSE (1810–1858), inventor

The cemetery is managed by local volunteers and tours are available upon request. See the volunteers’ website www.oldlogie.org

== New Kirk ==
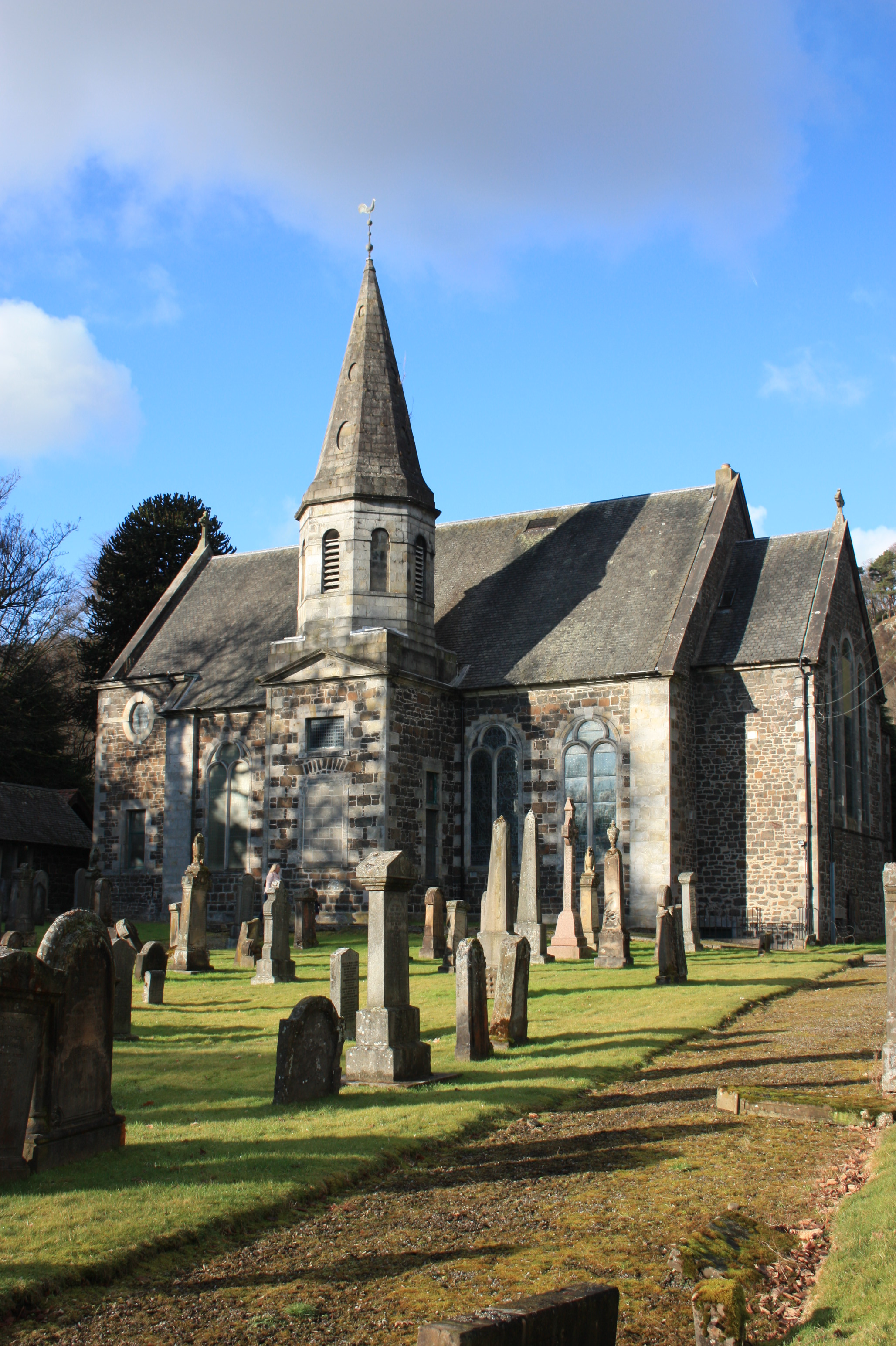
Logie Kirk

The current church dates from 1805 and was built under the instruction of Rev Robert Clason (died 1831) on land gifted by Sir Robert Abercromby of Airthrey. A new manse was built at the same time. The architect for both was William Stirling of Dunblane. The church has been remodelled several times.

- Surgeon-General George Bidie (1830–1913)
- Robert Lindsay Galloway (1844–1908) mine engineer
- Rev Dr John Arnott MacCulloch minister and mythologist
- Major General Thomas Poblerton (1807–1889)
- Edmund Pullar (1848–1926) of Pullars of Perth
- Frederick Pullar FRSE (1875–1901) and his father Laurence Pullar FRSE (1838–1926) a beautiful monument by George Frampton
- William Black Pullar (1844–1919)
- Very Rev David Smith Moderator of the General Assembly of the Church of Scotland 1985/86
- James Stark (statistician) FRSE (1811–1890) creator of vital statistics

== Ministers ==
- Alexander Fargy served 1560 to 1592
- Rev John Millar served 1592 to 1597
- Very Rev Alexander Hume served 1597 to 1609 famous for his poetry and as Moderator of the General Assembly
- On Hume's untimely death in 1609 there was a gap in ministry
- Rev James Saittone or Seytoun of Denny served 1610 to 1615.
- Rev Henry Shaw or Schaw served 1615 to 1648. Shaw (or Schaw) was a descendant of Sir James Schaw of Sauchie. He is sometimes referred to as Shaw of Knockhill.
- His son Rev George Shaw succeeded him and was minister from 1648 to 1688 giving a total family tie to the church of 73 years.
- During the troubles of 1688 to 1690 the church appointed Rev Alexander Douglass, son of Very Rev Robert Douglass of Edinburgh, but Shaw did not give up the church or manse so Douglass preached from a rival hall in Blairlogie
- Shaw was forced to retire in 1690 and Alexander Douglas properly succeeded him serving until 1720
- Rev Partick Duchal served 1721 to 1758 at his death, followed by a period of vacancy
- Rev James Wright (1720–1800) from Dairsie served 1761 (an unpopular choice causing a schism and a rival Secession Church). Wright also troubled the Presbytery more widely causing him to be charged with Bribery and Simony in 1771. He died in 1800 after 40 years of unpopular service.
- Rev Robert Clason, served 1801 until 1831, father to very Rev Patrick Clason, Moderator of the General Assembly of the Free Church of Scotland 1848/49
- Rev William Robertson of Alloa who had previously served in Muckhart served 1832 until 1843 when he was translated to Greyfriars Kirk in Edinburgh
- Rev Robert John Johnstone from Wooler, previously serving in Auchtermuchty, served 1844 to 1871 (death)
- Rev David Neil Imrie served 1872 until 1884 when he translated to St Johns in Edinburgh
- Rev Robert Menzies Fergusson from Sorn served 1885 until at least 1909
- Rev David Smith (1923–1997) served 1965 to 1989 and was Moderator of the General Assembly of the Church of Scotland 1985/86
- Rev David D Scott 1990–1999
- Rev Stuart Fulton served until 2017
- Rev Ruth Halley 2017–2019
- Rev Jan Steyn 2022–present
