= Cruden BV =

Dutch motion-based racing simulator

Cruden B.V.
- Type: Private
- Industry: Automotive Simulation
- Founded: 2006
- Headquarters: Amsterdam, Netherlands
- Key people: Maarten van Donselaar (CEO)
- Products: Racing simulator
- Website: Cruden.com

Cruden B.V. is a Dutch motion-based racing simulator designing and manufacturing company based in Amsterdam. Founders of Cruden have been developing professional motion simulators since the 1990s. Their experience in designing simulators for the aerospace industry led them to use this knowledge to branch out into the marine, automotive, and motorsport industries. Cruden is also branded as Hexatech.

Cruden is formed of dynamists, software developers, mechanical engineers, and project managers. Sales and service operations are located in Canada, Australia, Singapore and South Africa.

Cruden supplies simulators to companies in the automotive industry, universities, research institutes, international motorsport companies, and global attractions. The company also produces simulator components and operation software, and plans to expand the production into motion-based rides.

The company headquarters are designed to house the simulator manufacturing process, including simulator components and developing new products, such as multiple guest interactivity simulators for the attractions industry. The building houses all functional teams covering the mechanical design of Cruden components and systems.

== History ==
Cruden B.V. started in professional flight and marine industries, but also had driving simulators. Originating from Fokker Aircraft Company, the company was previously known as FCS Racing Simulation and was renamed Cruden in 2006.

In 2003, FCS took its flight simulation technology and developed a racing simulator that combined a motion base with a detailed dynamic vehicle model, motion-cueing software, and professional image generation.

Since 2005, the company has started projects in the entertainment and industrial markets, and for Formula 1 teams. In 2009, Cruden decided to provide service to the North American market by starting US operations.

== Products ==
=== Hexatech simulator ===
- Driver and/or hardware in the loop simulation tool.
- 6 degrees of freedom
- Compatible with Matlab/Simulink and integration of simulation models Vi-Grade, IPG CarMaker, veDYNA, CarSim, and SIMPACK.
- Vehicle characteristics can be modeled and changed: Wheelbase and track, tires, suspension settings, drive train (engine, gearbox, differentials) aerodynamic settings, steering, brakes, and driver aids such as traction control, ABS and others.
- Realistic steering feedback.
- Image generation with reduced motion blur.
- Real-time CG shadowing and environment mapping.
- 42" monitors or alternatively projectors on a curved screen to fully immerse the driver.
- Seat belt tensioners.
- Energy efficient electromechanical motion system consumes 5 kWh of electricity.
- Steering systems with original steering wheel.
- Original pedal boxes.
- Projector systems (on and off-board).
- Simulation Software and Content (Cars, tracks, public roads, racing circuit etc.)
- Telemetry analyser, PiToolBox, MoTeC, Bosch WinDarab and Magneti Marelli WinTax are the supported interfaces.

=== Motorsports ===
Cruden simulators are preferred by motorsport and Formula 1 teams. Companies prefer simulators to reduce their testing budget and try different vehicle settings in a shorter time frame. However, simulators are not only preferred in motorsport for time and budget concerns, the improvements in simulators also lead motorsport companies to focus on simulators. Such as, improved realism, accuracy, providing feedback, and improved simulator algorithms.

Motorsport simulator's image creation and simulator components are also provided by the company as well. This enables the creation of a more realistic atmosphere for the driver inside the simulator. The simulator can be modified from the demands of the customers from hardware to exterior and interior design to provide an experience that is more realistic.

The Gadget Show featured the simulator on 8 March 2010 (Season 13, Episode 6) by Jason Bradbury. He tried the simulator and tried to break the lap record at Holland's Circuit Zandvoort in a Formula 1 car. The lap record was 1 minute 19 seconds and he achieved 1 minute 24.7 seconds. He mentioned that the simulator was so realistic in terms of mental and physical effects. And also mentioned the technological features of the simulator, which were mentioned previously.

=== Automotive ===
The Cruden car simulator has the same principles as the motorsport simulators. The simulator for the automotive industry is built to the demands from the clients. Therefore, most of the automotive simulators are not the same and offer different types of simulation. Some of the simulators are embedded to a real car interior and users experience real life conditions during the simulation.

Like a motorsports simulator, an automotive simulator is capable of transferring data to telemetry.

The simulator has the opportunity to engage electronic systems such as Bosch ESP and experience the influence on the driving. Moreover, different tire pressures and tire temperatures can be adjusted on the simulator.

Mercedes-Benz used a Cruden simulator during the development of its C-Class to experience different suspension settings, shock absorbers, springs, seats, engine mounts and car structure. According to Mercedes-Benz, using the simulator during the product development stage reduced costs, time and also enabled engineers to accurately identify the different settings on the vehicle.

Mercedes-Benz also asked Cruden to develop a ride simulator for the international press to experience different ride settings as a passenger during the launch for C-Class. This simulator accommodated two people in a seated position.

=== Education ===
Cruden offers the simulator systems for educational purposes. The simulator offers the same features as the other models and enables students to experience their theories and car models without facing high costs. Another important impact of using simulators in education is the development and improvement of human-machine interfaces.

Engagement of simulators in education is also recognized by academics, and University of Hertfordshire School of Engineering and Technology offers a Cruden simulator for their students to experience and validate their car models, it is available from the first year undergraduate students.

The features and characteristics of this simulator are the same with other models and also it can be customized with the demands from customers.

=== Attractions ===
Ferrari World in Yas Island, Abu Dhabi features ten different simulators to experience Ferrari F1 cars and Ferrari models in the Scuderia Challenge attraction. There are two Ferrari F1 simulators that drive an F1 car around different circuits inside the simulator. According to Ferrari, these are the same simulators that are used to train their pilots.

The simulators are also available in Vortex Racing in Canada at Vortex Racing in Montreal (Lachine), I-WAY in Lyon, France, and Grand Pier in North Somerset, UK. Moreover, simulators for attraction and entertainment are optimized for transportation, installation and consumption of space, these simulators' size and mass are reduced by thirty percent to satisfy these needs. Moreover, different seat versions can be applied like in other versions.

=== Private Use ===
Simulators can be purchased for private use. The features of the private use simulator are the same as the other versions.
