= Jonathan Dickinson (New Jersey minister) =

American minister and co-founder of Princeton University (1688–1747)

The Reverend Jonathan Dickinson
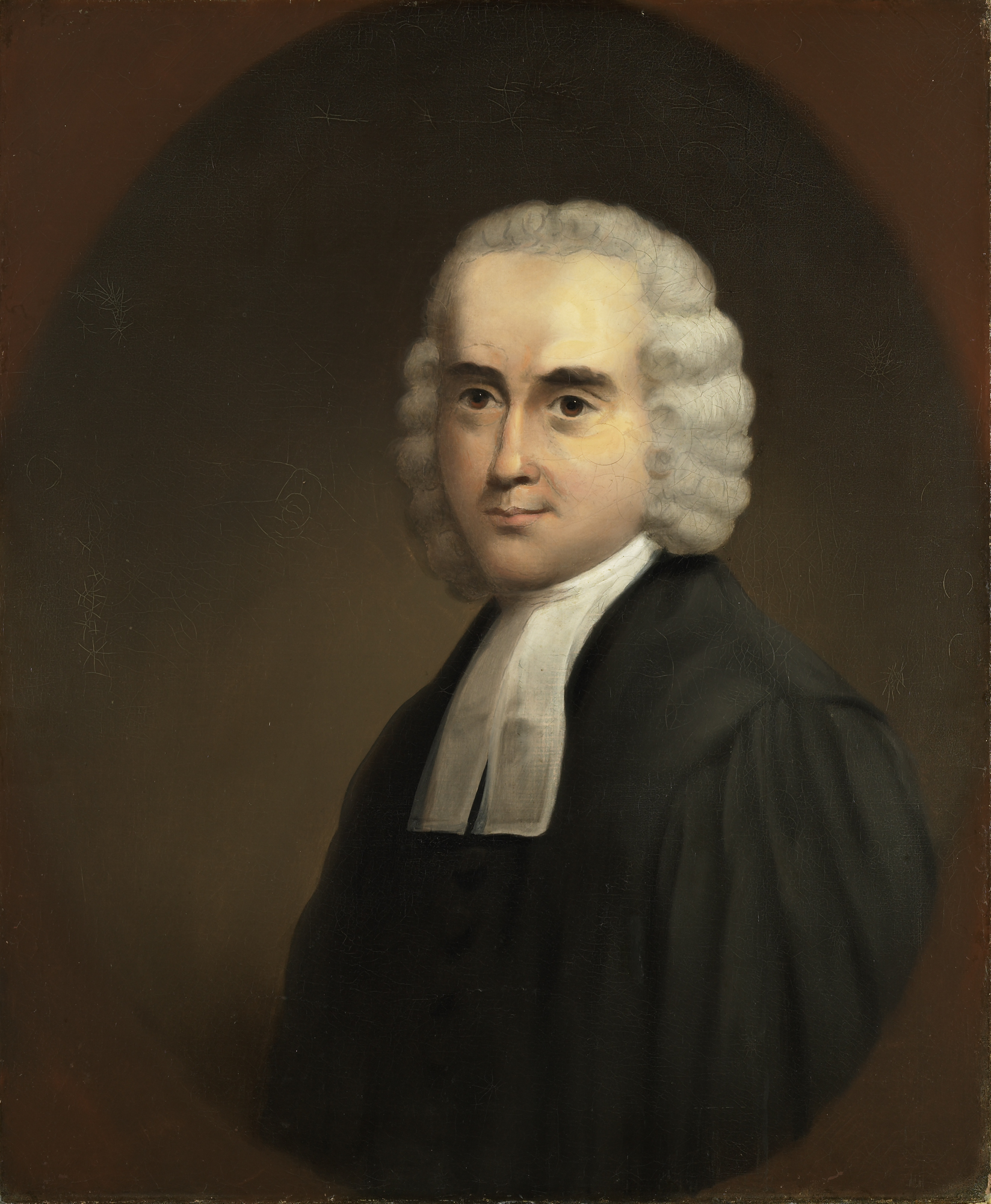
- Edward Ludlow Mooney, Jonathan Dickinson (1688–1747), President (1747), Princeton University Art Museum

1st President of Princeton University
- In office 1747–1747
- Preceded by: Position established
- Succeeded by: Aaron Burr Sr.

Personal details
- Born: April 22, 1688 Hatfield, Massachusetts Bay
- Died: October 7, 1747 (aged 59) Elizabethtown, Province of New Jersey

Jonathan Dickinson (April 22, 1688 – October 7, 1747) was a Congregational, later Presbyterian, minister, a leader in the Great Awakening of the 1730s and 1740s, and a co-founder and first president of the College of New Jersey, which later became Princeton University.

== Biography ==
Born in Hatfield, Massachusetts on April 22, 1688, Dickinson studied theology at the Collegiate School of Connecticut, later known as Yale College, graduating in 1706. In 1709, Dickinson was ordained minister of the Congregational church in Elizabethtown, New Jersey.

Dickinson became concerned about the attempts of the established Church of England to suppress dissenters in New Jersey. Seeing a need for more coordination among dissenting churches, in 1717 Dickinson persuaded his congregation to join the Presbytery of Philadelphia. He became an active and influential participant in the affairs of the Presbyterians, and was twice elected moderator of the Synod of Philadelphia. As a former Congregationalist, Dickinson was part of the New England faction of Presbyterians who opposed the strict doctrinal requirements favored by the Scots-Irish faction. Dickinson was a strong supporter of Presbyterianism, earning a reputation as a leading defender of Calvinism in America. His book Familiar Letters to a Gentleman, upon a Variety of Seasonable and Important Subjects in Religion was reprinted a number of times in America and elsewhere.

The Great Awakening that started in the 1730s profoundly changed religion in the American colonies. The Presbyterians were divided into "New Sides" and "Old Sides", supporters and opponents, respectively, of the great revival meetings and the fervent preaching that accompanied them. Dickinson was a moderate "New Sider", supporting the revivals while opposing their more violent excess.

His pulpit oratory was centered on "temperance and harmony" and "devoid of antagonizing divisions, but which at the same time was appealing and innovative". In 1738, Dickinson joined with other "New Siders" to form the Presbytery of New York. When the Presbytery of New Brunswick was expelled from the Synod of Philadelphia over its support for the more extreme "New Siders" in 1741, Dickinson and others tried to negotiate a reconciliation. In 1745 the Presbytery of New York withdrew from the Synod of Philadelphia and joined with the Presbytery of New Brunswick to form the Synod of New York. Dickinson was elected the first moderator of the new synod. In general, Dickinson "longed for an experimental and vital religion but not at the expense of social and religious order".

== Founding of Princeton University ==
Dickinson had long been interested in starting a new college to serve the middle colonies. When he saw that the existing colleges in New England were hostile to the "New Siders", he returned to the project of establishing a college. Dickinson and three other pastors (Ebenezer Pemberton of the Old South Church, grandfather of Ebenezer Pemberton (1746-1835), Aaron Burr Sr., and John Pierson) enlisted the support of three laymen (William Smith, Peter Van Brugh Livingston, and William Peartree Smith). Led by Dickinson, this group of seven applied to Governor Lewis Morris for a charter. However, the governor rejected their application because he was an Anglican who opposed the Great Awakening. Following the death of Morris, they re-applied to Acting Governor John Hamilton, who granted a charter on October 22, 1746.

The first trustees, including five Log College adherents enlisted by Dickinson and Pemberton, announced Dickinson's appointment as the first President of Princeton University in April 1747. Classes began the fourth week in May in the parsonage of Dickinson's church in Elizabethtown, with a student body of eight or ten members. Less than five months later, on October 7, 1747, Jonathan Dickinson died suddenly, due to complications related to smallpox.

Academic offices
Preceded by none	President of the College of New Jersey; 1747	Succeeded by Aaron Burr Sr.
