= Adopting Act of 1729 =

The Adopting Act of 1729 was an act of the Synod of Philadelphia that made the Westminster Standards, particularly the Westminster Confession of Faith, the official confessional statements for Presbyterian churches in colonial America. Presbyterian ministers were required to believe or "subscribe" to the "essential and necessary" parts of the standards, but defining what was essential and necessary was left to individual presbyteries to determine.

The act was a compromise between Scotch-Irish ministers, who preferred unqualified subscription to the confessions in order to maintain Reformed theology, and the New Englanders, who preferred less hierarchical church government and believed that requiring subscription violated the principle of sola scriptura.

The Adopting Act is significant to the development of Presbyterianism in the United States. Continued controversy over the meaning of subscription and interpretation of the Westminster Standards led first to the Old Side–New Side Controversy and later the Old School–New School Controversy. In the 19th and 20th centuries, the language of the Adopting Act would be used to justify increasingly broad interpretations of the standards.

== Subscription controversy ==
A controversy over whether ministers must subscribe (affirm) the Westminster Confession of Faith had preoccupied Presbyterians in Scotland, Ireland and England for some time. In America, the Synod of Philadelphia initially had no official confessional statement, as American leaders tried to maintain unity and avoid division. By the 1720s, however, a number of factors forced the synod to consider codifying its theology and polity. The question of subscription was initially raised in reaction to the synod's lenient treatment of Robert Cross, a young pastor from New Castle Presbytery found guilty of fornication in 1720. Other issues included instances of clerical sleeping during worship and disputes between ministers and their congregations in New York.

In 1724, New Castle Presbytery began requiring its ministerial candidates to affirm the statement, "I do own the Westminster Confession as the Confession of my faith." A synod-wide requirement to subscribe to the Westminster Standards was first proposed in 1727 by John Thomson of New Castle Presbytery and was supported by Presbyterians with Scotch-Irish and Scottish backgrounds. Thomson argued that the theology contained in the Westminster Standards, though not the document itself, had scriptural authority. The Scotch-Irish were convinced, based on their experience in the Old World, that refusal to subscribe tended to be the first step toward Arminianism and other beliefs that were incompatible with Calvinism. They believed strict adherence to the Westminster Standards was the best way to prevent such deviation.

Presbyterians from New England, led by Jonathan Dickinson, opposed the idea on the grounds that requiring subscription would deny the sufficiency of the Bible in matters of faith and life and effectively elevate a human interpretation of scripture to the same level of scripture. Dickinson preferred that the Bible be affirmed as the common standard for faith and practice. Rather than scrutinizing the beliefs of ministerial candidates, Dickinson thought it would be more helpful to examine their personal religious experience.

Ethnic and cultural tensions fed the controversy because New Englanders also felt that the Scottish and Scotch-Irish clergy were attempting a takeover of the synod. The Scotch-Irish party outnumbered the New Englanders, and the number of Scotch-Irish ministers and churches only increased over time as immigration continued. Some New Englanders accused their opponents of using subscription to purge the synod of English Puritanism.

== Enactment ==
In 1729, the synod reached a compromise with passage of the Adopting Act, which was likely composed by Dickinson and modeled on the Synod of Ulster's Pacific Act of 1720. The act required all ministers to declare "agreement in and approbation of" the Westminster Confession and Larger and Shorter Catechisms as being "in all the essential and necessary articles, good forms of sound words and systems of Christian doctrine." This language distinguished between the essential and nonessential parts of the standards. A minister who did not accept any particular part of the confession or catechisms could declare any scruples to his presbytery or the synod, which would then decide if the minister's scruples involved "essential and necessary articles of faith".

The synod also clarified its understanding of chapters 20 and 23 of the Westminster Confession, which dealt with the relationship between church and state. The synod affirmed their belief in religious liberty and the independence of the church from government interference, declaring that it did "not receive those articles in any such sense as to suppose the civil magistrate hath a controlling power over Synods with respect to the exercise of their ministerial authority; or power to persecute any for their religion".

The Adopting Act was unanimously approved on September 19, 1729. After passage, the act was put into effect, and ministers were invited to state scruples. No one offered any disqualifying objection. While imperfect, this compromise held American Presbyterianism together until the First Great Awakening revived old disputes in the Old Side–New Side Controversy.

== Legacy ==
According to church historian Lefferts A. Loetscher, the Adopting Act became "a kind of Magna Charta [sic] in the Church's theological history", while also formally tying that theology to the Westminster Standards. Nevertheless, the ambiguity surrounding the meaning of "essential and necessary articles" would lead to further controversy in later years as the range of alternative interpretations continued to expand.

When the Philadelphia Synod re-organized itself into the national Presbyterian Church in the United States of America in 1789, it adopted a new formula for ordination. Ministerial candidates were asked, "Do you sincerely receive and adopt, the confession of faith of this church, as containing the system of doctrine taught in the holy Scriptures?" The phrase "system of doctrine" was widely interpreted in the spirit of the Adopting Act. Therefore, a minister was required to accept only those parts of the Westminster Confession that are "essential and necessary" to the system of Reformed theology. In the 19th and 20th centuries, ministers began to interpret the confession in increasingly broad ways.

== Citations ==
=== References ===
- Balmer, Randall Herbert; Fitzmier, John R. (1994). The Presbyterians. Denominations in America. Vol. 5. Praeger. ISBN 0313260842.
- Bauman, Michael (September 1998). "Jonathan Dickinson and the Subscription Controversy" (PDF). Journal of the Evangelical Theological Society. 41 (3): 455–467. Archived from the original (PDF) on 2011-12-01.
- Fortson, S. Donald III (2007), "The Adopting Act Compromise", in Fortson, S. Donald III (ed.), Colonial Presbyterianism: Old Faith in a New Land, Princeton Theological Monograph Series, vol. 71, Pickwick Publications, pp. 63–86, ISBN 978-1630878641.
- Loetscher, Lefferts A. (1954). The Broadening Church: A Study of Theological Issues in the Presbyterian Church Since 1869. Philadelphia: University of Pennsylvania Press.
- Longfield, Bradley J. (2013). Presbyterians and American Culture: A History. Louisville, Kentucky: Westminster Johh Knox Press. ISBN 9780664231569.
