= John Thomson (Presbyterian minister) =

Irish minister in the Presbytery of Philadelphia

- Born: 1690; County Armagh, Ireland
- Died: May 16, 1753 (aged 62–63); Anson County, Province of North Carolina, British America
- Burial place: Mooresville, North Carolina, U.S.
- Other name: John Thompson
- Education: University of Glasgow
- Occupations: Clergyman; writer; educator

John Thomson or Thompson (c. 1690–1753) was born in Ireland and became a minister in the Presbytery of Philadelphia, later the Synod of Philadelphia. He served as a missionary in both Virginia and North Carolina, where he died a natural death in 1753. He is buried in the cemetery of Centre Presbyterian Church in Mooresville, North Carolina.

== Life ==
John Thomson was born in 1690 in County Armagh, Ireland, of Scotch-Irish descent. He studied at the University of Glasgow in 1706. He was licensed by the Presbytery of Armagh on June 23, 1713. He came to America and was ordained by the still fledgling Presbytery of Philadelphia in 1717. He was a minister at the Lewes, Delaware, Presbyterian Church. He served that congregation until 1729. He was elected as Moderator of the New Castle Presbytery in 1718, and Moderator of the Synod of Philadelphia in 1719 and again in 1722. Thomson then served as the pastor for Middle Octorara from 1730 to 1733 when he left because the congregation had difficulty paying him. He received a call to Chestnut Level, Pennsylvania where he served from 1733 to 1744. During the disruption caused in the church by the Great Awakening, John Thomson stayed with the Old Side Synod of Philadelphia as one who opposed the Awakening. Thomson then went to be a missionary and church planter in the backwoods of Virginia. He settled in Buffalo, Virginia in 1744 and ministered there until 1750. He then served as a missionary to North Carolina from 1751 until his death in 1753.

== Adopting Act ==
John Thomson is the primary author of the Adopting Act of 1729. This act requires that every candidate for the Presbyterian ministry subscribe to the Westminster Confession and Catechisms in all essential and necessary articles. Any scruples would be judged by the presbyteries to see if they were against essential and necessary articles. Rev. Thomson originally proposed requiring candidates subscribe to the Westminster Standards in 1727, but the Synod delayed acting on it. Not every minister was in favor of the adopting of the Westminster. Rev. Jonathon Dickenson published a work entitled, "Remarks on an Overture" where he criticized the idea of subscribing to man made standards and claimed it would not help protect that church from heresy. We know that other ministers such as Jedidiah Andrews also objected to the act. In 1729, Thomson's motion was brought up again and referred to a committee that included both Thomson and Dickenson. The Adopting Act was a compromise that required subscription to the Westminster, but allowed scruples to be judged by presbyteries. The Adopting Act was unanimously adopted and everyone then took an exception to the Westminster's teaching on the role of the civil magistrate. The decision was unanimously reaffirmed the next year in 1730.

== Old Side – New Side Controversy ==
The Old Side-New Side Controversy is the name for the split that occurred during the First Great Awakening in the Presbyterian Church. Sometimes this is lumped in with the Old Light – New Light Controversy, but this name is broader and usually refers to Congregationalists. John Thomson was a leader of the Old Lights. He opposed the revivalistic measures taken by fellow Presbyterian pastors such Gilbert Tennent. For his efforts he was often called ‘unconverted’ and received much abuse. In 1741, John Thomson along with several other ministers and elders signed a Protestation regarding the conduct of those who adhered to the New Side or the pro-Awakening side. A vote ensued regarding the Protest and the Protestors came out in the majority and led to the withdrawal of the New Side brethren. They created their own Presbytery, the Conjunct Presbytery, and would later form the Synod of New York. John Thomson continued as a member of the Synod of Philadelphia.

Thomson would defend the Old Side position in print. He did this both officially and unofficially. He wrote "The Doctrine of Convictions Set in a Clear Light" in 1741. This book targeted the difference between the Old Side and the New Side with regards to how a person is convicted of sin and becomes a Christian. The New Side favored preaching the Terrors of the Law and asked for Conversion Narratives, but the Old Side opposed both. This book was denounced by Gilbert Tennent as a "detestable performance" and proof that Mr. Thomson was unconverted, and Samuel Finley, a New Side minister, wrote a formal rebuttal to it.

Thomson also co-wrote "An Examination and Refutation of Mr. Gilbert Tennent's Remarks Upon the Protestation." This was done with the approval of Synod along with several other members of the Synod of Philadelphia. It was designed to respond to the pamphlet written by Rev. Gilbert Tennent that criticized the actions of Synod. This was published in 1742.

Thomson went on to write another book regarding the controversy entitled, "Government of the Church of Christ." This work dealt with the New Side's views on the authority and government of the church. It specifically refutes the nameless charges delivered in two speeches at the 1740 Synod delivered by Gilbert Tennent and Rev. Samuel Blair. It also deals with the "Apology" published by many New Side ministers defending their actions. Thomson's work was published in 1741 and was finally answered by Rev. Blair in a work entitled, "A Vindication of the Brethren who were unjustly and illegally cast out of the Synod of Philadelphia" which was published in 1744.

Thomson would become a missionary first to Virginia and then to North Carolina; thus, he did not participate in Synod much after that. Late in Thomson's life the opposition to him by the New Side brethren apparently faded. Rev. Samuel Davies, a New Side minister in Virginia, spoke highly of Rev. Thomson, saying that he was even rejoicing to see the revival of religion in Virginia. Gilbert Tennent eventually commended his work on convictions, despite originally denouncing it in his attempts to reunite the two synods. Thomson would die before the two groups were reunited.

== Missionary Accomplishments ==
John Thomson went to North Carolina to preach to Presbyterians who were asking for a pastor to organize them in 1751. Among those asking for him to come were probably George Davidson and Thomson's son-in-law, Samuel Baker. Thomson would not return to Virginia dying in North Carolina in 1753. He went down as far as present day Iredell County in North Carolina. This would make him the first missionary of any denomination to reach that area. Thomson's intentions for going are apparently in debate. William Henry Foote believes Thomson was there only as a visiting pastor while others E.F. Rockwell thinks he was there to settle down permanently.

== Educational institutions ==
The Synod of Philadelphia created a school in 1743 under the leadership of Rev. Francis Allison that was the culmination of years of attempts that had never gotten fully off the ground. John Thomson had always been in favor of a school for young men. Thus, in 1744 when trustees were chosen for the school, John Thomson was placed on the original board. This school moved when it was taken over by Rev. Alexander McDowell, and was given a charter by New Jersey in 1769 as the Newark Academy. The original charter recognizes the original board including John Thomson. The Newark Academy would eventually become the University of Delaware.

John Thomson may have also contributed to the founding of Hampden-Sydney College in Virginia. Apparently while a missionary at the Buffalo Settlement in Virginia, he began a school for young men. Some argue that this is the school from which Hampden-Sydney sprang. John Thomson's son-in-law, Richard Sankey (sometimes written Zanchey) sat on the original board. This may give credence to the claims that John Thomson's efforts and school led to the founding of the college.

== Family ==
John Thomson was married twice and had several children;

- He was married in 1713 and the couple had 12 children, Esther, Mary, John, Abraham, Sarah, Roger, Jane, Ann, Margaret, Elizabeth and two others; his wife died in 1733.
- He married Mary McKean Reid in 1735; they had one child, Hannah.

== Works ==
The following are known works by John Thomson

- The Adopting Act (1729)
- An Essay Upon the Faith of Assurance (1740)
- The Doctrine of Convictions Set in a Clear Light (1741)
- The Government of the Church of Christ (1741)
- An Examination and Refutation of Mr. Tennent's Remarks Upon A Protestation (1742)
- An Explication of the Shorter Catechism (1749)

One anonymous work is now usually credited to John Thomson (referenced in his Explication of the Shorter Catechism [1749: 171]):

- The Poor Orphans Legacy (1734)
