= Zebulon Crocker =

Zebulon Crocker (March 8, 1802 – November 18, 1847) was a Congregationalist pastor and educator. He is best known for his published account of the 1837-38 schism of the Presbyterian Church in the United States of America entitled The Catastrophe of the Presbyterian Church.

== Biography ==
The son of Zebulon, Sr. and Sarah Crocker, Zebulon Crocker was born and raised on a farm in Wellington, Connecticut. A strong student and educator, he taught in the vicinity of his hometown before entering Yale Divinity School, an opportunity that was intermittently interrupted by periods of serving as an instructor of the Ellington School of Mr. John Hall. Crocker graduated from Yale in 1831.

After graduating from Yale, Crocker taught mathematics for a short time at the Ellington School before he was licensed to preach by the Hartford South Association of Ministers. Crocker then accepted a call to serve the Congregational Church in Middletown Upper Houses, now Cromwell. Ordained and installed there on May 2, 1833, Crocker remained at the Church, until his death in 1847.

Crocker married Elizabeth Porter. They had no children.

Crocker served as a delegate from the General Association of Connecticut to the General Assembly of the Presbyterian Church in 1837, the infamous assembly at which five synods of the Presbyterian Church were exscinded, constituting a major schism. The following year, he published a 300-page historical account of the schism, The Catastrophe of the Presbyterian Church, in which Crocker discussed the controversies had led to excision of the synods.

Citing the debate over the institution of slavery in America as a secondary cause of schism, Crocker focused on the relationship between New England Congregationalists and Southern Presbyterians, a relationship that had been formalized in the 1801 Plan of Union. The plan, largely designed to facilitate western expansion and evangelism in both the Congregational and Presbyterian churches, had prompted much controversy over a number of social, political, confessional, and theological matters. Crocker's account, in many ways a defense of New England and New Haven position, also argues for the effectiveness of the plan for "Those that were organized under it, from the Hudson to the Mississippi, (who) appreciated its blessings." He claimed that "not a murmur of complaint was uttered against it by those who had seen its operations, and experienced its effects."

Crocker noted three main reasons for the 1837 abrogation of the Plan of Union. First, it was unconstitutional since the General Assembly in 1801 had no right to "form these important standing rules without the approbation of a majority of the presbyteries." Second, that the General Association of Connecticut had no authority to act as a party in the agreement. Third, that "much confusion and irregularity have arisen from this unnatural and unconstitutional system of union." Elucidating upon this final reason, Crocker notes ten specifications that ultimately demonstrate why the Plan of Union, according to the General Assembly of 1837, "has had the slow but inevitable effect to subvert the order and discipline of the Presbyterian Church."

Regarded as an authoritative account of the 1837-38 schism, Crocker's work was regarded as "valuable and lucid" by his contemporaries.
