= First Presbyterian Church (New Brunswick, New Jersey) =

Historic church in New Brunswick, New Jersey

Coordinates: 40.4910°N 74.4463°W

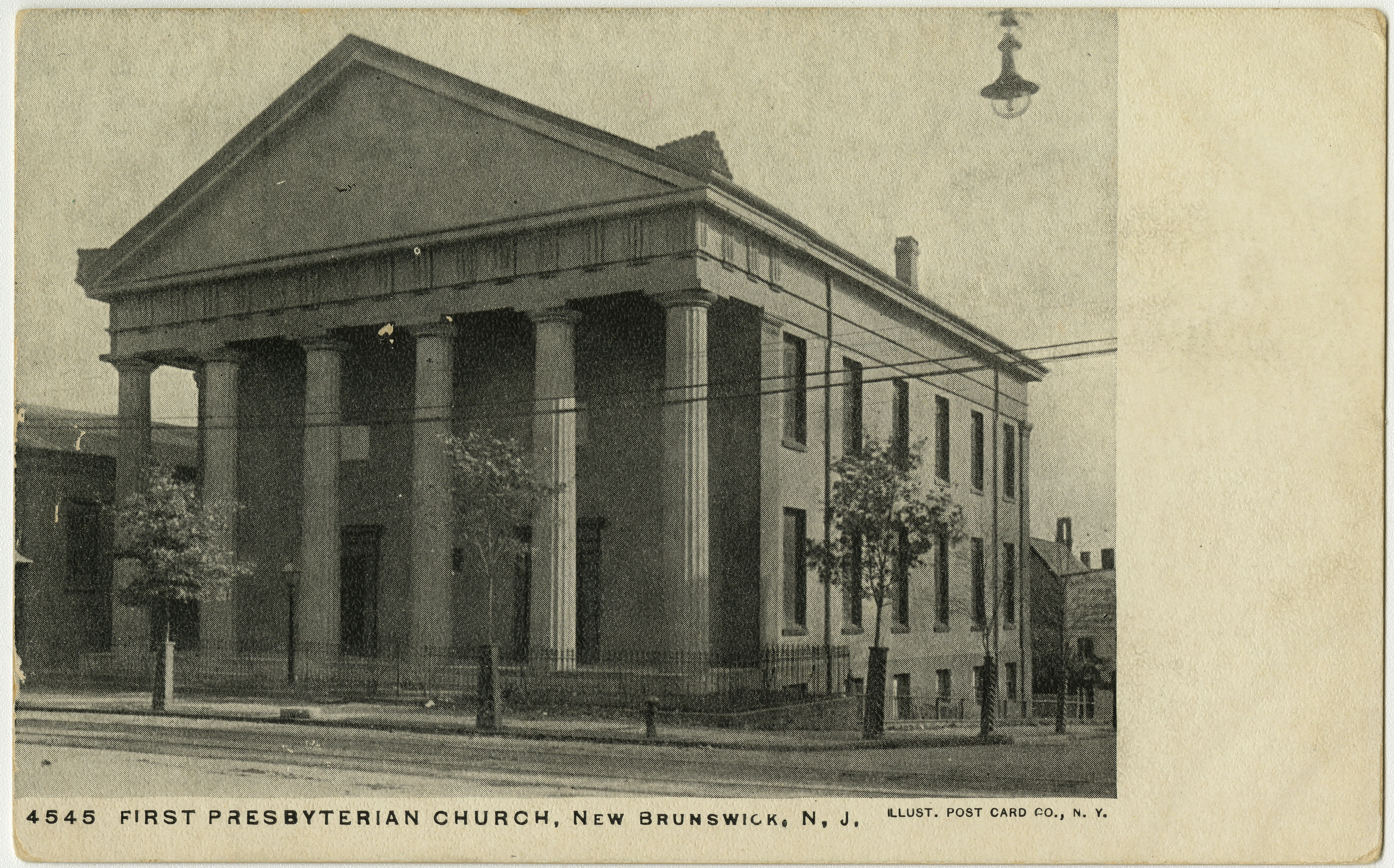
Church on a vintage postcard. This building burned down in 1947

The First Presbyterian Church and Cemetery in New Brunswick, New Jersey is one of the oldest churches in the Presbyterian denomination. It was the seat of the Presbytery of New Brunswick which is now located in Trenton, New Jersey.

== History ==
In 1738 the Presbytery of East Jersey was merged with the Presbytery of Long Island and renamed the Presbytery of New York, and two days after that, the Presbytery of New Brunswick was created.

In late 1726, or early 1727 Reverend Gilbert Tennent was ordained pastor of the congregation. The church records were destroyed or lost, during the American Revolution when British soldiers were quartered in the manse. The records of the First Presbyterian Church (Newark, New Jersey) were destroyed at the same time. Because of damage to the church from the war, a new building was set up to replace the damaged one.

In 1937 John Gresham Machen was condemned by the Presbytery of New Brunswick for disobeying higher authorities in a religious court hearing held in Trenton, New Jersey.

In 1947 a fire caused $147,000 in damages (equivalent to $2,070,000 in 2024).

Around 1966, Alfred Yorston removed 520 bodies from the church's cemetery to Van Liew Cemetery to make way for new construction at the church.

== Pastors ==
- Gilbert Tennent (1703-1764) 1726 to 1743.
- Thomas Arthur (minister) 1746 to 1751.
- Israel Reed 1768 to 1786.
- Walter Monteith 1786 to 1794.
- Joseph Clark (minister) 1797 to 1813.
- Levi J. F. Huntington 1815 to 1820.
- Samuel B. How 1821 to 1823.
- Joseph H. Jones 1821 to 1823.
- Robert Birch 1839 to 1842.
- Robert Davidson (minister) 1843 to ?.
- Howard Crosby (1826–1891) 1861-1862.
- William White Knox (1843-1929) circa 1900.
- Szabolcs S. G. Nagy 1977 to 2010.

== Notable burials ==
- John Bubenheim Bayard (1738-1807), mayor of New Brunswick, New Jersey.
