= Presbytery of New Brunswick =

- Predecessor: Presbytery of New York
- Successor: Coastlands Presbytery
- Formation: 1738
- Dissolved: 2021
- Type: Presbytery
- Headquarters: Ewing Township, New Jersey, U.S.
- Region served: Central New Jersey
- Parent organization: Synod of the Northeast
- Website: web.archive.org/web/20160819023713/http://www.presnb.org/

The former Presbytery of New Brunswick is now part of the Coastlands Presbytery as of March 1, 2021

The Presbytery of New Brunswick was a presbytery of the Presbyterian Church (USA). In 1738 the Presbytery of East Jersey was merged with the Presbytery of Long Island and renamed the Presbytery of New York, and two days after that, the Presbytery of New Brunswick was created. Its seat was First Presbyterian Church (New Brunswick, New Jersey), where Gilbert Tennent was pastor. In 1741, the presbytery was excluded from its parent body, the Synod of Philadelphia, in the beginning of the Old Side–New Side Controversy. The presbytery, along with the newly formed London Derry Presbytery, became known as the "New Side", while those who remained in the Presbytery of Philadelphia were known as the "Old Side". The Synod of New York was established in 1745 for the New Side presbyteries. In 1751, the Presbytery of New Brunswick was divided, with the churches in Pennsylvania and South Jersey constituting the Presbytery of Abington.
