= Old Side–New Side controversy =

American Presbyterian church controversy

The Old Side–New Side controversy occurred within the Presbyterian Church in Colonial America and was part of the wider theological controversy surrounding the First Great Awakening. It centered around the requirement for church office-bearers to subscribe to the church's confession of faith. The Old and New Side Presbyterians existed as separate churches from 1741 until 1758. The name of Old Side–New Side is usually meant as specifically referring to the Presbyterian Church. When one is referring to the debate as a whole, Old and New Light is usually used.

== History ==
=== Background: Presbyterianism in the American colonies to 1741 ===
In 1717, Presbyterians in the American colonies created the Synod of Philadelphia, which was subdivided into the Philadelphia Presbytery, the Long Island Presbytery, and the New Castle Presbytery. The synod and presbyteries provided oversight and discipline to ministers and churches, and they also ordained ministers. Early on, American Presbyterians were divided by both ethnicity and religious outlook. Some of the members had Scots-Irish and Scottish backgrounds, while others came from New England. The Scots-Irish party stressed a dogmatic adherence to confessional standards, professional ministry, and the orderly and authoritarian nature of church government. The New England party emphasized "spontaneity, vital impulse, adaptability" and experiential piety.

A dispute between these two groups over whether the synod should require ministers to affirm the Westminster Confession led to the subscription controversy of the 1720s. The Scots-Irish or subscription party believed that subscription would preserve Reformed orthodoxy from the threat of rationalistic ideas. The New England or anti-subscription party preferred declaring the Bible to be the common standard for faith and practice. Rather than scrutinizing the beliefs of ministerial candidates, the anti-subscriptionists thought it would be more helpful to examine their personal religious experience. The impasse was resolved with passage of the Adopting Act of 1729. The Adopting Act was a compromise that required affirmation or "subscription" only for those parts of the confession considered "essential" to the faith. This compromise maintained peace between the two groups for several years until the First Great Awakening initiated a new round of conflict.

=== Years of schism, 1742–1758 ===
For the next several years the Conjunct Presbytery and the Synod of Philadelphia battled in print and over reuniting, with the Presbytery of New York standing in the middle. The Presbytery of New York generally favored the revival, but had doubts about some of the extreme and disorderly actions. Finally, in 1746, the Presbytery of New York left the Synod of Philadelphia and joined the New Side. The Conjunct Presbytery then became the Synod of New York while the Old Side ministers continued as the Synod of Philadelphia.

=== 1758 reunification and legacy of the controversy ===
The factions of the Old Side and New Side did not die down. The Synod of New York had 72 ministers in 1758 when it merged with the Synod of Philadelphia, which had only a little over twenty. Thus, the New Side doctrine was imposed upon the Presbyteries and became the rule of the Synod. By 1762 disagreement over the plan of union and examination of candidates for the ministry had erupted at synod. The Old Side did not inquire into the candidate's experience to determine his acquaintance with religion, and the New Side minister had done so. The synod decided to leave it up to each presbytery on whether or not to question candidates in such a manner. That year they also created a Second Presbytery of Philadelphia, which was clearly done on a theological split, not a geographical one. In 1765 the Old Side controlled Presbytery of Donegal was split into multiple presbyteries. On account of this perceived violation of their rights and the Plan of Union, the Old Side members of the Presbytery of Donegal withdrew from Synod and Revs. John Ewing and Alexander McDowell, both Old Side ministers, protested the decision of synod to split Donegal. In the end, the outbreak of the Revolutionary War took center stage and by the end of the war the Synod of New York and Philadelphia dissolved and in 1788 the first General Assembly was formed.

The New Hampshire town of Derry seceded in 1827 from its western neighbour, Londonderry, using the boundary that had resulted from the split into east and west parishes during the controversy.

== Differences ==
Points four through seven all deal with consequences of having a different understanding of the Doctrine of Convictions. The Old Side ministers accused the New Side ministers of rashly condemning other Presbyterian ministers as unconverted (point four), of teaching that regularly ordained ministers could do no spiritual good if they were unconverted (point five), of preaching the 'terrors of the law' (point six), and of requiring a conversion narrative and being able to judge the gracious state of an individual by that narrative (point seven). The New Side condemned the Old Side for not requiring narratives or preaching the terrors of the law. Gilbert Tennent at least believed that some ministers were unconverted and that people should not sit under the ministry of an unconverted minister. This comes from his famous sermon, "Dangers of an Unconverted Ministry".

== Views today ==
There are many different view points on the Old Side–New Side conflict today. Historian Joseph Tracy held that the Old Side was saved from drifting into "the dead sea of Arminian inefficiency, and the bottomless gulf of Unitarianism" by reuniting with the New Side in 1758. Others think that there were no doctrinal divisions between the two parties, just ones of methodology.

== Citations ==
=== References ===
- Balmer, Randall Herbert; Fitzmier, John R. (1994). The Presbyterians. Denominations in America. Vol. 5. Praeger. ISBN 0313260842.
- Loetscher, Lefferts A. (1954). The Broadening Church: A Study of Theological Issues in the Presbyterian Church Since 1869. Philadelphia: University of Pennsylvania Press.
- Longfield, Bradley J. (2013). Presbyterians and American Culture: A History. Louisville, Kentucky: Westminster Johh Knox Press. ISBN 9780664231569.
- Smith, Morton H. (1962). Studies in Southern Presbyterian Theology. Phillipsburg, New Jersey: Presbyterian and Reformed Publishing.
- Webster, Richard (1857). A History of the Presbyterian Church in America: From Its Origin Until the Year 1760, with Biographical Sketches of Its Early Ministers. Philadelphia: Joseph M. Wilson on behalf of the Presbyterian Historical Society. ISBN 9780524013380.
