= Presbyterian Church in the United States of America =

Historical Presbyterian organization

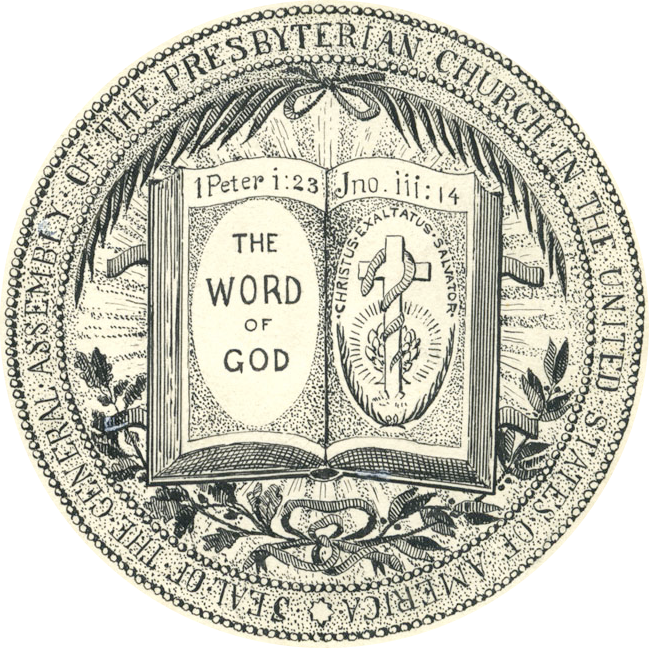
- Seal of the General Assembly of PCUSA
- Classification: Protestant
- Orientation: Mainline Reformed
- Polity: Presbyterian polity
- Associations: Plan of Union with the Congregational churches of New England (1801–1837); United Foreign and Domestic Missionary Societies (with the Reformed Church in America and the Associate Reformed Church, 1817–1826); American Home Missionary Society (1826); Federal Council of Churches (1908); Interchurch World Movement (1918–1920); United Andean Indian Mission (1946)
- Origin: 1789; Philadelphia, Pennsylvania
- Branched from: Church of Scotland and Synod of Ulster
- Separations: Springfield Presbytery (1803); Cumberland Presbyterian Church (1810, reunited in part 1906); New School Presbyterians (1838; reunited 1869); Presbyterian Church in the United States (1861); Orthodox Presbyterian Church (1936)
- Merged into: United Presbyterian Church in the United States of America (1958)
- Congregations: 8,351 in 1957
- Members: 2.8 million in 1957
- Ministers: 10,261 in 1957

The Presbyterian Church in the United States of America (PCUSA) was a Presbyterian denomination existing from 1789 to 1958. In that year, the PCUSA merged with the United Presbyterian Church of North America. The new church was named the United Presbyterian Church in the United States of America. It was a predecessor to the contemporary Presbyterian Church (USA).

The denomination originated in colonial times when members of the Church of Scotland and Presbyterians from Ireland first immigrated to America. After the American Revolution, the PCUSA was organized in Philadelphia to provide national leadership for Presbyterians in the new nation. In 1861, Presbyterians in the Southern United States split from the denomination because of disputes over slavery, politics, and theology precipitated by the American Civil War. They established the Presbyterian Church in the United States, often called the "Southern Presbyterian Church". The PCUSA, in turn, was described as the Northern Presbyterian Church. Despite the PCUSA's designation as a "Northern church", it was once again a national denomination in its later years.

Over time, traditional Calvinism played less of a role in shaping the church's doctrines and practices—it was influenced by Arminianism and revivalism early in the 19th century, liberal theology late in the 19th century, and neo-orthodoxy by the mid-20th century. The theological tensions within the denomination were played out in the Fundamentalist–Modernist Controversy of the 1920s and 1930s, a conflict that led to the development of Christian fundamentalism and has historical importance to modern American evangelicalism. Conservatives dissatisfied with liberal trends left to form the Orthodox Presbyterian Church in 1936.

== History ==
=== Colonial era ===
==== Early organization efforts (1650–1729) ====
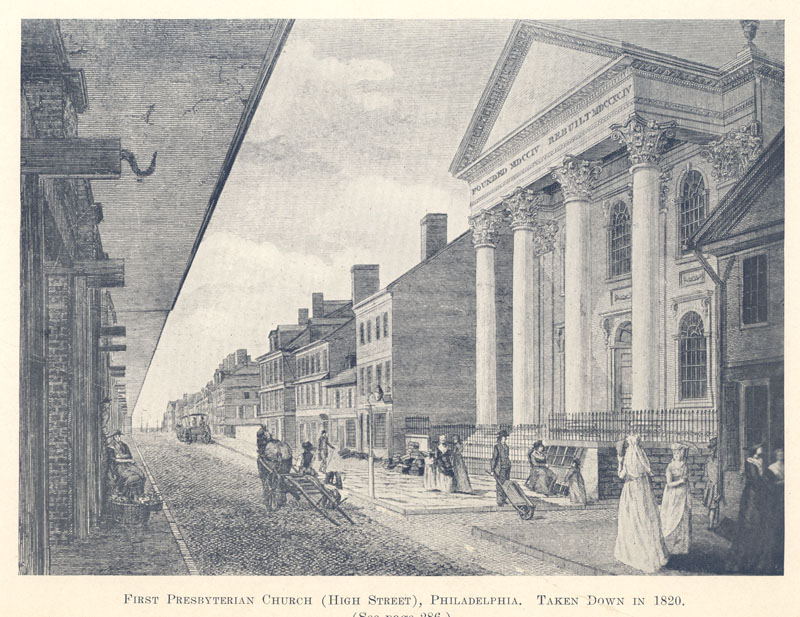
Illustration of the original First Presbyterian Church in Philadelphia located on High Street (now Market Street). First Presbyterian was the meeting place for both the first presbytery and first synod.

The origins of the Presbyterian Church is the Protestant Reformation of the 16th century. The writings of French theologian and lawyer John Calvin (1509–64) solidified much of the Reformed thinking that came before him in the form of the sermons and writings of Huldrych Zwingli. John Knox, a former Catholic priest from Scotland who studied with Calvin in Geneva, Switzerland, took Calvin's teachings back to Scotland and led the Scottish Reformation of 1560. As a result, the Church of Scotland embraced Reformed theology and presbyterian polity. The Ulster Scots brought their Presbyterian faith with them to Ireland, where they laid the foundation of what would become the Presbyterian Church of Ireland.

By the second half of the 17th century, Presbyterians were immigrating to British North America. Scottish and Scotch-Irish immigrants contributed to a strong Presbyterian presence in the Middle Colonies, particularly Philadelphia. Before 1706, however, Presbyterian congregations were not yet organized into presbyteries or synods.

In 1706, seven ministers led by Francis Makemie established the first presbytery in North America, the Presbytery of Philadelphia. The presbytery was primarily created to promote fellowship and discipline among its members and only gradually developed into a governing body. Initially, member congregations were located in New Jersey, Pennsylvania, Delaware, and Maryland. Further growth led to the creation of the Synod of Philadelphia (known as the "General Synod") in 1717. The synod's membership consisted of all ministers and one lay elder from every congregation.

The synod still had no official confessional statement. The Church of Scotland and the Synod of Ulster already required clergy to subscribe to the Westminster Confession. In 1729, the synod passed the Adopting Act, which required clergy to assent to the Westminster Confession and Larger and Shorter Catechisms. However, subscription was only required for those parts of the Confession deemed an "essential and necessary article of faith". Ministers could declare any scruples to their presbytery or the synod, which would then decide if the minister's views were acceptable. While crafted as a compromise, the Adopting Act was opposed by those who favored strict adherence to the Confession.

==== Old Side–New Side Controversy (1730–1758) ====
During the 1730s and 1740s, the Presbyterian Church was divided over the impact of the First Great Awakening. Drawing from the Scotch-Irish revivalist tradition, evangelical ministers such as William and Gilbert Tennent emphasized the necessity of a conscious conversion experience and the need for higher moral standards among the clergy.

Other Presbyterians were concerned that revivalism presented a threat to church order. In particular, the practice of itinerant preaching across presbytery boundaries and the tendency of revivalists to doubt the conversion experiences of other ministers caused controversy between supporters of revivalism, known as the "New Side", and their conservative opponents, known as the "Old Side". While the Old Side and New Side disagreed over the possibility of immediate assurance of salvation, the controversy was not primarily theological. Both sides believed in justification by faith, predestination, and that regeneration occurred in stages.

In 1738, the synod moved to restrict itinerant preaching and to tighten educational requirements for ministers, actions the New Side resented. Tensions between the two sides continued to escalate until the Synod of May 1741, which ended with a definite split between the two factions. The Old Side retained control of the Synod of Philadelphia, and it immediately required unconditional subscription to the Westminster Confession with no option to state scruples. The New Side founded the Synod of New York. The new Synod required subscription to the Westminster Confession in accordance with the Adopting Act, but no college degrees were required for ordination.

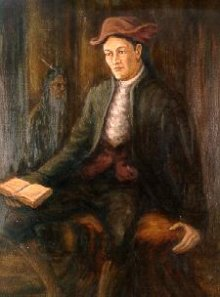
David Brainerd, missionary to the Native Americans

While the controversy raged, American Presbyterians were also concerned with expanding their influence. In 1740, a New York Board of the Society in Scotland for the Propagation of Christian Knowledge was established. Four years later, David Brainerd was assigned as a missionary to the Native Americans. New Side Presbyterians were responsible for founding Princeton University (originally the College of New Jersey) primarily to train ministers in 1746.

By 1758, both sides were ready for reconciliation. Over the years, New Side revivalism had become less radical. At the same time, Old Side Presbyterians were experiencing numerical decline and were eager to share in the New Side's vitality and growth. The two synods merged to become the Synod of New York and Philadelphia. The united Synod was founded on New Side terms: subscription according to the terms of the Adopting Act; presbyteries were responsible for examining and licensing ordination candidates; candidates were to be examined for learning, orthodoxy and their "experimental acquaintance with religion" (i.e. their personal conversion experiences); and revivals were acknowledged as a work of God.

=== American Independence (1770–1789) ===
In the early 1770s, American Presbyterians were initially reluctant to support American Independence, but in time many Presbyterians came to support the Revolutionary War. After the Battles of Lexington and Concord, the Synod of New York and Philadelphia published a letter in May 1775 urging Presbyterians to support the Second Continental Congress while remaining loyal to George III. In one sermon, John Witherspoon, president of Princeton, preached "that the cause in which America is now in arms, is the cause of justice, of liberty, and of human nature". Witherspoon and 11 other Presbyterians were signatories to the Declaration of Independence.

Even before the war, many Presbyterian felt that the single synod system was no longer adequate to meet the needs of a numerically and geographically expanding church. All clergy were supposed to attend annual meetings of the synod, but some years attendance was less than thirty percent. In 1785, a proposal for the creation of a General Assembly went before the synod, and a special committee was formed to draw up a plan of government.

Under the plan, the old synod was divided into four new synods all under the authority of the General Assembly. The synods were New York and New Jersey, Philadelphia, Virginia, and the Carolinas. Compared to the Church of Scotland, the plan gave presbyteries more power and autonomy. Synods and the General Assembly were to be "agencies for unifying the life of the Church, considering appeals, and promoting the general welfare of the Church as a whole." The plan included provisions from the Church of Scotland's Barrier Act of 1697, which required the General Assembly to receive the approval of a majority of presbyteries before making major changes to the church's constitution and doctrine. The constitution included the Westminster Confession of Faith, together with the Larger and Shorter Catechisms, as the church's subordinate standard (i.e. subordinate to the Bible) in addition to the (substantially altered) Westminster Directory. The Westminster Confession was modified to bring its teaching on civil government in line with American practices.

In 1787, the plan was sent to the presbyteries for ratification. The synod held its last meeting in May 1788. The first General Assembly of the Presbyterian Church in the United States of America met in Philadelphia in May 1789. At that time, the church had four synods, 16 presbyteries, 177 ministers, 419 congregations and an estimated membership of 18,000.

=== 19th century ===
==== Interdenominational societies ====
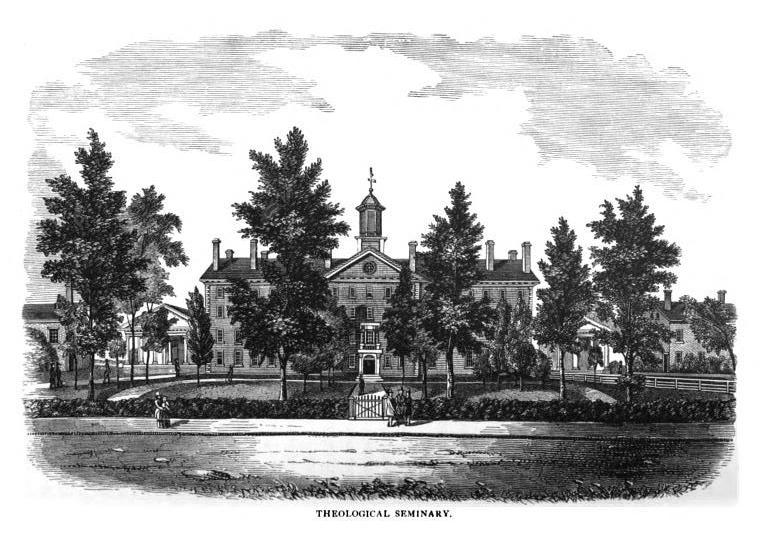
Princeton Theological Seminary in the 1800s

The late 18th and early 19th centuries saw Americans leaving the Eastern Seaboard to settle further inland. One of the results was that the PCUSA signed a Plan of Union with the Congregationalists of New England in 1801, which formalized cooperation between the two bodies and attempted to provide adequate visitation and preaching for frontier congregations, along with eliminating rivalry between the two denominations. The large growth rate of the Presbyterian Church in the Northeast was in part due to the adoption of Congregationalist settlers along the western frontier.

Not unlike the circuit riders in the Episcopal and Methodist traditions, the presbyteries often sent out licentiates to minister in multiple congregations that were spread out over a wide area. To meet the need for educated clergy, Princeton Theological Seminary and Union Presbyterian Seminary were founded in 1812, followed by Auburn Theological Seminary in 1821.

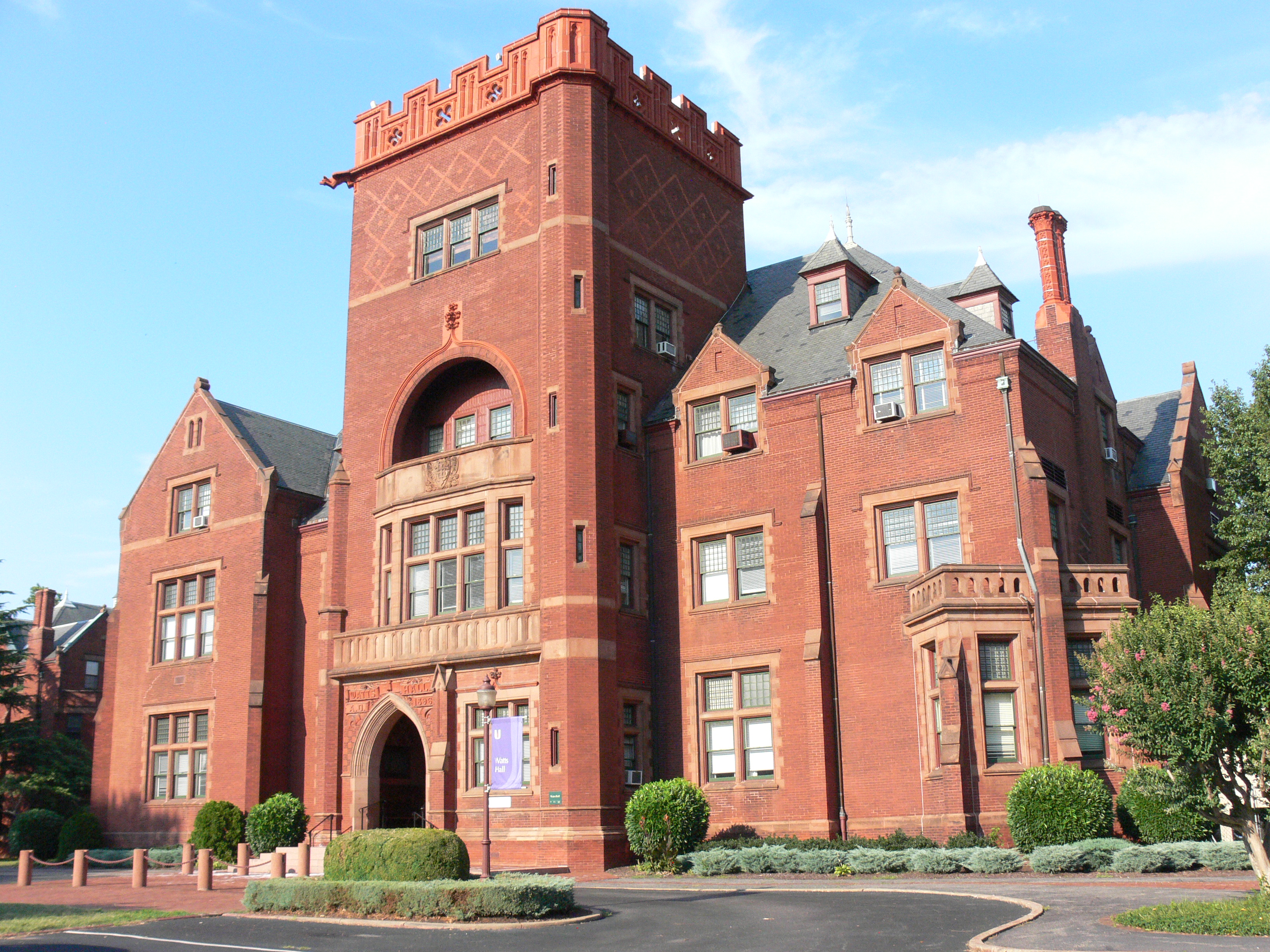
Watts Hall of Union Presbyterian Seminary

Growth in the Northeast was accompanied by the creation of moral reform organizations, such as Sunday schools, temperance associations, tract and Bible societies, and orphanages. The proliferation of voluntary organizations was encouraged by postmillennialism, the belief that the Second Coming of Christ would occur at the end of an era of peace and prosperity fostered by human effort. The 1815 General Assembly recommended the creation of societies to promote morality. Organizations such as the American Bible Society, the American Sunday School Union, and the American Colonization Society, while theoretically interdenominational, were dominated by Presbyterians and considered unofficial agencies of the Presbyterian Church.

The support of missionary work was also a priority in the 19th century. The first General Assembly requested that each of the four synods appoint and support two missionaries. Presbyterians took leading roles in creating early local and independent mission societies, including the New York Missionary Society (1796), the Northern Berkshire and Columbia Missionary Societies (1797), the Missionary Society of Connecticut (1798), the Massachusetts Missionary Society (1799), and the Boston Female Society for Missionary Purposes (1800). The first denominational missions agency was the Standing Committee on Mission, which was created in 1802 to coordinate efforts with individual presbyteries and the European missionary societies. The work of the committee was expanded in 1816, becoming the Board of Missions.

In 1817, the General Assembly joined with two other Reformed denominations, the American branch of the Dutch Reformed Church (now the Reformed Church in America) and the Associate Reformed Church, to form the United Foreign Missionary Society. The United Society was particularly focused on work among Native Americans and inhabitants of Central and South America. These denominations also established a United Domestic Missionary Society to station missionaries within the United States.

In 1826, the Congregationalists joined these united efforts. The Congregational mission societies were merged with the United Domestic Missionary Society to become the American Home Missionary Society. The Congregational American Board of Commissioners for Foreign Missions (ABCFM) became the recognized missions agency of the General Assembly, and the United Foreign Missionary Society's operations were merged with the American Board. By 1831, the majority of board members and missionaries of the ABCFM were Presbyterians. As a result, most of the local churches established by the organization were Presbyterian.

==== Second Great Awakening ====
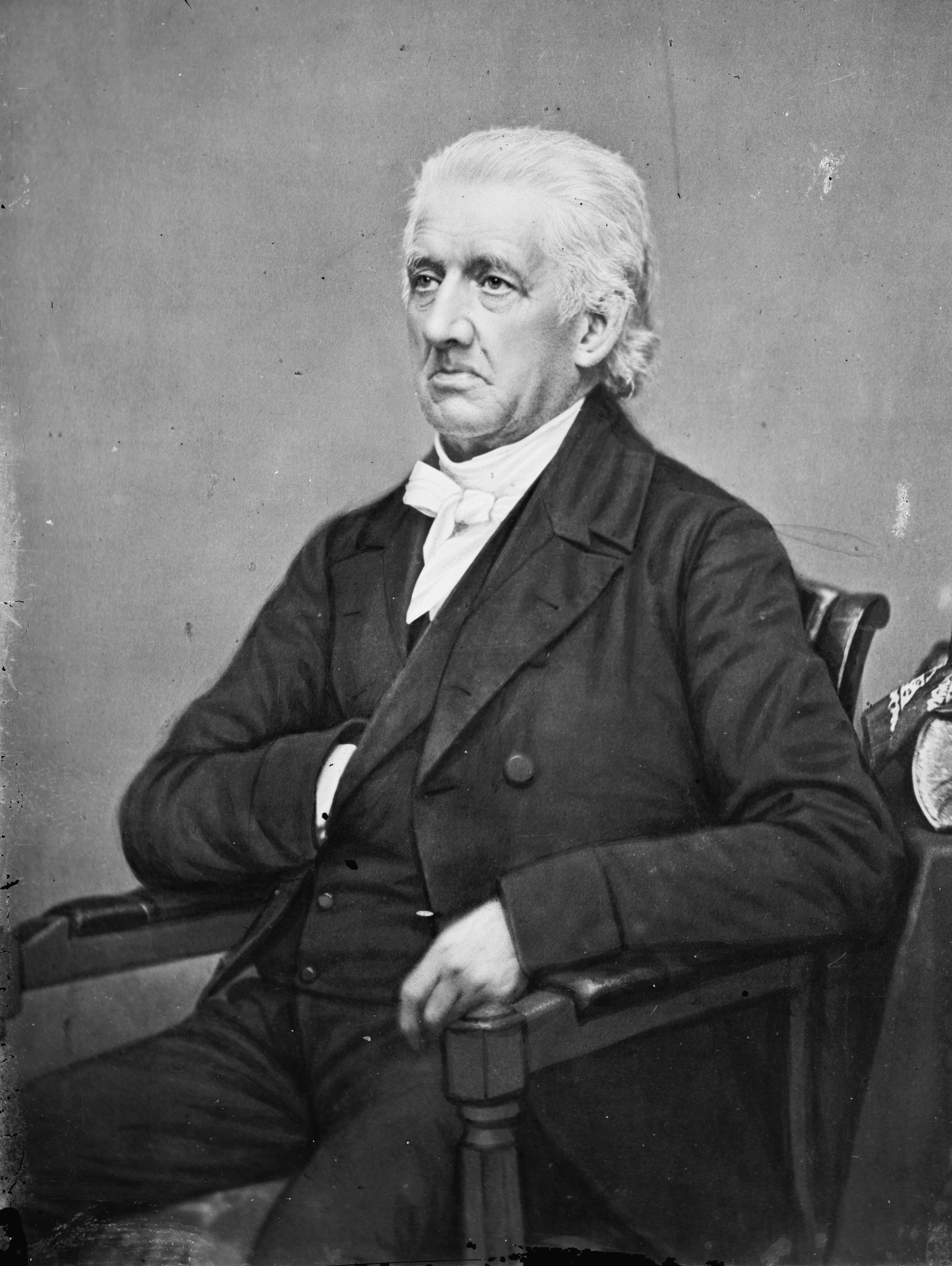
Lyman Beecher was a prominent Presbyterian revivalist and co-founder of the American Temperance Society.

Another major stimulus for growth was the Second Great Awakening (c. 1790 – 1840), which initially grew out of a 1787 student revival at Hampden–Sydney College, a Presbyterian institution in Virginia. From there, revivals spread to Presbyterian churches in Virginia and then to North Carolina and Kentucky. The Revival of 1800 was one such revival that first grew out of meetings led by Presbyterian minister James McGready. The most famous camp meeting of the Second Great Awakening, the Cane Ridge Revival in Kentucky, occurred during a traditional Scottish communion season under the leadership of local Presbyterian minister Barton W. Stone. Over 10 thousand people came to Cane Ridge to hear sermons from Presbyterian as well as Methodist and Baptist preachers.

Like the First Great Awakening, Presbyterian ministers were divided over their assessment of the fruits of the new wave of revivals. Many pointed to "excesses" displayed by some participants as signs that the revivals were theologically compromised, such as groans, laughter, convulsions and "jerks" (see religious ecstasy, holy laughter and slain in the Spirit). There was also concern over the tendency of revivalist ministers to advocate the free will teaching of Arminianism, thereby rejecting the Calvinist doctrines of predestination.

Facing charges of heresy for their Arminian beliefs, Presbyterian ministers Richard McNemar and John Thompson, along with Barton W. Stone and two other ministers, chose to withdraw from the Kentucky Synod and form the independent Springfield Presbytery in 1803. These ministers would later dissolve the Springfield Presbytery and become the founders of the American Restoration Movement, from which the Christian Church (Disciples of Christ) and Churches of Christ denominations originate.

Meanwhile, the Cumberland Presbytery, also within the Kentucky Synod, faced a shortage of ministers and decided to license clergy candidates who were less educated than was typical and who could not subscribe completely to the Westminster Confession. In 1805, the synod suspended many of these ministers, even bringing heresy charges against a number of them, and by 1806 the synod had dissolved the presbytery. In 1810, ministers dissatisfied with the actions of the synod formed the Cumberland Presbyterian Church (CPC). The CPC subscribed to a modified form of the Westminster Confession that rejected the Calvinist doctrines of double predestination and limited atonement.

Church growth in the Northeast was also accompanied by revivalism. While calmer and more reserved than those in the South, the revivals of the Second Great Awakening transformed religion in the Northeast, and they were often led by Presbyterians and Congregationalists. The Plan of Union led to the spread of New England theology (also known as the New Divinity and New Haven theology), originally conceived by Congregationalists. The New England theology modified and softened traditional Calvinism, rejecting the doctrine of imputation of Adam's sin, adopting the governmental theory of atonement, and embracing a greater emphasis on free will. It was essentially an attempt to construct a Calvinism conducive to revivalism. While the Synod of Philadelphia condemned the New Divinity as heretical in 1816, the General Assembly disagreed, concluding that New England theology did not conflict with the Westminster Confession.

==== Old School–New School Controversy ====
Notwithstanding the General Assembly's attempt to promote peace and unity, two distinct factions, the Old School and the New School, developed through the 1820s over the issues of confessional subscription, revivalism, and the spread of New England theology. The New School faction advocated revivalism and New England theology, while the Old School was opposed to the extremes of revivalism and desired strict conformity to the Westminster Confession. The ideological center of Old School Presbyterianism was Princeton Theological Seminary, which under the leadership of Archibald Alexander and Charles Hodge became associated with a brand of Reformed scholasticism known as Princeton Theology.

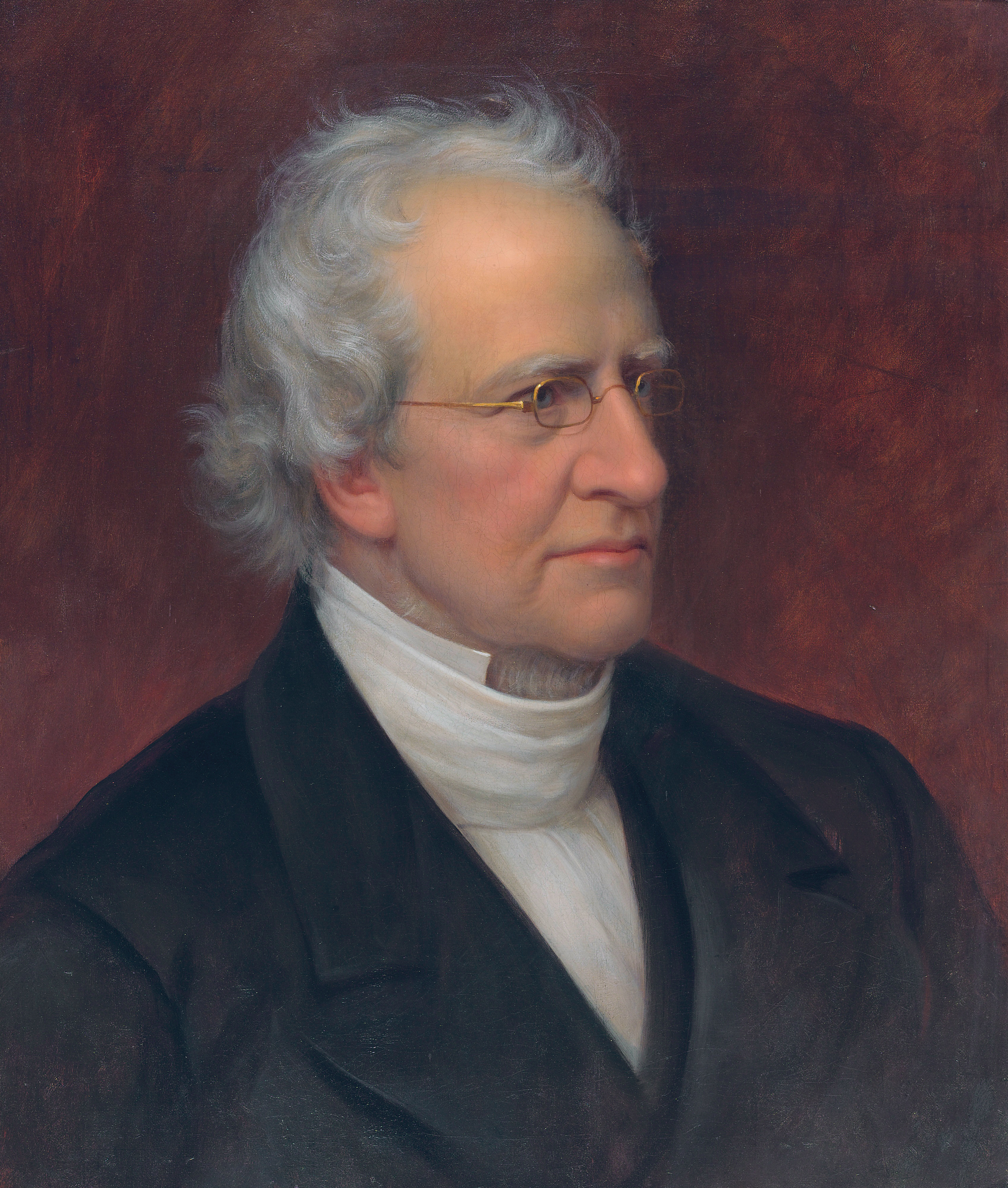
Portrait of Charles Hodge by Rembrandt Peale. Hodge was a leading proponent of the Princeton Theology.

Heresy trials of prominent New School leaders further deepened the division within the denomination. Both the Presbytery and Synod of Philadelphia found Albert Barnes, pastor of First Presbyterian Church in Philadelphia, guilty of heresy. Old School Presbyterians, however, were outraged when the New School dominated General Assembly of 1831 dismissed the charges. Lyman Beecher, famous revivalist, moral reformer and president of the newly established Lane Theological Seminary, was charged with heresy in 1835 but was also acquitted.

The most radical figure in the New School faction was prominent evangelist Charles Grandison Finney. Finney's revivals were characterized by his "New Measures", which included protracted meetings, extemporaneous preaching, the anxious bench, and prayer groups. Albert Baldwin Dod accused Finney of preaching Pelagianism and urged him to leave the Presbyterian Church. Finney did just that in 1836 when he joined the Congregational church as pastor of the Broadway Tabernacle in New York City.

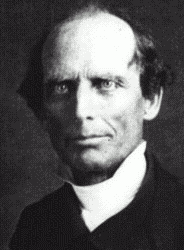
Charles Grandison Finney was a leader in the Second Great Awakening and a New School Presbyterian minister.

The Old School faction was convinced that the Plan of Union with the Congregational churches had undermined Presbyterian doctrine and order. At the 1837 General Assembly, the Old School majority successfully passed resolutions removing all judicatories found under the Plan from the Presbyterian Church. In total, three synods in New York and one synod in Ohio along with 28 presbyteries, 509 ministers, and 60 thousand church members (one-fifth of the PCUSA's membership) were excluded from the church. New School leaders reacted by meeting in Auburn, New York, and issuing the Auburn Declaration, a 16-point defense of their Calvinist orthodoxy.

When the General Assembly met in May 1838 at Philadelphia, the New School commissioners attempted to be seated but were forced to leave and convene their own General Assembly elsewhere in the city. The Old School and New School factions had finally split into two separate churches that were about equal in size. Both churches, however, claimed to be the Presbyterian Church in the USA. The Supreme Court of Pennsylvania decided that the Old School body was the legal successor of the undivided PCUSA.

==== Slavery dispute and Civil War division ====
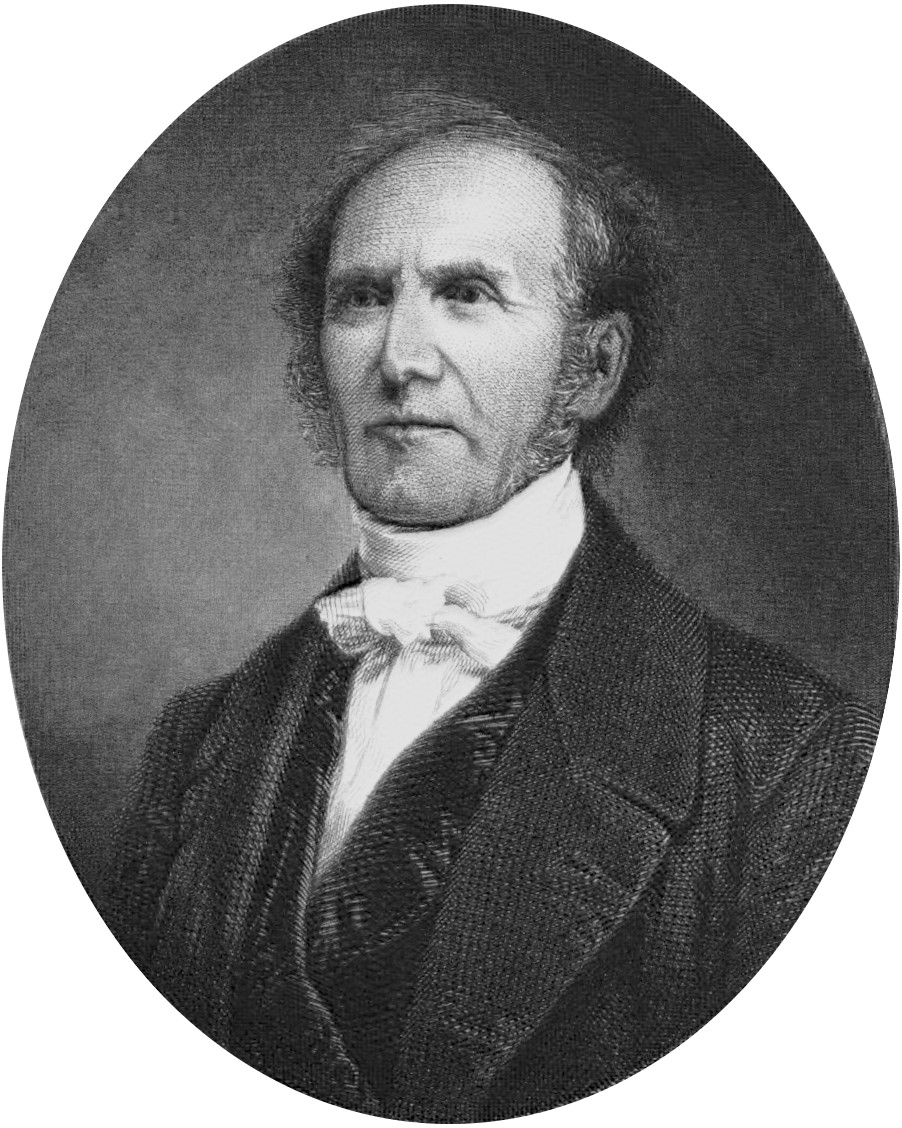
Portrait of Gardiner Spring, pastor of Brick Presbyterian Church and 55th Moderator of the General Assembly (Old School)

The Synod of Philadelphia and New York had expressed moderate abolitionist sentiments in 1787 when it recommended that all its members "use the most prudent measures consistent with the interests and state of civil society, in the countries where they live, to procure eventually the final abolition of slavery in America". At the same time, Presbyterians in the South were content to reinforce the status quo in their religious teaching, such as in "The Negro Catechism" written by North Carolina Presbyterian minister Henry Pattillo. In Pattillo's catechism, slaves were taught that their roles in life had been ordained by God.

In 1795, the General Assembly ruled that slaveholding was not grounds for excommunication but also expressed support for the eventual abolition of slavery. Later, the General Assembly called slavery "a gross violation of the most precious and sacred rights of human nature; as utterly inconsistent with the law of God". Nevertheless, in 1818, George Bourne, an abolitionist and Presbyterian minister serving in Virginia, was defrocked by his Southern presbytery in retaliation for his strong criticisms of Christian slaveholders. The General Assembly was increasingly reluctant to address the issue, preferring to take a moderate stance in the debate, but by the 1830s, tensions over slavery were increasing at the same time the church was dividing over the Old School–New School Controversy.

The conflict between Old School and New School factions merged with the slavery controversy. The New School's enthusiasm for moral reform and voluntary societies was evident in its increasing identification with the abolitionist movement. The Old School, however, was convinced that the General Assembly and the larger church should not legislate on moral issues that were not explicitly addressed in the Bible. This effectively drove the majority of Southern Presbyterians to support the Old School faction.

The first definitive split over slavery occurred within the New School Presbyterian Church. In 1858, Southern synods and presbyteries belonging to the New School withdrew and established the pro-slavery United Synod of the Presbyterian Church. Old School Presbyterians followed in 1861 after the start of hostilities in the American Civil War. In May, the Old School General Assembly passed the controversial Gardiner Spring Resolutions, which called for Presbyterians to support the Constitution and Federal Government of the United States.

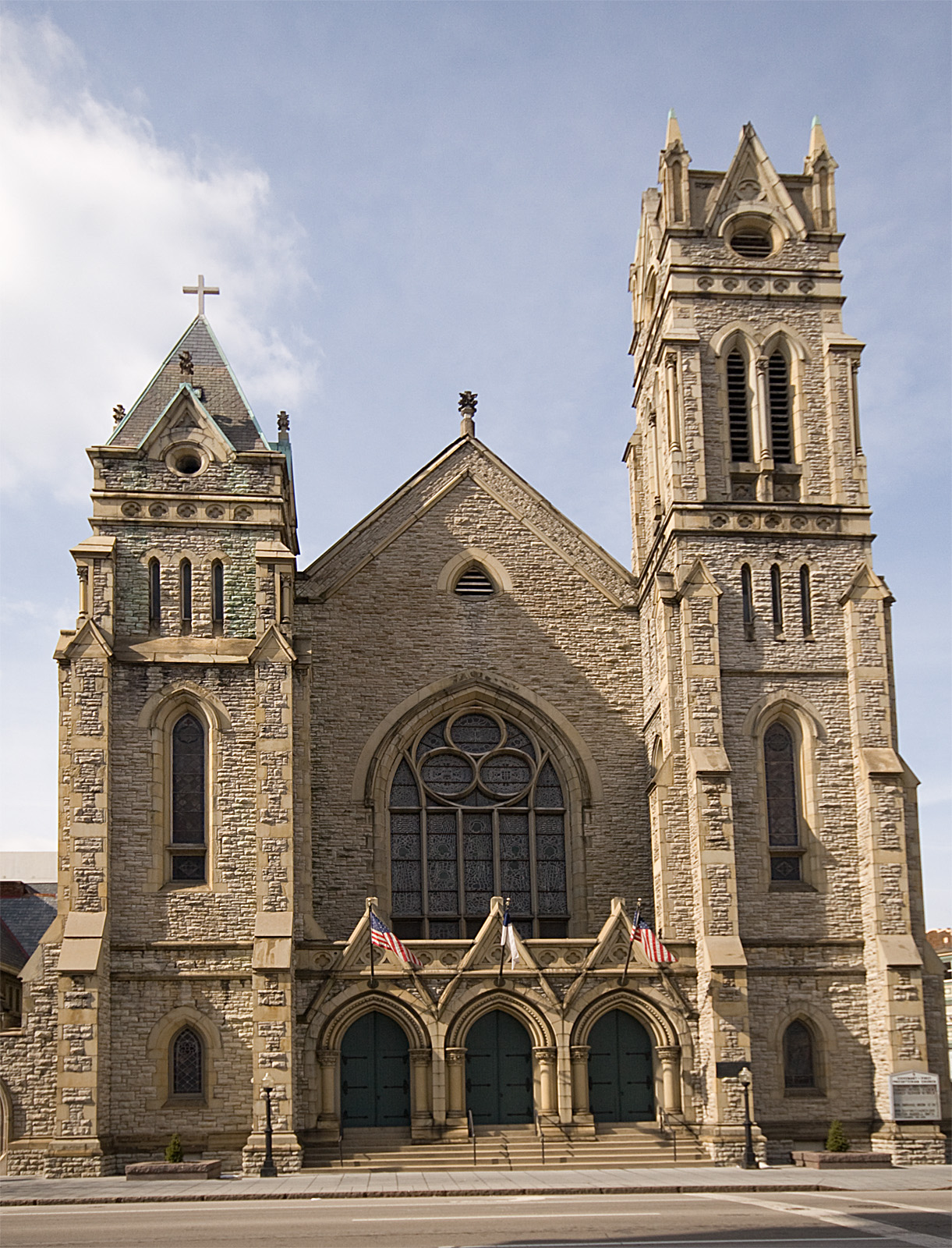
Covenant First Presbyterian Church in Cincinnati, Ohio, completed in 1875 as Second Presbyterian Church. Lyman Beecher served as pastor of Second Presbyterian from 1833 to 1843.

In response, representatives of Old School presbyteries in the South met in December at Augusta, Georgia, to form the Presbyterian Church in the Confederate States of America. The Presbyterian Church in the CSA absorbed the smaller United Synod in 1864. After the Confederacy's defeat in 1865, it was renamed the Presbyterian Church in the United States (PCUS) and was commonly nicknamed the "Southern Presbyterian Church" throughout its history, while the PCUSA was known as the "Northern Presbyterian Church".

==== Old School-New School reunion in the North ====
By the 1850s, New School Presbyterians in the North had moved to more moderate positions and reasserted a stronger Presbyterian identity. This was helped in 1852 when the Plan of Union between the New School Church and the Congregationalists was discontinued. Northern Presbyterians of both the Old and New School participated in the Christian Commission that provided religious and social services to Union soldiers during the Civil War. Furthermore, both schools boldly proclaimed the righteousness of the Union cause and engaged in speculation about the role of a newly restored America in ushering in the millennium. This was, in effect, the Old School's repudiation of its teaching against involving the church in political affairs.

A majority of Old School leaders in the North were convinced of the orthodoxy of the New School. Some within the Old School, chiefly Princeton theologian Charles Hodge, claimed that there were still ministers within the New School who adhered to New Haven theology. Nevertheless, the Old and New School General Assemblies in the North and a majority of their presbyteries approved the reunion in 1869 of the PCUSA.

==== Higher criticism and the Briggs heresy trial ====
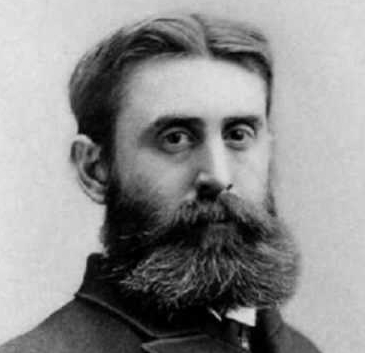
B. B. Warfield, principal of Princeton Theological Seminary from 1886 to 1921

In the decades after the reunion of 1869, conservatives expressed fear over the threat of "broad churchism" and modernist theology. Such fears were prompted in part by heresy trials (such as the 1874 acquittal of popular Chicago preacher David Swing) and a growing movement to revise the Westminster Confession. This liberal movement was opposed by Princeton theologians A. A. Hodge and B. B. Warfield.

While Darwinian evolution never became an issue for northern Presbyterians as most accommodated themselves to some form of theistic evolution, the new discipline of biblical interpretation known as higher criticism would become highly controversial. Utilizing comparative linguistics, archaeology, and literary analysis, German proponents of high criticism, such as Julius Wellhausen and David Friedrich Strauss, began questioning long-held assumptions about the Bible. At the forefront of the controversy in the PCUSA was Charles A. Briggs, a professor at PCUSA's Union Theological Seminary in New York.

While Briggs held to traditional Christian teaching in many areas, such as his belief in the virgin birth of Jesus, conservatives were alarmed by his assertion that doctrines were historical constructs that had to change over time. He did not believe that the Pentateuch was authored by Moses or that the book of Isaiah had a single author. In addition, he also denied that Biblical prophecy was a precise prediction of the future. In 1891, Briggs preached a sermon in which he claimed the Bible contained errors, a position many in the church considered contrary to the Westminster Confession's doctrines of verbal inspiration and Biblical inerrancy.

In response, 63 presbyteries petitioned the General Assembly to take action against Briggs. The 1891 General Assembly vetoed his appointment to Union Theological Seminary's chair of Biblical studies, and two years later Briggs was found guilty of heresy and suspended from the ministry. Ultimately, Union Theological Seminary refused to remove Briggs from his position and severed its ties to the Presbyterian Church.

In 1892, conservatives in the General Assembly were successful in adopting the Portland Deliverance, a statement named for the assembly's meeting place, Portland, Oregon. The Deliverance reasserted the church's belief in biblical inerrancy and required any minister who could not affirm the Bible as "the only infallible rule of faith and practice" to withdraw from the Presbyterian ministry. The Portland Deliverance would be used to convict Briggs of heresy.

=== 20th century ===
In the twentieth century, Presbyterian and Episcopalians tended to be wealthier and more educated (having more graduate and postgraduate degrees per capita) than most other religious groups in the United States, and were disproportionately represented in the upper reaches of American business, law, and politics.

The Boston Brahmins, who were regarded as the nation's social and cultural elites, were often associated with the American upper class, Harvard University; and the Episcopal and the Presbyterian Church. Old money in the United States was typically associated with White Anglo-Saxon Protestant ("WASP") status, particularly with the Episcopal and Presbyterian Church.

==== Confessional revision ====
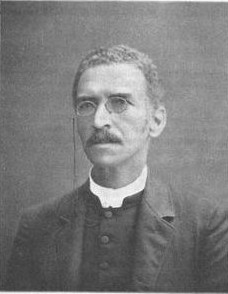
Presbyterian minister Francis James Grimké was a prominent supporter of equal rights for African Americans.

Briggs' heresy trial was a setback to the movement for confessional revision, which wanted to soften the Westminster Confession's Calvinistic doctrines of predestination and election. Nevertheless, overtures continued to come before the General Assembly. In 1903, two chapters on "The Holy Spirit" and "The Love of God and Missions" were added to the Confession and a reference to the pope being the anti-christ was deleted. Most objectionable to conservatives, a new "Declaratory Statement" was added to clarify the church's doctrine of election. Conservatives criticized the "Declaratory Statement" and claimed that it promoted Arminianism.

The 1903 revision of the Westminster Confession eventually led a large number of congregations from the Arminian–leaning Cumberland Presbyterian Church to reunite with the PCUSA in 1906. While overwhelmingly approved, the reunion caused controversy within the PCUSA due to concerns over doctrinal compatibility and racial segregation in the Cumberland Presbyterian Church. Warfield was a strong critic of the merger on doctrinal grounds. Northern Presbyterians, such as Francis James Grimké and Herrick Johnson, objected to the creation of racially segregated presbyteries in the South, a concession demanded by the Cumberland Presbyterians as the price for reunion. Despite these objections, the merger was overwhelmingly approved.

==== Social gospel and evangelization ====
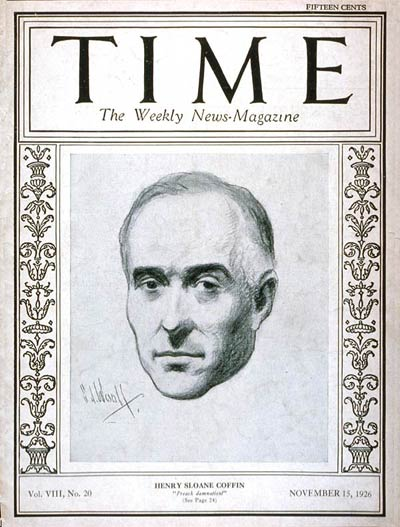
Henry Sloane Coffin on the cover of Time magazine November 15, 1926

By the early 20th century, the Social Gospel movement, which stressed social as well as individual salvation, had found support within the Presbyterian Church. Important figures such as Henry Sloane Coffin, president of New York's Union Seminary and a leading liberal, backed the movement. The most important promoter of the Social Gospel among Presbyterians was Charles Stelzle, the first head of the Workingmen's Department of the PCUSA. The department, created in 1903 to minister to working class immigrants, was the first official denominational agency to pursue a Social Gospel agenda. According to church historian Bradley Longfield, Stelzle "advocated for child-labor laws, workers' compensation, adequate housing, and more effective ways to address vice and crime in order to advance the kingdom of God." After a reorganization in 1908, the work of the department was split between the newly created Department of Church and Labor and the Department of Immigration.

While the Social Gospel was making inroads within the denomination, the ministry of baseball player turned evangelist Billy Sunday demonstrated that evangelicalism and the revivalist tradition was still a force within the denomination. Sunday became the most prominent evangelist of the early 20th century, preaching to over 100 million people and leading an estimated million to conversion throughout his career. Whereas Stelzle emphasized the social aspects of Christianity, Sunday's focus was primarily on the conversion and moral responsibility of the individual.

==== Fundamentalist–Modernist Controversy ====
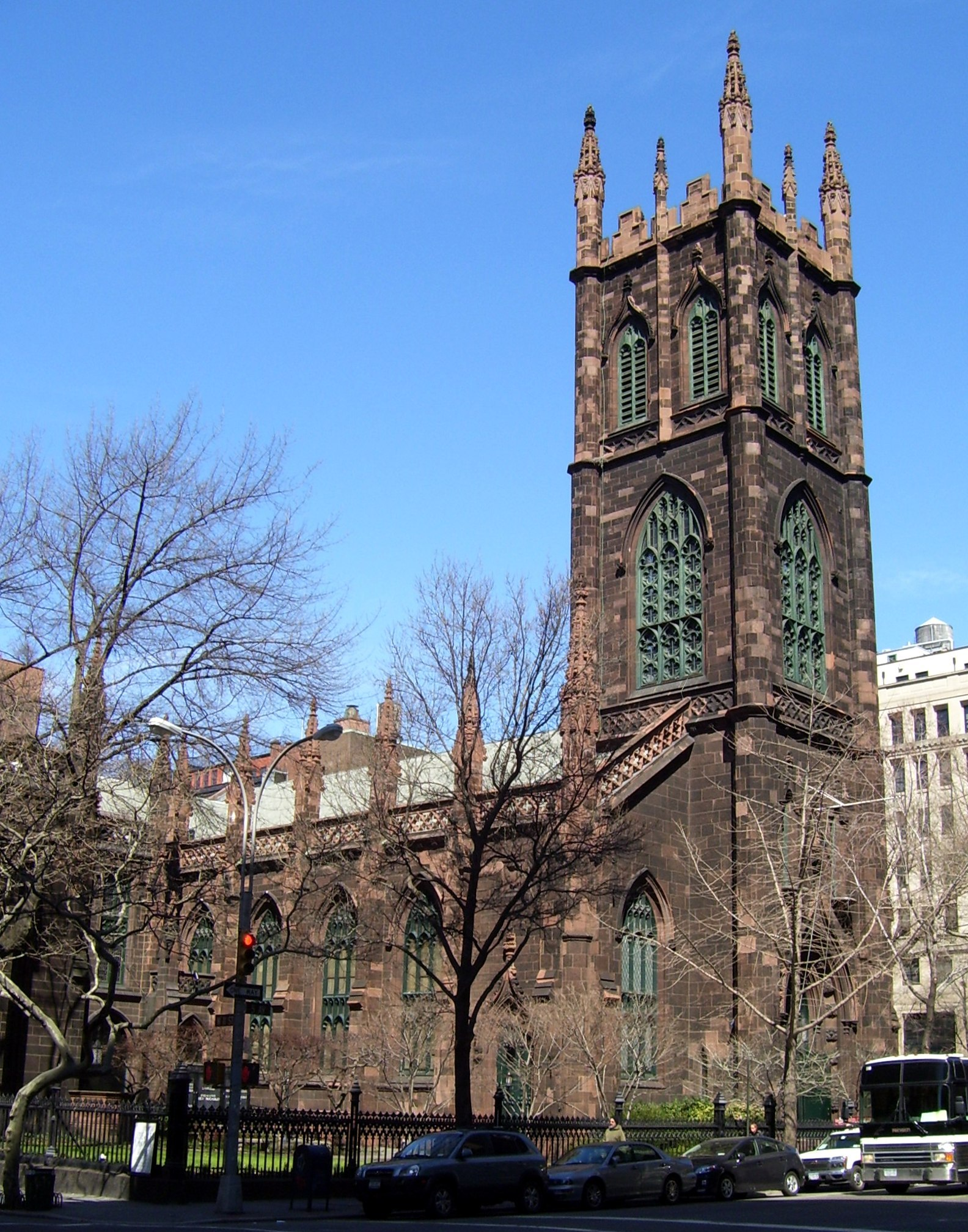
First Presbyterian Church in Manhattan, where Harry Emerson Fosdick preached "Shall the Fundamentalists Win?"

Between 1922 and 1936, the PCUSA became embroiled in the so-called Fundamentalist–Modernist Controversy. Tensions had been building in the years following the Old School-New School reunion of 1869 and the Briggs heresy trial of 1893. In 1909, the conflict was further exacerbated when the Presbytery of New York granted licenses to preach to a group of men who could not affirm the virgin birth of Jesus. The presbytery's action was appealed to the 1910 General Assembly, which then required all ministry candidates to affirm five essential or fundamental tenets of the Christian faith: biblical inerrancy, the virgin birth, substitutionary atonement, the bodily resurrection, and the miracles of Christ.

These themes were later expounded upon in The Fundamentals, a series of essays financed by wealthy Presbyterians Milton and Lyman Stewart. While the authors were drawn from the wider evangelical community, a large proportion were Presbyterian, including B. B. Warfield, William Erdman, Charles Erdman, and Robert Elliott Speer.

In 1922, prominent New York minister Harry Emerson Fosdick (who was Baptist but serving as pastor of New York's First Presbyterian Church by special arrangement) preached a sermon entitled "Shall the Fundamentalists Win?", challenging what he perceived to be a rising tide of intolerance against modernist or liberal theology within the denomination. In response, conservative Presbyterian minister Clarence E. Macartney preached a sermon called "Shall Unbelief Win?", in which he warned that liberalism would lead to "a Christianity without worship, without God, and without Jesus Christ". J. Gresham Machen of Princeton Theological Seminary also responded to Fosdick with his 1923 book Christianity and Liberalism, arguing that liberalism and Christianity were two different religions.

The 1923 General Assembly reaffirmed the five fundamentals and ordered the Presbytery of New York to ensure that First Presbyterian Church conformed to the Westminster Confession. A month later, the presbytery licensed two ministers who could not affirm the virgin birth, and in February 1924, it acquitted Fosdick who subsequently left his post in the Presbyterian Church.

That same year, a group of liberal ministers composed a statement defending their theological views known as the Auburn Affirmation due to the fact that it was based on the work of Robert Hastings Nichols of Auburn Seminary. Citing the Adopting Act of 1729, the Affirmation claimed for the PCUSA a heritage of doctrinal liberty. It also argued that church doctrine could only be established by action of the General Assembly and a majority of presbyteries; therefore, according to the Affirmation, the General Assembly acted unconstitutionally when it required adherence to the five fundamentals.

The 1925 General Assembly faced the threat of schism over the actions of the Presbytery of New York. Attempting to deescalate the situation, General Assembly moderator Charles Erdman proposed the creation of a special commission to study the church's problems and find solutions. The commission's report, released in 1926, sought to find a moderate approach to solving the church's theological conflict. In agreement with the Auburn Affirmation, the commission concluded that doctrinal pronouncements issued by the General Assembly were not binding without the approval of a majority of the presbyteries. In a defeat for conservatives, the report was adopted by the General Assembly. Conservatives were further disenchanted in 1929 when the General Assembly approved the ordination of women as lay elders.

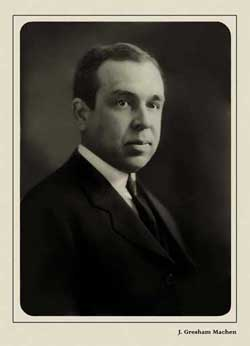
John Gresham Machen, organizer of the Orthodox Presbyterian Church

In 1929, Princeton Theological Seminary was reorganized to make the school's leadership and faculty more representative of the wider church rather than just Old School Presbyterianism. Two of the seminary's new board members were signatories to the Auburn Affirmation. In order to preserve Princeton's Old School legacy, Machen and several of his colleagues founded Westminster Theological Seminary.

Further controversy would erupt over the state of the church's missionary efforts. Sensing a loss of interest and support for foreign missions, the nondenominational Laymen's Foreign Mission Inquiry published Re-Thinking Missions: A Laymen's Inquiry after One Hundred Years in 1932, which promoted universalism and rejected the uniqueness of Christianity. Because the Inquiry had been initially supported by the PCUSA, many conservatives were concerned that Re-Thinking Missions represented the views of PCUSA's Board of Foreign Missions. Even after board members affirmed their belief in "Jesus Christ as the only Lord and Saviour", some conservatives remained skeptical, and such fears were reinforced by modernist missionaries, including celebrated author Pearl S. Buck. While initially evangelical, Buck's religious views developed over time to deny the divinity of Christ.

In 1933, Machen and other conservatives founded the Independent Board for Presbyterian Foreign Missions. A year later, the General Assembly declared the Independent Board unconstitutional and demanded that all church members cut ties with it. Machen refused to obey, and his ordination was suspended in 1936. Afterwards, Machen led an exodus of conservatives to form what would be later known as the Orthodox Presbyterian Church.

==== Later history ====
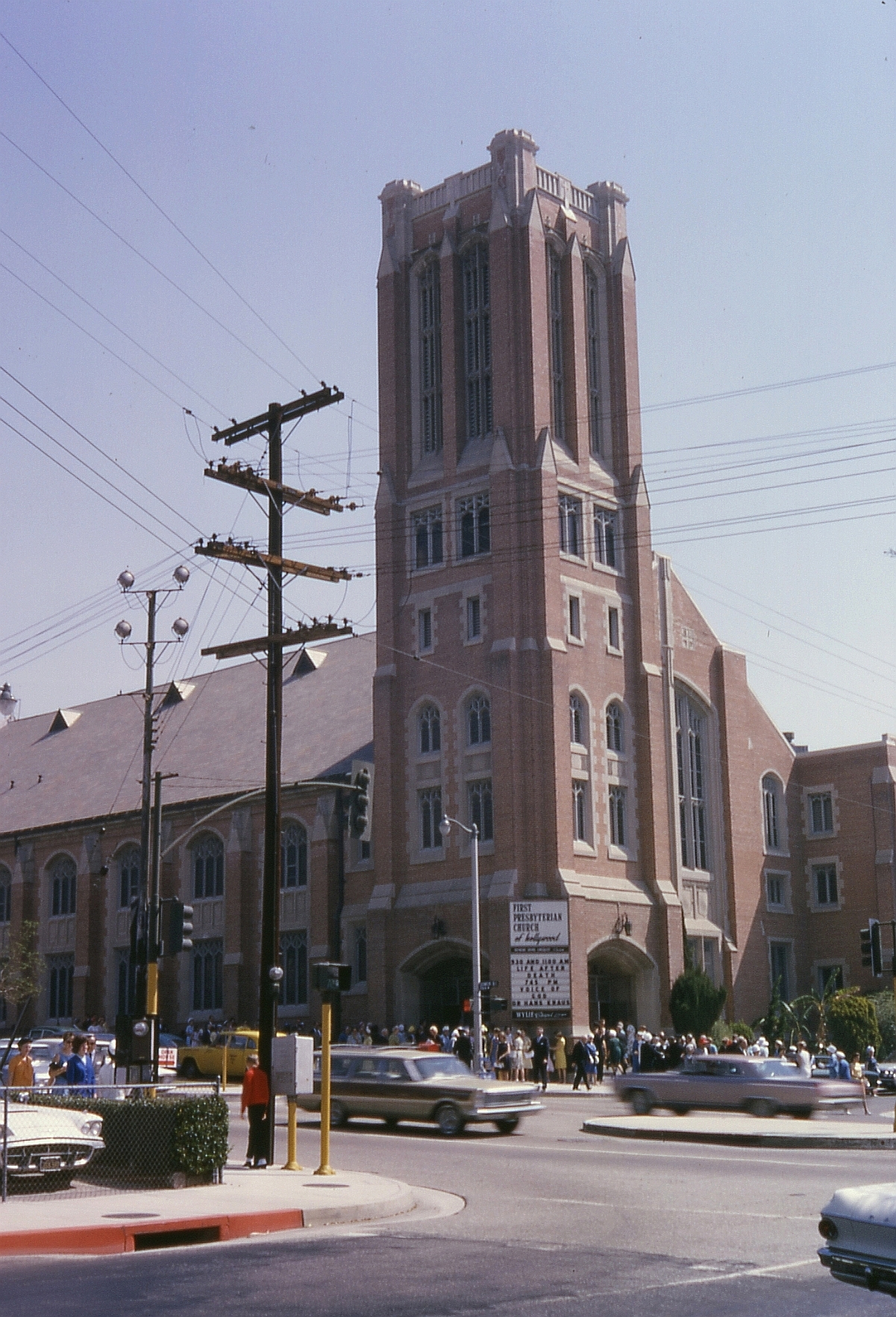
First Presbyterian Church of Hollywood. In the 1950s, the evangelical church boasted the largest PCUSA congregation.

With the onset of the Great Depression in the 1930s, the optimism of liberal theology was discredited. Many liberal theologians turned to neo-orthodoxy in an attempt to correct what were seen as the failings of liberalism, namely an overemphasis on divine immanence and the goodness of humanity along with the subordination of American Protestantism to secularism, science, and American culture. Neo-orthodox theologians instead emphasized divine transcendence and the sinfulness of humanity. From the 1940s into the 1950s, neo-orthodoxy set the tone at Presbyterian seminaries. Prominent Presbyterian theologians of this era include Elmer George Homrighausen and Joseph Haroutunian.

At the same time, evangelicalism was continuing to influence the Presbyterian Church. In the late 1940s, the efforts of Christian educator Henrietta Mears at First Presbyterian Church in Hollywood, California, would make it the largest church within the denomination. First Presbyterian's emphasis on evangelism would have a profound influence on a number of prominent figures including Louis Evans Jr., founder of Bel Air Presbyterian Church; Richard C. Halverson, Chaplain of the United States Senate; and Bill Bright, founder of Campus Crusade for Christ. According to historian George Marsden, Mears "may have had more to do with shaping west coast Presbyterianism than any other person."

In 1958, the PCUSA merged with the century-old United Presbyterian Church of North America (UPCNA). This denomination was formed by the 1858 union of Covenanter and Seceder Presbyterians. Between 1937 and 1955, the PCUSA had been discussing merger negotiations with the UPCNA, the Presbyterian Church in the United States and even the Episcopal Church before settling on the UPCNA merger.

Within the UPCNA, there was decreasing support for the merger amidst conservative reservations over the PCUSA's decision to ordain women to the office of minister in 1956 (the PCUSA had been ordaining women to the office of deacon since 1922 and elder since 1930). Nevertheless, the merger of the two denominations was celebrated in Pittsburgh that summer. The new denomination was named the United Presbyterian Church in the United States of America (UPCUSA).

== Beliefs ==
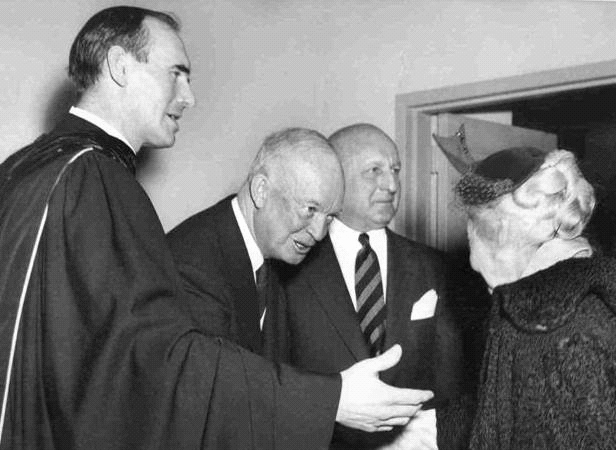
The Rev. Dr. George Docherty (left) and President Eisenhower (second from left) on the morning of February 7, 1954, at the New York Avenue Presbyterian Church

As a Calvinist church, the Presbyterian Church in the USA shared a common theological heritage with other Presbyterian and Reformed churches. The Bible was considered the only infallible source of doctrine and practice. The Presbyterian Church also acknowledged several subordinate standards, the most important being the Westminster Confession of Faith. As part of their ordination vows, ministers and other church officers were required to "sincerely receive and adopt the Confession of Faith of this Church, as containing the system of doctrine taught in the Holy Scriptures". In addition to the Confession of Faith, the Westminster Shorter Catechism and Larger Catechism were also used.

Throughout the denomination's existence, a "relatively uniform" view of biblical authority and interpretation based on Reformed scholasticism dominated Presbyterian thought until the 1930s. In reaction to the Scientific Revolution, the doctrine of biblical infallibility as found in the Confession of Faith was transformed into biblical inerrancy, the idea that the Bible is without error in matters of science and history. This approach to biblical interpretation was accompanied by Scottish common sense realism, which dominated Princeton, Harvard, and other American colleges in the 18th and 19th centuries. When applied to biblical interpretation, Common Sense philosophy encouraged theologians to assume that people in all times and cultures thought in similar ways. Therefore, it was believed that a modern interpreter could know the mind of biblical writers regardless of differences in culture and context. This form of biblical literalism was standard teaching in Presbyterian colleges and seminaries.

The rise of higher criticism in the late 1800s posed a challenge to this dominant view by arguing that "the Bible was composed of strands of material written by ancient, Near-Eastern people whose world view and manner of thought was formulated in language structures and cultural contexts very different from those of nineteenth century Americans." A division emerged between a majority who held that inerrancy was an essential doctrine and a growing minority that believed it actually undermined scriptural authority for "faith and life". Beginning in 1892, the General Assembly sought to combat liberal theology by specifying beliefs that every minister should affirm. From 1910 to 1927, the Confession of Faith was officially interpreted with reference to five fundamental beliefs: biblical inerrancy, the virgin birth, substitutionary atonement, the bodily resurrection, and the miracles of Christ.

Faced with possible schism, the General Assembly opted for "theological decentralization" after 1927. It was determined that the General Assembly could not define essential beliefs without first amending the church's constitution, which allowed a greater degree of toleration for alternative interpretations of the Confession. The outcome of the Fundamentalist–Modernist Controversy was that the church ultimately accepted "moderate liberalism" in order to maintain peace.

Just as liberal theology was gaining acceptance in the 1930s, however, a new theological movement emerged as some liberals became disenchanted with the optimism of their tradition in the face of World War I, the Great Depression and the rise of European fascism. The neo-orthodox looked back to the Bible and the Protestant Reformers of the 16th century in order to construct a "more sturdy theology" able to address the crisis of Western culture. Unlike the liberals who tended to view the Bible "as a record of humanity's evolving religious consciousness", the neo-orthodox understood the Bible to be the instrument through which God spoke and revealed himself—in the person of Jesus Christ—to humanity. At the same time, neo-orthodoxy was distinguished from fundamentalism in its acceptance of biblical criticism and rejection of biblical inerrancy. While the Bible was an "adequate witness to the one revelation of God, Jesus Christ", it was a fallible document written by fallible men. Neo-orthodoxy was also characterized by an emphasis on divine transcendence rather than divine immanence, renewed affirmation of total depravity, and resistance to secularism and cultural accommodation within the church. By the 1940s, neo-orthodoxy and the closely related biblical theology movement had become the unifying doctrinal consensus within the PCUSA.

== Organization ==
Year	Membership
1789	18,000 (estimation)
1800	20,000 (estimation)
1810	28,901
1820	72,096
1830	173,327
1837	220,557
1839	126,583 Old School; 106,000 New School
1849	200,830 OS; 139,047 NS
1859	279,630 OS; 137,990 NS
1869	258,963 OS; 172,560 NS
1870	446,560
1880	578,671
1887	697,835
1925	1,828,916
1929	1,959,006
1931	1,859,495
1933	1,914,886
1935	1,909,487
1937	1,906,100
1940	1,971,364
1942	1,986,257
1944	2,040,399
1946	2,174,530
1947	2,234,798
1950	2,364,112
1952	2,441,933
1953	2,492,504
1954	2,526,129
1955	2,645,745
1956	2,717,320
1957	2,775,464

=== Governing bodies ===
The Presbyterian Church in the USA was organized according to presbyterian polity. The church's constitution consisted of the Westminster Confession of Faith and Catechisms, the Form of Government (adapted from the 1645 Form of Presbyterial Church Government), the Book of Discipline (adapted from the Scottish Book of Discipline), and the Directory for the Worship of God (adapted from the 1645 Westminster Directory). Consistent with presbyterian polity, the governance of the PCUSA was vested in a series of judicatories.

A local church was governed by the session, a body of ruling elders elected by the congregation and moderated by the pastor. The session was charged with overseeing the church's spiritual affairs and providing for public worship according to the Directory. The session was also responsible for dispensing church discipline to church members.

Local churches were further organized into geographically defined presbyteries. A presbytery was a convention of all ministers within its jurisdiction and one ruling elder chosen by each session. Collegiate churches were entitled to be represented by two or more ruling elders in proportion to the number of its pastors. Presbyteries were responsible for examining, licensing and ordaining candidates to the ministry, as well as judging and removing ministers. They were also responsible for resolving doctrinal or disciplinary questions and also functioned as courts of appeal from sessions. An executive commission was appointed to more efficiently manage the presbytery's work, and judicial cases were referred to a judicial commission.

Three or more presbyteries formed a synod, which met annually and whose members consisted of ministers and ruling elders representing the presbyteries. Synods functioned as courts of appeal from the presbyteries. They also had the responsibility to ensure the presbyteries and sessions below them adhered to the church's constitution.

The highest judicatory and court of appeal in the church was the General Assembly. Members of the General Assembly included equal numbers of ministers and ruling elders chosen by the presbyteries. Members of the General Assembly were called "Commissioners to the General Assembly". The General Assembly met annually and was presided over by a moderator. It also appointed an executive commission and a judicial commission. The General Assembly could propose constitutional amendments, but these had to be approved by a majority of all presbyteries before taking effect.

=== Boards ===
The work of the denomination was carried out through various church boards. As of 1922, these boards included the following:

- Board of Home Missions
- Board of Foreign Missions
- Board of Education granted scholarships to those seeking seminary education.
- Board of Publication oversaw the publication of religious literature as well as the denomination's Sabbath schools.
- Board of the Church Erection Fund provided financial aid to congregations unable to construct their own church buildings. It also provided interest-free loans to help build manses.
- Board of Relief provided financial aid to retired and disabled ministers and missionaries. It also provided aid to the families of deceased ministers. It also operated homes for disabled ministers and the widow and orphans of deceased ministers.
- Board of Missions for Freedmen was established at the end of the Civil War to establish churches and schools for freedmen. It continued to operate in the southern United States until 1923. Its responsibilities included helping to educate and supply African American preachers and teachers. It also built and supported black schools, churches, colleges and seminaries.
- Board of Aid for Colleges and Academies oversaw fundraising for affiliated institutions of higher education.

In 1923, there was a general reorganization of the PCUSA's boards. Seven boards, including Home Missions and Missions for Freedmen, were eliminated and their work consolidated under the newly created Board of National Missions.

== Missions ==
After the Old School–New School split, the Old School General Assembly created the Board of Foreign Missions. Missions were started in Africa, Brazil, China, Colombia, India, Japan, and Thailand. When the New School (which had been partnering with the Congregationalist ABCFM) reunited with the Old School in 1870, the Board of Foreign Missions took over the ABCFM's operations in Iran, Iraq, and Syria. The reunited denomination also expanded missions into Korea, Central America, South America, and the Philippines.

The Board of Home Missions carried on work among Native Americans, Jews, and Asian immigrants. In the words of Frederick J. Heuser, Jr. of the Presbyterian Historical Society, the PCUSA's missionary work established "indigenous churches, a variety of educational facilities, hospitals, orphanages, seminaries, and other institutions that reflected the church's educational, medical and evangelical ministry."

== Ecumenical relations ==
Along with other mainline Protestant churches, the Presbyterian Church in the USA was a founding member of the Federal Council of Churches (a predecessor to the National Council of Churches) in 1908. During World War I, the PCUSA was a leading contributor to the work of the Federal Council's General War–Time Commission, which coordinated chaplaincy and supported the war effort. From 1918 to 1920, the church participated in a short-lived international ecumenical organization called the Interchurch World Movement.

== See also ==
- List of moderators of the General Assembly of the Presbyterian Church in the United States of America
