= Old School–New School controversy =

Schism of the Presbyterian Church in the United States of America

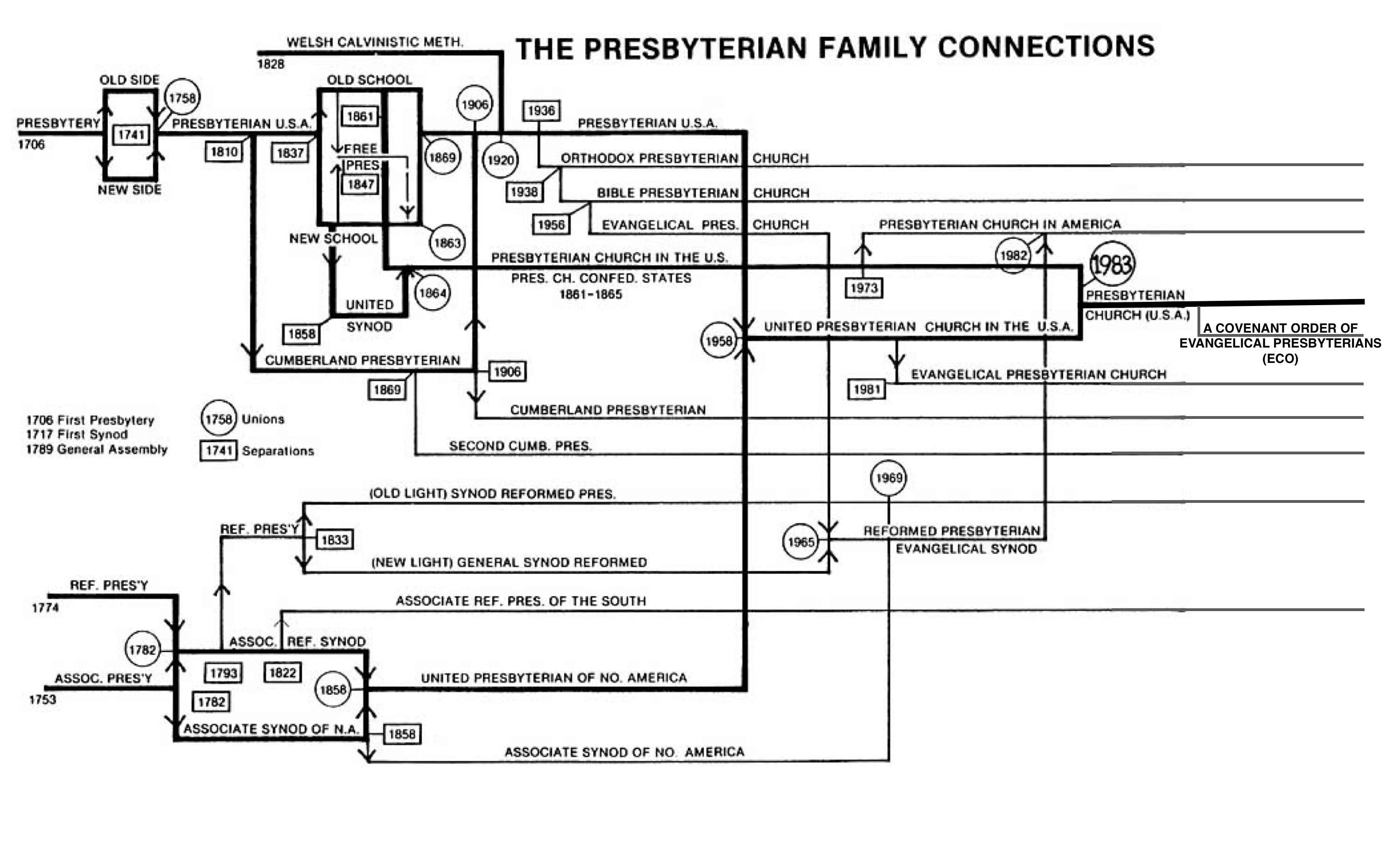
The P.C.U.S.A. split in 1837 to become New School Presbyterians and Old School Presbyterians.

The Old School–New School controversy was a schism of the Presbyterian Church in the United States of America that took place in 1837 and lasted for over 20 years. The Old School, led by Charles Hodge of Princeton Theological Seminary, was more conservative theologically and did not support the revival movement. It called for traditional Calvinist orthodoxy as outlined in the Westminster standards.

The New School derived from the reinterpretation of Calvinism by New England Congregationalist theologians Jonathan Edwards, Samuel Hopkins and Joseph Bellamy, and wholly embraced revivalism. Though there was much diversity among them, the Edwardsian Calvinists commonly rejected what they called "Old Calvinism" in light of their understandings of God, the human person, and the Bible.

Later, both the Old School and New School branches split further over the issue of slavery, into Southern and Northern churches. The latter supported the abolition of slavery. After three decades of separate operation, the two sides of the controversy merged, in 1865 in the South and in 1870 in the North. Two Presbyterian denominations were formed (PCUS and PC-USA, in the South and North, respectively).

== Origins of the controversy (1789–1837) ==
=== Origins of American Presbyterianism ===
During the 18th century, New England and Mid-Atlantic churchmen formed the first presbyteries in American colonies that would later become the United States. Many Presbyterians were ethnic Scots or Scots-Irish.

After resolving the Old Side–New Side controversy in 1758, many reformed presbyterians reconciled into the Synod of New York and Philadelphia. This reorganized after the American Revolution to become the Presbyterian Church in the United States of America (P.C.U.S.A.). The first General Assembly of the P.C.U.S.A. met in Philadelphia in 1789. The new church was organized into four synods: New York and New Jersey, Philadelphia, Virginia, and the Carolinas. These synods included 16 presbyteries and an estimated membership of 18,000, and used the Westminster Standards as the main doctrinal standards.

=== Evangelistic cooperation with Congregationalists ===
As a result of the Plan of Union of 1801 with the Congregationalist General Association of Connecticut, Presbyterian missionaries began to work with Congregationalist missionaries in western New York and the Northwest Territory to advance Christian evangelism. Many Presbyterians and Congregationalists took up the cause of foreign missions through the 1810 formation of the American Board of Commissioners for Foreign Missions (ABCFM).

Similarly, ecumenical "home missions" efforts became more formal under the auspices of the American Home Missionary Society, founded in 1826. This missions emphasis resulted in new churches being formed with either Congregational or Presbyterian forms of government, or a mixture of the two, supported by older established churches with a different form of government. Often clergy came into conflict with their own congregations over issues of ecclesiology and polity. It also resulted in a difference in doctrinal commitment and views among churches in close fellowship, leading to suspicion and controversy.

=== Controversies during the Second Great Awakening ===
Collectively, the growth of Unitarianism, the revival movement, and abolitionism introduced tensions among Presbyterian leaders. They questioned the continued intermingling with Congregationalist influence.

==== Unitarianism ====
Throughout the 18th century, Enlightenment ideas of the power of reason and free will became widespread among Congregationalist ministers. Those ministers and their congregations disagreed with more traditionalist, Calvinist parties.

When the Harvard Divinity School Hollis Professor of Divinity David Tappan died in 1803 and the president of Harvard Joseph Willard died a year later, in 1804, acting president Eliphalet Pearson and overseer of the college Jedidiah Morse demanded that orthodox men be elected. But, the Unitarian Henry Ware was elected in 1805. This marked the shift at Harvard from the dominance of traditional, Calvinist ideas to the dominance of liberal, Arminian ideas (defined by traditionalists as Unitarian ideas). After the appointment of Ware, and the election of the liberal Samuel Webber to the presidency of Harvard two years later, Eliphalet Pearson and other conservatives founded the Andover Theological Seminary as an orthodox, trinitarian alternative to the Harvard Divinity School.

==== Revivalism and New Haven theology ====
In the U.S. the Second Great Awakening (1800–1830s) was the second great religious revival in United States history and consisted of renewed personal salvation experienced in revival meetings. Presbyterian Rev. Charles Finney (1792–1875) was a key leader of the evangelical revival movement in America. From 1821 onwards he conducted revival meetings across many north-eastern states and won many converts. For him, a revival was not a miracle but a change of mindset that was ultimately a matter for the individual's free will. His revival meetings created anxiety in a penitent's mind that one could only save their soul by submission to the will of God, as illustrated by Finney's quotations from the Bible. In the West (now Upper South) especially—at Cane Ridge, Kentucky and in Tennessee—the revival strengthened the Methodists and Baptists. The Churches of Christ and Christian Church (Disciples of Christ) arose from the Stone-Campbell Restoration Movement. It also introduced into America a new form of religious expression—the Scottish camp meeting.

In the 1820s, Nathaniel William Taylor, (appointed Professor of Didactic Theology at Yale Divinity School in 1822), was the leading figure behind a smaller strand of Edwardsian Calvinism which came to be called "the New Haven theology". Taylor developed Edwardsian Calvinism further, interpreting regeneration in ways he thought consistent with Edwards and his New England followers and appropriate for the work of revivalism, and used his influence to publicly support the revivalist movement and defend its beliefs and practices against opponents. The Old School rejected this idea as heresy, suspicious as they were of all New School revivalism.

==== Abolition ====
In New England, the renewed interest in religion inspired a wave of social activism, including abolitionism. In 1834, students at Cincinnati's Lane Theological Seminary (a Presbyterian institution) famously debated "abolition versus colonialization" and voted overwhelmingly for immediate, rather than gradual, abolition. After being censored by the seminary's board and then its president Lyman Beecher, many theological students (known as the Lane Rebels) left Lane to join Oberlin College, a Congregationalist institution in northern Ohio founded in 1833, which accepted their abolitionist principles and became an Underground Railroad stop.

=== Break Point ===
The controversy reached a climax at a meeting of the general assembly in Philadelphia in 1836 when the Old School party found themselves in the majority and voted to annul the Plan of Union as unconstitutionally adopted. They then voted to expel the synods of Western Reserve (which included Oberlin as a part of Lorain County, Ohio), Utica, Geneva, and Genesee, because they were formed on the basis of the Plan of Union. At the General Assembly of 1837, these synods were refused recognition as lawfully part of the meeting. These and others who sympathized with them departed and formed their own general assembly meeting in another church building nearby, setting the stage for a court dispute about which of the two general assemblies constituted the true continuing Presbyterian church. The Supreme Court of Pennsylvania decided that the Old School Assembly was the true representative of the Presbyterian church and their decisions would govern. According to Nathan O. Hatch, "The most surprising thing about the 1837 schism of the Presbyterian church is that the church had held together so long."

== Schism into "Old School" and New School" Presbyterians (1837–1857) ==
This 1837 event left two separate organizations, the Old School Presbyterians, and the New School Presbyterians. Generally speaking, the Old School was attractive to the more recent Scotch Irish element, while the New School appealed to more established Yankees (who by agreement became Presbyterians instead of Congregationalists when they left New England).

=== Old School Presbyterians ===
Theologically, The Old School, led by Charles Hodge of Princeton Theological Seminary, was much more conservative and was not supportive of revivals. It called for traditional Calvinist orthodoxy as outlined in the Westminster standards.

Prominent members of the Old School included Ashbel Green, George Junkin, William Latta, Charles Hodge, William Buell Sprague, and Samuel Stanhope Smith.

Schools associated with the Old School included Princeton Theological Seminary and Andover Theological Seminary.

=== New School Presbyterians ===
Theologically, The New School derived from the reconstructions of Calvinism by New England Puritans Jonathan Edwards, Samuel Hopkins and Joseph Bellamy and wholly embraced revivalism. Though there was much diversity among them, the Edwardsian Calvinists commonly rejected what they called "Old Calvinism" in light of their understandings of God, the human person and the Bible.

The New School Presbyterians continued to participate in partnerships with the Congregationalists and their New Divinity "methods." They sat on boards such as the American Home Missions Society and the American Board of Commissioners for Foreign Missions.

Prominent members of the New School included Nathaniel William Taylor, Eleazar T. Fitch, Chauncey Goodrich, Albert Barnes, Lyman Beecher (the father of Harriet Beecher Stowe and Henry Ward Beecher), Henry Boynton Smith, Erskine Mason, George Duffield, Nathan Beman, Charles Finney, George Cheever, Samuel Fisher, and Thomas McAuley.

Schools associated with the New School included Lane Theological Seminary in Cincinnati and Yale Divinity School.

== Two become Four: Internal divisions over slavery (1857–1861) ==
As the debate over slavery and abolition ratcheted up in the 1840s and 1850s, both the New School and the Old School began to experience internal tensions, largely along North-South (abolitionism vs. pro-slavery) lines. As the ABCFM and AHMS refused to take positions on slavery, some Presbyterian churches joined the abolitionist American Missionary Association instead, and even became Congregationalists or Free Presbyterians. African-American Presbyterian pastor Theodore S. Wright helped to form anti-slavery societies, such as the American Anti-Slavery Society and the American and Foreign Anti-Slavery Society. New School Presbyterian Rev. Henry Ward Beecher advocated for rifles ("Beecher's Bibles") to be sent through the New England Emigrant Aid Company to address the pro-slavery violence in Kansas. While Harriet Beecher Stowe's Uncle Tom's Cabin made the case against slavery, her husband continued to teach at Andover Theological Seminary.

In 1857, the New School Presbyterians divided over slavery, with the Southern New School Presbyterians forming the United Synod of the Presbyterian Church.

Despite the tensions, the Old School Presbyterians managed to stay united for several more years. However, in the summer of 1861, the Old School General Assembly, in a vote of 156 to 66, passed the Gardiner Spring Resolutions which called for the Old School Presbyterians to support the Federal Government. In order to attempt to alleviate the situation, the Assembly added language which clarified that the term "Federal Government" referred to "not any particular administration, or the peculiar opinions of any particular party," but to "the central administration....appointed and inaugurated according to the forms prescribed in the Constitution of the United States..." Inevitably, though, the Southern Old School Presbyterians still departed, and on December 4, 1861, the first General Assembly of the new Presbyterian Church in the Confederate States of America was held in Augusta, Georgia. Thus at the beginning of the Civil War there were four related branches of American Presbyterians: The Northern New School, the Northern Old School, the Southern New School, and the Southern Old School.

== Four Become Two: Northern Presbyterians and Southern Presbyterians (1860s) ==
During the 1860s, the Old School and New School factions reunited to become Northern Presbyterians (PC-USA) and Southern Presbyterians (PCUS).

In the South, the issue of the merger of Old School and New School Presbyterians had come up as early as 1861. Some old schoolers such as James Henley Thornwell opposed the merger, but Thornwell's death in 1862 removed a significant amount of opposition to merger, and at the 1863 General Assembly of the PCCS, a committee, headed by Robert Lewis Dabney, was formed to confer with a committee formed by the United Synod. While some conservatives felt that union with United Synod would be a repudiation of Old School convictions, others, such as Dabney feared that should the union fail, the United Synod would most likely establish its own seminary, propagating New School Presbyterian theology. Ultimately, in 1864, the United Synod of the South merged with the PCCS, which would be renamed the Presbyterian Church in the United States following the end of the Civil War in 1865.

In the North, Presbyterians wound up following a similar path to reunion. Both Old School and New School Presbyterians in the North had shared similar convictions regarding support of the Federal Government, although support of the Federal Government was not as unanimous amongst Northern Old School Presbyterians. The major issue was slavery, and while the Old School Presbyterians had been reluctant to debate the issue (which had preserved the unity of Old School Presbyterians until 1861) by 1864, the Old School had adopted a more mainstream position, and both shifts wound up moving the Old School and New Schoolers closer to union.

Eventually, in 1867, the Plan of Union was presented to the General Synods of both the Old School and New School Presbyterians in the North. With some Presbyterians on the border states having left the PC-USA in favor of the PCUS, opposition was reduced to a small faction of Old School holdovers such as Charles Hodge (raising concerns over the New School's fairly loose stance regarding confessional subscription), who, while preventing as much of a decisive victory in favor of reunion at the 1868 General Assembly, nevertheless failed to prevent the Old School General Assembly from approving the motion that the Plan of Union be sent to the presbyteries for their approval. The Plan of Union was eventually approved, and in 1869, the Old and New Schools reunited.

== Aftermath of reunion ==
=== PCUS in the South ===
Amongst the Southern Presbyterians, the reunion of the Old School and New School factions failed to create a major effect. The New School Presbyterians of the South simply wound up being absorbed into the larger Old School Presbyterian faction. Shifts in theological attitudes in the PCUS would not begin until the 1920s and 1930s.

=== PC-USA in the North ===
Amongst Northern Presbyterians, the effect of the reunion was felt soon after. The PC-USA eventually found itself becoming increasingly ecumenical and supporting various social causes. At the same time, the PC-USA also became increasingly lax in doctrinal subscription, and New School attempts to modify Calvinism would become embodied in the 1903 revision of the Westminster Standards. In time, the PC-USA would eventually welcome most of the Arminian Cumberland Presbyterians into their fold (1906), and incidents such as the Charles A. Briggs trial of 1893 would become simply a precursor of the fundamentalist–modernist controversy of the 1920s.

== See also ==
- American Presbyterianism

== Bibliography ==
- Gutjahr Paul C. Charles Hodge: Guardian of American Orthodoxy (Oxford University Press; 2011) 477 pages; a standard scholarly biography
- Marsden, George M. The Evangelical Mind and the New School Presbyterian Experience: A Case Study of Thought and Theology in Nineteenth Century America (Yale University Press, 1970)
- Parker, Harold M., Jr. The United Synod of the South: The Southern New School Presbyterian Church (1988)
- Longfield, Bradley J. (2013), Presbyterians and American Culture: A History, Louisville, Kentucky: Westminster Johh Knox Press, ISBN 9780664231569.
- Nevin, Alfred (1888), History of the Presbytery of Philadelphia, and of the Philadelphia Central, Philadelphia: W. S. Fortescue & Co.
- Thompson, Robert Ellis (1895), A History of the Presbyterian Churches in the United States, The Christian Literature Company.
