= Plan of Union of 1801 =

1801 agreement between two American churches

The Plan of Union of 1801 was an agreement between the Congregational churches of New England and the Presbyterian Church in the United States of America for mutual support and joint effort in evangelizing the American frontier. It lasted until 1852.

== Background ==
Prior to 1801, Congregationalists and Presbyterians had enjoyed friendly relationships. Both denominations shared a common Calvinistic theology, while differing in church polity (with Congregationalists and Presbyterians having adopted the Savoy Declaration and Westminster Standards respectively). There were also many instances stretching back to colonial times where Puritan congregations embraced presbyterian polity.

== Provisions ==
The Plan of Union was initially agreed upon between the General Assembly of the Presbyterian Church and the Connecticut General Association of Congregational Churches. The Plan was later approved by the Congregational associations in Vermont, New Hampshire, and Massachusetts.

It enabled churches of either denomination to hire ministers from the other. Congregations were given the choice whether to be governed by congregational polity or by the Presbyterian model of a session of ruling elders. The Plan also made it possible for the Middle Association of Congregationalists in New York to become a subordinate jurisdiction of the Presbyterian Synod of Albany.

As part of the Plan, the General Assembly of the Presbyterian Church designated the Congregationalist American Board of Commissioners for Foreign Missions (ABCFM) as its recognized missions agency in 1826. By 1831, the majority of board members and missionaries of the ABCFM were Presbyterians. As a result, most of the local churches established by the organization during this period were Presbyterian. Congregationalists essentially "turned over domestic evangelistic efforts to Presbyterians".

== Termination ==
A consequence of this arrangement was that the Presbyterian Church received an influx of pastors and congregations sympathetic to the New England theology that prevailed within the Congregational churches. This ultimately led to the Old School-New School Controversy that divided the Presbyterian Church in 1837.

The Old School Presbyterian Church ended cooperation with the Congregationalists in 1837, but the New School Presbyterian Church would remain in union with the Congregational churches until 1852. That year the Congregationalists ended their participation in the Plan of Union. By this time, Congregationalists had developed a greater denominational consciousness, which ultimately led to the creation of the National Council of the Congregational Churches in 1865.

== See also ==
- American Home Missionary Society

== Bibliography ==
- Englund-Krieger, Mark J. (2015). The Presbyterian Mission Enterprise: From Heathen to Partner. Wipf and Stock Publishers. ISBN 978-1-63087-878-8.
- Hall, Russell E. (Summer 1982). "American Presbyterian Churches—A Genealogy, 1706–1982". Journal of Presbyterian History. 60 (2): 95–128. JSTOR 23328527.
- Heuser, Frederick J. Jr. (1988). "Presbyterians in Mission: An Historic Overview" (PDF). Gale. Archived from the original (PDF) on January 20, 2015.
- Hood, E. Lyman (1901). The National Council of Congregational Churches in the United States. Boston, Massachusetts: Pilgrim Press.
- Longfield, Bradley J. (2013). Presbyterians and American Culture: A History. Louisville, Kentucky: Westminster Johh Knox Press. ISBN 978-0-664-23156-9.
- Thompson, Robert Ellis (1895). A History of the Presbyterian Churches in the United States. The Christian Literature Company.
