= Interchurch World Movement =

The Interchurch World Movement was an attempt to unite some of the main enterprises of the Protestant churches, so as to avoid duplication of effort and waste of funds.

The movement was started by the Board of Foreign Missions of the Presbyterian Church in December 1918 (107 years ago), when it invited the various Protestant denominations to send representatives to a meeting in New York to confer upon the need for co-operation among the churches. The result of the conference was the launching of the Interchurch World Movement with the object not of any organic union of the denominations but the attempt to see how much could be done effectively in common.

A general committee from all the churches was selected of which S. Earl Taylor became the general secretary. As head of the Methodist Centenary Fund, he had shown great executive capacity and organizing ability. The committee set itself to work to first make a survey of world conditions and it has not completed this phase of the work.

Friction appeared among the various denominations which resulted in a practical abandonment of the work in 1920 (106 years ago).
