= New Castle Presbytery =

Parent organization of the Presbyterian Church (USA), Synod of Mid-Atlantic

- Predecessor: Presbytery of Philadelphia
- Formation: 1717
- Type: Presbytery
- Headquarters: Newark, DE
- Region served: Delaware and the Maryland Eastern Shore
- Parent organization: Presbyterian Church (USA)
- Website: www.ncpresbytery.org

The New Castle Presbytery is a presbytery of the Presbyterian Church (USA). Its geographic area is the entire state of Delaware and the Maryland Eastern Shore. In 2022, it reported 49 congregations, 108 ministers, and 5,736 members.

The Presbytery was formed in 1717 after the division of the Presbytery of Philadelphia into three presbyteries, which were subordinate to the newly formed Synod of Philadelphia.
