= Synod of New York =

- Predecessor: Presbytery of New Brunswick and New York
- Successor: Synod of New York and Philadelphia
- Formation: 1745
- Dissolved: 1758
- Type: Synod
- Headquarters: Elizabethtown, N.J.

The Synod of New York was a Presbyterian synod formed in 1745 during the Old Side–New Side Controversy by the Presbytery of New Brunswick and the Presbytery of New York. The synod was made up of adherents to the "New Side" in opposition to the "Old Side" who formed the Synod of Philadelphia. The two synods united in 1758 to form the Synod of New York and Philadelphia. At the time of reunion, New Side ministers outnumbered the Old Side by more than three to one.
