= Gilbert Tennent =

American minister (1703–1764)

The Reverend Gilbert Tennent
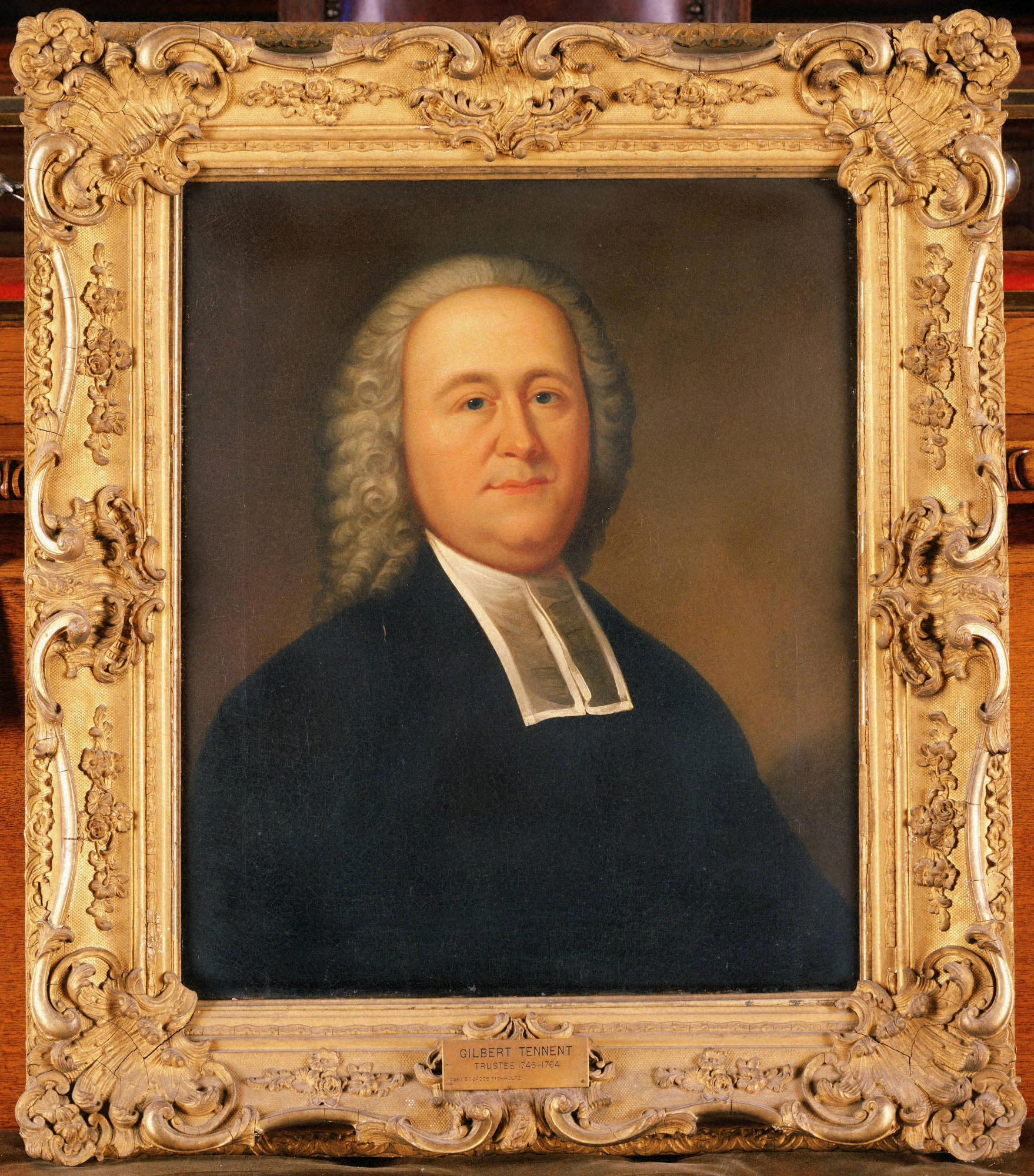
- Portrait by Jacob Eichholtz
- Born: 5 February 1703; Vinecash, County Armagh, Ireland
- Died: 23 July 1764 (aged 61); Philadelphia, Province of Pennsylvania, British America
- Resting place: Abington Presbyterian Church Cemetery, Abington Township, Montgomery County, Pennsylvania
- Education: Honorary Master of Arts
- Alma mater: Yale College (1725)
- Occupation: Presbyterian minister
- Years active: 1726–1764
- Known for: The First Great Awakening in the Middle Colonies
- Board member of: Original trustee of the College of New Jersey
- Spouse(s): Cornelia de Peyster (2nd wife); Sarah Spofford (3rd wife)
- Children: Cornelia Tennent
- Parent(s): William Tennent, Catherine Kennedy
- Relatives: William Tennent (brother); John Tennent (brother); Charles Tennent (brother)

Gilbert Tennent (5 February 1703 – 23 July 1764) was a Presbyterian revivalist minister in Colonial America. Born into a Scotch-Irish family in County Armagh, Ireland, he migrated to America with his parents, studied theology, and along with Jonathan Edwards and George Whitefield, became one of the leaders of the evangelical revival known as the First Great Awakening. His most famous sermon, On the Danger of an Unconverted Ministry, also known as the "Nottingham Sermon," compared "Old Side" ministers to the biblical Pharisees of the Gospels, triggering a schism in the Presbyterian Church which lasted for 17 years. A prolific writer, Tennent would later work towards reunification of the two synods involved.

== Early life ==
Gilbert Tennent, the eldest son of William Tennent and Catherine Kennedy, was born at Vinecash, County Armagh, Ireland. Gilbert's father was a Church of Ireland minister who emigrated to the American colonies before 1718, when he successfully applied to the Synod of Philadelphia to be accepted as a Presbyterian minister. In 1721, the family moved from Westchester, New York to Pennsylvania where William served as pastor at Bensalem in Bucks County. Five years later he accepted a call to Neshaminy in what is now Warminster where he remained until his death in 1764.

Gilbert and his three younger brothers received a classical education from their father in Ireland and America. Gilbert briefly studied medicine but in 1723 switched his focus to theology. In May 1725, he was licensed to preach by the Presbytery of Philadelphia. The same year he received an honorary Master of Arts degree from Yale College in recognition of his educational achievements despite not having attended lectures.

== Ministry ==
In December 1725, Tennent accepted a call to ministry in Newcastle, Delaware but left abruptly after a few weeks. He was consequently reprimanded by the Synod. He assisted his father in the founding of Log College at Neshaminy, but soon accepted a call to establish a church in New Brunswick, New Jersey.

While at New Brunswick, Tennent became friends with Theodorus Frelinghuysen, a Dutch Reformed minister who greatly influenced Tennent and helped him develop his ministerial and preaching skills.

Tennent became an enthusiastic orator known for "preaching the terrors" and for his fiery exhortations to repent. Tennent met George Whitefield, an itinerant evangelist minister from England, in April 1740. He accompanied Whitefield on a preaching tour of New Jersey and Staten Island, and in the winter of 1741 embarked on his own tour of New England. George Whitefield was impressed with Tennent's preaching and referred to him as "a son of thunder" in his journal.

Tennent's views increasing brought into him into conflict with the Synod. He supported "enthusiastic itinerancy," opposed changes to the Synod's educational requirements for ordination, and insisted that only those who experienced "genuine conversion" should be ministers.

He was scornful of his critics among conservative or "Old Side" Presbyterians and in his 1740 sermon The Danger of an Unconverted Ministry, also known as the Nottingham Sermon, denounced his opponents, calling them Pharisees who had, "no experience of a special work of the Holy Ghost upon their own souls."

In 1738, several "New Side" ministers led by Tennent had split from the Presbytery of Philadelphia and formed the Presbytery of New Brunswick. In 1741, the Synod of Philadelphia voted to exclude the New Brunswick Presbytery, effectively expelling Tennent and other revivalist ministers. In 1745, the Presbytery of New Brunswick joined with the Presbytery of New York to form the Synod of New York.

Tennent expressed regret for his role in fomenting the dissension that resulted in the scism. His sermons became less passionate and he worked towards reconciliation with the Old Side faction. In 1743, he left New Brunswick to become the founding pastor of Philadelphia's Second Presbyterian Church.

In 1746, Tennent was elected a trustee of the recently chartered College of New Jersey (now Princeton University). In 1753, he travelled to England to raise the funds to build what would become Nassau Hall.

The Old Side and New Side factions reunited in 1758. The Synod of Philadelphia and Synod of New York merged and Tennent was elected as the new moderator.

== Emissary ==
Tennent retired from the ministry in 1762 due to chronic illness. In February 1764, Governor John Penn (governor) appointed Tennent to a delegation of civic leaders led by Benjamin Franklin and Tennent to meet with the Scotch-Irish vigilante group known as the Paxton Boys.

Scotch-Irish immigrants to Pennsylvania frequently squatted on indigenous territory. As a result they were the target of raids during the French and Indian War and Pontiac's War. In response, Reverend John Elder, a Presbyterian minister from Paxtang known as the "Fighting Parson," raised two companies of mounted associators. In December 1763, this group massacred 20 peaceable Susquehannock at Conestoga Town and Lancaster. In February 1764, the Paxton Boys led an armed march on Philadelphia with the intent of attacking the Moravian Lenape and Mohican who had been moved there for their protection.

The Paxton Boys halted their march in Germantown after learning about the sizable force that was prepared to meet them in Philadelphia. Following a day of negotiations, the marchers agreed to disperse after receiving assurances that their grievances would be presented to the Governor and Assembly.

== Family ==
Tennent married three times. His first wife died childless in 1740. Tennent then married Cornelia Clarkson (née de Peyster), a widow with several children. She died in 1753. Sometime before 1762 Tennent married another widow, Sarah Spofford, who had one daughter by her first husband. She had three children with Tennent; one of the two daughters was given the name of Tennent's second wife, Cornelia.

== Works ==
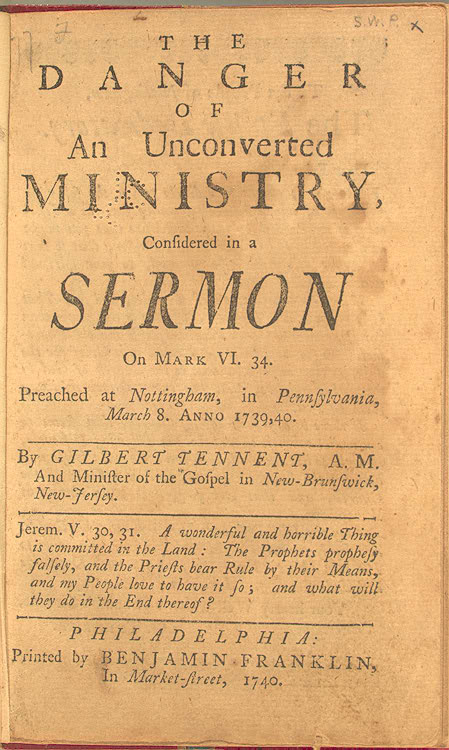
Gilbert Tennent's The Danger of an Unconverted Ministry published in 1740

Tennent had many of his sermons, as well as some of his other works, published by Benjamin Franklin and other Philadelphia printers. These include:

- The Danger of an Unconverted Ministry, Considered in a sermon on Mark VI. 34. Preached at Nottingham, in Pennsylvania, March 8, Anno 1739,40 (1740)
- The Examiner, examined, or, Gilbert Tennent, harmonious : in answer to a pamphlet entitled, The examiner, or Gilbert against Tennent (1743)
- Some Account of the Principles of the Moravians, Chiefly Collected from Several Conversations with Count Zinzendorf (1743)
- Twenty Three Sermons Upon the Chief End of Man: The Divine Authority of the Sacred Scriptures, the Being and Attributes of God, and the Doctrine of the Trinity (1744)
- The Late Association for defence farther encouraged, or, Defensive war defended, : and its consistency with true Christianity represented in a reply to some exceptions against war, in a late composure, intituled, The doctrine of Christianity, as held by the people called Quakers, vindicated. (1748)
- The Substance and Scope of Both Testaments; or, The Distinguishing Glory of the Gospel: A Sermon (1749)
- Irenicum Ecclesiasticum, or, a Humbly Impartial Essay upon the Peace of Jerusalum (1749)
- A Persuasive to the Right Use of the Passions in Religion; or, The Nature of Religious Zeal Explain’d, Its Excellency and Importance Open’d and Urg’d, in a Sermon, on Revelations iii.19. Preached at Philadelphia, January 27th, 1760 (1760)
