= Synod of the Trinity =

Coordinates: 40.24043°N 76.93311°W

- Formation: 1717, Philadelphia
- Type: Middle judicatory
- Headquarters: Mechanicsburg, Pennsylvania
- Region served: Pennsylvania, most of West Virginia, and Eastern Ohio
- Members: 105,733 (2026)
- Parent organization: Presbyterian Church (U.S.A.)
- Website: www.syntrinity.org
- Formerly called: Synod of Philadelphia, Synod of New York and Philadelphia, Synod of Pennsylvania, Synod of Pennsylvania-West Virginia

Synod of the Trinity is an upper judicatory of the Presbyterian Church headquartered in Camp Hill, Pennsylvania. The synod oversees sixteen presbyteries covering all of Pennsylvania, most of West Virginia, and a portion of eastern Ohio.

== History ==
The Presbyterian Church in the United States of America has its roots in the territory of the Synod of the Trinity, which was founded as the Synod of Philadelphia in 1717 following the division of the Presbytery of Philadelphia into three presbyteries (Philadelphia, New Castle, and Long Island), with the synod as a superior body. After the Presbytery of New Brunswick was expelled from the synod in 1741 during a major division in the church, Jonathan Dickinson left the synod in 1745 to form the Synod of New York. An advocate of the Great Awakening, Dickinson founded a seminary that later became Princeton University. The synod was reunited as the Synod of New York and Philadelphia in 1758.

By 1851, the synod, then known as the Synod of Philadelphia, was "one of the largest and most influential Synods in the Presbyterian Church, embracing the entire States of Delaware, Maryland, and the greater part of the State of Pennsylvania." By 1881, the synod consisted of nineteen Pennsylvania counties, the City of Philadelphia, and a portion of western Africa. In 1882, the name was changed to the Synod of Pennsylvania. When the General Assembly decided in 1973 to create regional judicatories, the synod was merged with the Synod of West Virginia to form the Synod of Pennsylvania-West Virginia. Finally, when church reunion occurred in 1983, presbyteries in a portion of eastern Ohio were joined to the synod and the name was changed to the Synod of the Trinity.

The Presbyterian Historical Society shows 81 Presbyterian/Reformed historic sites registered within the bounds of the synod.

== Presbyteries ==
Counties that are part of the Synod of the Trinity

There are 15 presbyteries in the synod.
