= Presbytery of New York =

Presbyterian organization

- Predecessor: Presbytery of Philadelphia
- Formation: 1717
- Type: Presbytery
- Region served: Province of New York and East Jersey
- Parent organization: Synod of Philadelphia
- Formerly called: Long Island Presbytery

The Presbytery of New York was a presbytery formed in 1717 as the Long Island Presbytery by the division of the Presbytery of Philadelphia into three sections. It covered the Province of New York. It was merged with the Presbytery of East Jersey in 1738 and renamed the Presbytery of New York.
