= Presbytery of Philadelphia =

Coordinates: 40.07089°N 75.18451°W

- Formation: 1706
- Type: Presbytery
- Headquarters: Philadelphia
- Region served: Greater Philadelphia
- Parent organization: Synod of the Trinity
- Website: presbyphl.org

The Presbytery of Philadelphia, known during its early years simply as the Presbytery or the General Presbytery, is a presbytery of the Presbyterian Church (U.S.A.). It was the first organized presbytery in what was to become the United States.

== History ==
By the 1700s, several Presbyterian congregations had been organized in colonial America, but they were "autonomous congregations ... without a presbytery." In the spring of 1706, seven ministers organized the first presbytery in America and chose Francis Makemie to be its moderator. The founding ministers came from diverse backgrounds. Samuel Davies of Lewes on the Delaware was a merchant and pastor originally from Ireland. George McNish, Scottish, and John Hampton, Scots-Irish, had originally been sent to the colonies by the Moravians. Nathaniel Taylor of Patuxent, Maryland; Jedediah Andrews of Philadelphia; and John Wilson of New Castle were originally from New England. Makemie was Scots-Irish, educated in Scotland, and had strong ties with Presbyterians in both England and New England.

At its founding, the presbytery's main function was to provide a forum for promoting the advancement of religion and the improvement of ministerial abilities. As time went on, the presbytery began to oversee the ordination, installation and discipline of ministers as well as managing the relationship between ministers and congregations. It was this presbytery that conducted the first Presbyterian ordination in America, that of John Boyd. While it met in Philadelphia, member churches were located in New Jersey, Pennsylvania, Delaware, and Maryland.

By 1716, there were seventeen Presbyterian ministers in America. That year, the presbytery divided itself into three new presbyteries and established the Synod of Philadelphia as a superior body. The newly constituted Presbytery of Philadelphia then covered the provinces of East and West Jersey and all of Pennsylvania north of the Great Valley.

== Citations ==
=== References ===
- Balmer, Randall Herbert; Fitzmier, John R. (1994). The Presbyterians. Denominations in America. Vol. 5. Praeger. ISBN 0313260842.
- Loetscher, Lefferts A. (1983). A Brief History of the Presbyterians (Fourth ed.).
- Nevin, Alfred (1888). History of the presbytery of Philadelphia, and of the Philadelphia Central.
- Patterson, R.M. (1876). Historical Sketch of the Synod of Philadelphia. pp. 8–9.
- Thompson, Robert Ellis (1895). A History of the Presbyterian Churches in the United States. The Christian Literature Company.
