= List of moderators of the General Assembly of the United Presbyterian Church of North America =

The office of the Moderator of the General Assembly was the highest elected position in the United Presbyterian Church of North America (UPCNA). The Moderator was responsible for presiding over the meeting of the General Assembly, which was held annually between 1858 and 1958. After the meeting, which lasted for about a week, the Moderator served as an ambassador of the denomination throughout the remainder of the term. After completing the term, most former Moderators took on the role of a church statesman.

The chart below shows the Moderators, and the place of meetings, from 1858 when the PCUS was formed by the union of the Northern branch of the Associate Reformed Presbyterian Church with the Associate Presbyterian Church, until 1958 when the UPCNA merged with the Presbyterian Church in the United States of America to form the United Presbyterian Church in the United States of America.

== Moderators of UPCNA General Assemblies ==
Number and Year	Place of Meeting	Moderator	Online Minutes
1st GA, 1858	Pittsburgh, Pennsylvania	The Rev. John T. Pressly, D.D.	Minutes not available online
2nd GA, 1859	Xenia, Ohio	The Rev. Peter Bullions, D.D.	Minutes of the 1859 General Assembly
3rd GA, 1860	Philadelphia, Pennsylvania	The Rev. Joseph Clokey, D.D.	Minutes of the 1860 General Assembly
4th GA, 1861	Monmouth, Illinois	The Rev. R. D. Harper, D.D.	Minutes of the 1861 General Assembly
5th GA, 1862	Pittsburgh, Pennsylvania	The Rev. J. T. Cooper, D.D., LL.D.	Minutes not available online
6th GA, 1863	Xenia, Ohio	The Rev. A. Young, D.D., LL.D.	Minutes of the 1863 General Assembly
7th GA, 1864	Philadelphia, Pennsylvania	The Rev. D. A. Wallace, D.D., LL.D.	Minutes of the 1864 General Assembly
8th GA, 1865	Washington, Iowa	The Rev. John B. Clark, D.D.	Minutes of the 1865 General Assembly
9th GA, 1866	Allegheny, Pennsylvania	The Rev. David R. Kerr, D.D., LL.D.	Minutes of the 1866 General Assembly
10th GA, 1867	Xenia, Ohio	The Rev. John B. Dales, D.D., LL.D.	Minutes of the 1867 General Assembly
11th GA, 1868	Argyle, New York	The Rev. James Harper, D.D., LL.D.	Minutes of the 1868 General Assembly
12th GA, 1869	Monmouth, Illinois	The Rev. R. A. Browne, D.D., LL.D.	Minutes of the 1869 General Assembly
13th GA, 1870	Pittsburgh, Pennsylvania	The Rev. T. S. Kendall, D.D.	Minutes of the 1870 General Assembly
14th GA, 1871	Xenia, Ohio	The Rev. R. A. McAyeal, D.D.	Minutes of the 1871 General Assembly
15th GA, 1872	Washington, Iowa	The Rev. John S. Easton, D.D.	Minutes of the 1872 General Assembly
16th GA, 1873	Philadelphia, Pennsylvania	The Rev. John Y. Scouller, D.D.	Minutes of the 1873 General Assembly
17th GA, 1874	Monmouth, Illinois	The Rev. John G. Brown, D.D.	Minutes of the 1874 General Assembly
18th GA, 1875	Wooster, Ohio	The Rev. W. W. Barr, D.D.	Minutes of the 1875 General Assembly
19th GA, 1876	Philadelphia, Pennsylvania	The Rev. James Brown, D.D.	Minutes of the 1876 General Assembly
20th GA, 1877	Sparta, Illinois	The Rev. Robert B. Ewing, D.D.	Minutes of the 1877 General Assembly
21st GA, 1878	Cambridge, Ohio	The Rev. S. G. Irvine, D.D.	Minutes of the 1878 General Assembly
22nd GA, 1879	New Wilmington, Pennsylvania	The Rev. William Bruce, D.D.	Minutes of the 1879 General Assembly
23rd GA, 1880	Xenia, Ohio	The Rev. E. T. Jeffers, D.D., LL.D.	Minutes of the 1880 General Assembly
24th GA, 1881	Allegheny, Pennsylvania	The Rev. David W. Carson, D.D.	Minutes of the 1881 General Assembly
25th GA, 1882	Monmouth, Illinois	The Rev. David Paul, D.D.	Minutes of the 1882 General Assembly
26th GA, 1883	Pittsburgh, Pennsylvania	The Rev. W. H. McMilan, D.D., LL.D.	Minutes of the 1883 General Assembly
27th GA, 1884	St. Louis, Missouri	The Rev. William H. French, D.D.	Minutes of the 1884 General Assembly
28th GA, 1885	Topeka, Kansas	The Rev. William Johnston, D.D.	Minutes of the 1885 General Assembly
29th GA, 1886	Hamilton, Ohio	The Rev. John T. Brownlee, D.D.	Minutes of the 1886 General Assembly
30th GA, 1887	Philadelphia, Pennsylvania	The Rev. Matthew M. Gibson, D.D.	Minutes not available online
31st GA, 1888	Cedar Rapids, Iowa	The Rev. William T. Meloy, D.D., LL.D.	Minutes not available online
32nd GA, 1889	Springfield, Ohio	The Rev. E. S. McKitrick, D.D.	Minutes not available online
33rd GA, 1890	Buffalo, New York	The Rev. Andrew Watson, D.D., LL.D.	Minutes not available online
34th GA, 1891	Princeton, Indiana	The Rev. Thomas J. Kennedy, D.D.	Minutes not available online
35th GA, 1892	Allegheny, Pennsylvania	The Rev. David MacDill, D.D., LL.D.	Minutes not available online
36th GA, 1893	Monmouth, Illinois	The Rev. James Bruce, D.D.	Minutes of the 1893 General Assembly
37th GA, 1894	Albany, Oregon	The Rev. John A. Wilson, D.D., LL.D.	Minutes of the 1894 General Assembly
38th GA, 1895	Pittsburgh, Pennsylvania	The Rev. J. B. McMichael, D.D.	Minutes of the 1895 General Assembly
39th GA, 1896	Xenia, Ohio	The Rev. James White, D.D.	Minutes of the 1896 General Assembly
40th GA, 1897	Rock Island, Illinois	The Rev. Thomas H. Hanna, D.D.	Minutes of the 1897 General Assembly
41st GA, 1898	Omaha, Nebraska	The Rev. R. G. Ferguson, D.D., LL.D.	Minutes of the 1898 General Assembly
42nd GA, 1899	Philadelphia, Pennsylvania	The Rev. William J. Robinson, D.D., LL.D.	Minutes of the 1899 General Assembly
43rd GA, 1900	Chicago, Illinois	The Rev. James P. Sankey, D.D.	Minutes of the 1900 General Assembly
44th GA, 1901	Des Moines, Iowa	The Rev. J. A. Thompson, L.H.D., D.D., LL.D.	Minutes of the 1901 General Assembly
45th GA, 1902	Allegheny, Pennsylvania	The Rev. James C. Wilson, D.D., LL.D.	Minutes of the 1902 General Assembly
46th GA, 1903	Tarkio, Missouri	The Rev. James P. Cowan, D.D.	Minutes of the 1903 General Assembly
47th GA, 1904	Greenville, Pennsylvania	The Rev. James W. Witherspoon, D.D.	Minutes of the 1904 General Assembly
48th GA, 1905	Washington, Iowa	The Rev. William C. Williamson, D.D., LL.D.	Minutes of the 1905 General Assembly
49th GA, 1906	Richmond, Indiana	The Rev. J. K. McClurkin, D.D., LL.D.	Minutes of the 1906 General Assembly
50th GA, 1907	Denver, Colorado	The Rev. William T. Campbell, D.D.	Minutes not available online
51st GA, 1908	Pittsburgh, Pennsylvania	The Rev. James G. Carson, D.D., LL.D.	Minutes not available online
52nd GA, 1909	Knoxville, Tennessee	The Rev. D. A. McClenahan, D.D., LL.D.	Minutes not available online
53rd GA, 1910	Philadelphia, Pennsylvania	The Rev. James D. Rankin, D.D., LL.D.	Minutes not available online
54th GA, 1911	Washington, Pennsylvania	The Rev. John C. Scouller, D.D.	Minutes not available online
55th GA, 1912	Seattle, Washington	The Rev. Hugh H. Bell, D.D.	Minutes not available online
56th GA, 1913	Atlanta, Georgia	The Rev. R. M. Russell, D.D., LL.D.	Minutes not available online
57th GA, 1914	New Castle, Pennsylvania	The Rev. Joseph Kyle, D.D., LL.D.	Minutes not available online
58th GA, 1915	Loveland, Colorado	The Rev. Thomas Hanna McMichael, D.D., LL.D.	Minutes not available online
59th GA, 1916	Cleveland, Ohio	The Rev. W. B. Smiley, D.D.	Minutes not available online
60th GA, 1917	Boston, Massachusetts	The Rev. W. E. McCulloch, D.D.	Minutes not available online
61st GA, 1918	Pittsburgh, Pennsylvania	The Rev. W. M. Anderson, D.D.	Minutes not available online
62nd GA, 1919	Monmouth, Illinois	The Rev. James T. McCrory, D.D.	Minutes not available online
63rd GA, 1920	Sterling, Kansas	The Rev. F. M. Spencer, D.D., LL.D.	Minutes not available online
64th GA, 1921	Philadelphia, Pennsylvania	The Rev. A. F. Kirkpatrick, D.D.	Minutes not available online
65th GA, 1922	Cambridge, Ohio	The Rev. J. Kelly Giffen, D.D.	Minutes not available online
66th GA, 1923	Buffalo, New York	The Rev. W. R. Sawhill, D.D.	Minutes not available online
67th GA, 1924	Richmond, Indiana	The Rev. Charles H. Robinson, D.D.	Minutes not available online
68th GA, 1925	Topeka, Kansas	The Rev. W. I. Wishart, D.D.	Minutes not available online
69th GA, 1926	Sharon, Pennsylvania	The Rev. R. A. Hutchison, D.D., LL.D.	Minutes not available online
70th GA, 1927	Washington, D.C.	The Rev. M. G. Kyle, D.D., LL.D.	Minutes not available online
71st GA, 1928	St. Louis, Missouri	The Rev. William A. Spalding, D.D.	Minutes not available online
72nd GA, 1929	Pittsburgh, Pennsylvania	The Rev. John McNaugher, DD, LLD, Litt.D.	Minutes not available online
73rd GA, 1930	Des Moines, Iowa	The Rev. T. C. Atchison, D.D.	Minutes not available online
74th GA, 1931	Youngstown, Ohio	The Rev. J. Knox Montgomery, DD, LL.D.	Minutes not available online
75th GA, 1932	Beaver, Pennsylvania	The Rev. Charles S. Cleland, D.D.	Minutes not available online
76th GA, 1933	Pittsburgh, Pennsylvania	The Rev. W. B. Anderson, D.D., LL.D.	Minutes not available online
77th GA, 1934	Oxford, Ohio	The Rev. J. Alvin Orr, D.D., LL.D.	Minutes not available online
78th GA, 1935	Akron, Ohio	The Rev. E. C. McCown, D.D.	Minutes not available online
79th GA, 1936	Pittsburg, Kansas	The Rev. Robert W. Thompson, DD, LL.D.	Minutes not available online
80th GA, 1937	Oak Park, Illinois	The Rev. A. R. Robinson, D.D., LL.D.	Minutes not available online
81st GA, 1938	Cleveland, Ohio	The Rev. Ralph Atkinson, D.D.	Minutes not available online
82nd GA, 1939	Philadelphia, Pennsylvania	Elder H. Walton Mitchell, LL.D.	Minutes not available online
83rd GA, 1940	Buffalo, New York	The Rev. Homer B. Henderson, D.D.	Minutes not available online
84th GA, 1941	Indianapolis, Indiana	The Rev. R. L. Lanning, D.D., LL.D.	Minutes not available online
85th GA, 1942	Columbus, Ohio	The Rev. Thomas C. Pollock, D.D.	Minutes not available online
86th GA, 1943	New Wilmington, Pennsylvania	The Rev. W. Bruce Wilson, D.D.	Minutes not available online
87th GA, 1944	New Concord, Ohio	The Rev. James H. Grier, D.D., LL.D.	Minutes not available online
88th GA, 1945	Monmouth, Illinois	The Rev. James M. Ferguson, D.D.	Minutes not available online
89th GA, 1946	Tarkio, Missouri	The Rev. Lytle Rodgers Free, D.D.	Minutes not available online
90th GA, 1947	Sterling, Kansas	Elder Samuel A. Fulton, LL.D.	Minutes not available online
91st GA, 1948	New Wilmington, Pennsylvania	The Rev. Albert H. Baldinger, D.D.	Minutes not available online
92nd GA, 1949	Buck Hill Falls, Pennsylvania	Elder Tim J. Campbell, LL.D.	Minutes not available online
93rd GA, 1950	New Concord, Ohio	The Rev. J. Lowrie Anderson, D.D.	Minutes not available online
94th GA, 1951	Des Moines, Iowa	Elder W. Kyle George, LL.D.	Minutes not available online
95th GA, 1952	Albany, Oregon	The Rev. James Leon Kelso, D.D., Th.D., LL.D.	Minutes not available online
96th GA, 1953	Carlisle, Pennsylvania	The Rev. Samuel C. Weir, D.D.	Minutes not available online
97th GA, 1954	Akron, Ohio	The Rev. Albert E. Kelly, D.D., LL.D.	Minutes not available online
98th GA, 1955	Monmouth, Illinois	The Rev. George A. Long, D.D., LL.D., Litt.D.	Minutes not available online
99th GA, 1956	Knoxville, Tennessee	The Rev. Robert W. Gibson, D.D., LL.D.	Minutes not available online
100th GA, 1957	New Concord, Ohio	The Rev. Robert N. Montgomery, D.D., LL.D.	Minutes not available online
101st GA, 1958	Pittsburgh, Pennsylvania	The Rev. Robert N. Montgomery, D.D., LL.D.	Minutes not available online

== See also ==
- List of moderators of the General Assembly of the United Presbyterian Church in the United States of America
- List of moderators of the General Assembly of the Presbyterian Church (USA)
- List of moderators of the General Assembly of the Presbyterian Church in the United States
