= United Presbyterian =

United Presbyterian may refer to:

- United Presbyterian Church of North America
- United Presbyterian Church of Scotland
- United Presbyterian Church in the United States of America
