= NWAC =

NWAC may refer to:

- National War Aims Committee, cross-party parliamentary organisation established to conduct propaganda within Britain during World War 1
- Native Women's Association of Canada
- Naval War: Arctic Circle, a naval strategy computer game
- New Wineskins Association of Churches, a group of about 200 Presbyterian churches in conflict with the Presbyterian Church (US)
- Northwest Airlines
- Northwest Athletic Conference, a sports association
