= CIMUN =

CIMUN may refer to:

- COMSATS International Model United Nations
- Cairo International Model United Nations
- Chicago International Model United Nations
