= Heather J. Sharkey =

American historian (born 1967)

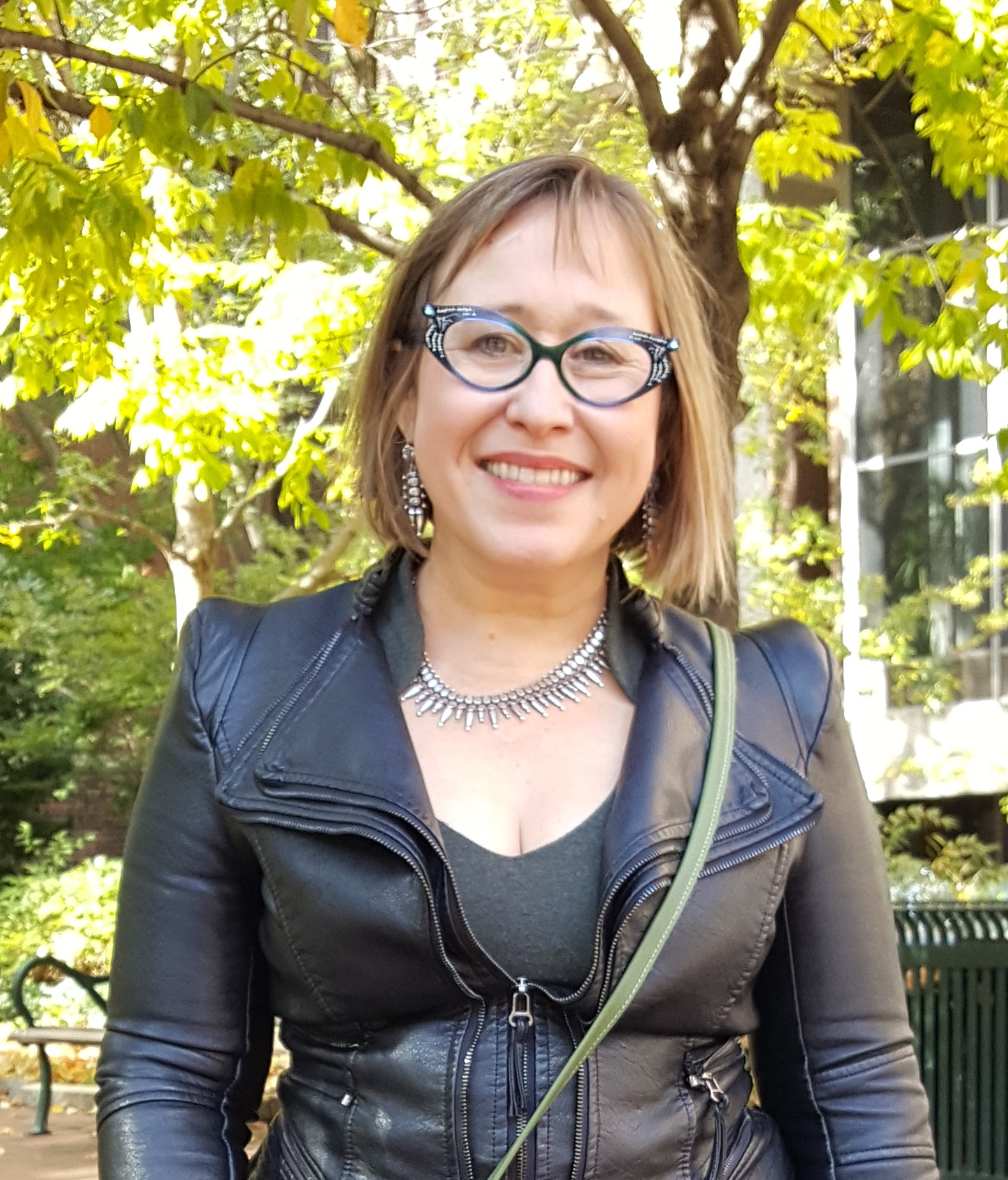
- Education: Yale University (B.A. Anthropology); Durham University (M.Phil. Modern Middle Eastern Studies); Princeton University (Ph.D. History)
- Employer: University of Pennsylvania
- Title: Professor

Heather J. Sharkey (born 1967) is an American historian of the modern Middle East and Africa. She has written books and articles on nationalism, imperialism, colonialism, postcolonial studies, missionary movements, religious communities, language politics, and the history of food in Egypt, Sudan, and elsewhere. She is a Professor in the Department of Middle Eastern Languages and Cultures at the University of Pennsylvania.

== Early life and education ==
Born in New Jersey, Sharkey was raised in Manalapan Township, New Jersey. She graduated from Peddie School, and then won a scholarship from the English-Speaking Union to attend Culford School in Bury St. Edmunds, England, for one year. She attended Yale University, where she received a bachelor's degree in anthropology, summa cum laude, and was a member of Phi Beta Kappa. She won a Marshall Scholarship from the British government and attended Durham University, where she earned an MPhil degree in Modern Middle East Studies. She pursued her PhD in History at Princeton University, where she specialized in the study of modern Africa and modern Islamic thought. Her dissertation, supervised by Robert L. Tignor, received Honorable Mention for the Malcolm H. Kerr Dissertation Award in the humanities from the Middle East Studies Association (MESA).

== Career ==
=== Academia ===
Sharkey taught at the University of Massachusetts, Amherst from 1997 to 1998, Massachusetts Institute of Technology (MIT) from 1998 to 2000, and Trinity College in Hartford, Connecticut, from 2000 to 2002. In 2002 she joined the faculty of the University of Pennsylvania, where she later served as Chair of the Department of Near Eastern Languages & Civilizations from 2021 to 2024. She was a visiting professor (Professeur Invité) at the Institut d’études de l’Islam et des sociétés du monde musulman (IISMM) of the École des Hautes Études en Sciences Sociales (EHESS) in Paris from 2012 to 2013. In the 2024-25 year, she was an Oliver Smithies Visiting Fellow at Balliol College, University of Oxford, and a Senior Fellow in the Faculty of Arts at the University of Groningen in the Netherlands. In the same year, she served on the inaugural advisory committee of the "Humanities and Social Justice" initiative of the Wiki Education Foundation.

=== Books and essays ===
Sharkey's first book, Living with Colonialism: Nationalism and Culture in the Anglo-Egyptian Sudan, appeared from the University of California Press in 2003, and received Honorable Mention for the Albert Hourani Book Award of the Middle East Studies Association (MESA). It has also appeared in Arabic, translated by Badreldin 'Ali in 2023. This book examines how nationalism emerged among a generation of Sudanese Muslim thinkers who worked by day for the British colonial regime, holding mundane jobs, and who gathered by night to compose Arabic poetry and to write essays that enabled them to imagine the Sudan as a land and nation. The book shows how everyday experiences of colonial rule gave rise to cultures of nationalism.

Sharkey's second book, American Evangelicals in Egypt: Missionary Encounters in an Age of Empire, appeared from Princeton University Press in 2008. This book studies the history of the American Presbyterian missionaries who, from 1854 to 1967, ran the largest Protestant mission in Egypt, operating schools, hospitals, and other institutions that appealed to Egyptians Christians and Muslims alike. Sharkey shows how these American missionaries influenced Egyptian society in far-reaching ways, even in the absence of conversions, and how experiences in Egypt reciprocally influenced the missionaries and the church that sent them, with consequences for American Protestant culture and U.S.-Egyptian relations.

Cambridge University Press published Sharkey's third book, A History of Muslims, Christians, and Jews in the Middle East, in 2017. Written for Cambridge's Contemporary Middle East series, this book appeals to an audience of general educated readers as well as Middle East history specialists. This book shows how Islamic states – and especially the modern Ottoman state – managed religious diversity while devising specific policies towards Muslims, Christians, Jews and members of other religious groups. Sharkey closely studies Ottoman policies towards non-Muslims as dhimmis – protected people subordinate to Muslims in Islamic societies. She considers how these policies evolved or persisted amid social changes and reforms of the nineteenth century, some of which ostensibly tried to promote religious equality while advancing ideas about citizenship. Ultimately, she considers how religion “worked” as a framework for government and society, and how it shaped social attitudes and expectations in the years leading up to World War I, with consequences for the Middle East in the twentieth and early 21st centuries.

Sharkey's fourth monograph, Crossing Continents: Global Microhistory from Egypt and the Sudan, appeared from Bloomsbury Academic in 2026. Crossing Continents views seven individuals through the lens of global microhistory, a way of using small details or sources to illuminate much larger historical developments. The seven featured individuals include a giraffe, two soldiers, a doctor, a maharani, an archaeologist, and accountant. Spanning two centuries from roughly the 1820s to the present, the book asks: who or what counts as important in history, and how can or should we narrate the past?

Sharkey has published five volumes of essays. The first, co-edited with Mehmet Ali Doğan of Istanbul Technical University, is American Missionaries in the Modern Middle East: Foundational Encounters, which was published by University of Utah Press in 2011. The second, Cultural Conversions: Unexpected Consequences of Christian Missionary Encounters in the Middle East, Africa, and South Asia, appeared from Syracuse University Press in 2013. Building on this work, Sharkey wrote many articles on the history of Christian missions and world Christianity. With Jeffrey Edward Green, she published The Changing Terrain of Religious Freedom, which appeared from the University of Pennsylvania Press in 2021. With Karène Sanchez Summerer, she edited Commensality and Cultural Heritage: Bringing the Foodways of the Middle East and Its Diasporas to the Table, which the University of Groningen Press in the Netherlands published in 2025 in print and as a digital Open Access edition. Sharkey edited her fifth volume with Karène Sanchez Summerer and José Rafael Medeiros Coelho. Entitled, Sharing the Table: Culinary Journeys from the Middle East to the North of the Netherlands and the World, it appeared in 2026, again from the University of Groningen Press, in both print and digital Open Access editions.

With Elena Vezzadini (CNRS, Institut des mondes africaines [IMAF], Paris) and Iris Seri-Hersch (Université d’Aix-Marseille), she edited in 2015 a special issue of the Canadian Journal of African Studies, on the theme of “Rethinking Sudan Studies” after the 2011 secession of South Sudan. Her own article in this collection traces the life and “afterlives” of a giraffe who went from Sudan to France in 1826 (and whose skeleton still stands on display in the Muséum d'Histoire naturelle de La Rochelle). This article contributes to the study of Franco-Sudanese relations and environmental history in the Nile Valley.

== Grants and awards ==
After graduating from Yale in 1990, Sharkey held a Marshall Scholarship at Durham University. She studied Arabic at the American University in Cairo, first as an undergraduate in the summer program of the Center for Arabic Study Abroad (CASA), and later as an assistant professor at Trinity College, in the CASA III summer program for faculty.

Sharkey has won grants from The American-Scandinavian Foundation, the American Philosophical Society, and other organizations. She has been a recipient of a Fulbright-Hays Fellowship, Whiting Fellowship in the Humanities, Josephine De Kármán Fellowship, and Carnegie Scholars Fellowship. She won the Charles Ludwig Distinguished Teaching Award from the College of Arts and Sciences of the University of Pennsylvania in 2011. In 2022, she was a Scholar in Residence at the Library of Congress, African and Middle Eastern division for a Lilly Endowment-supported initiative on Exploring Challenging Conversations and National Religious Literacy.
