= Edler Garnet Hawkins =

American Presbyterian minister

The Reverend Edler Garnet Hawkins
- Moderator of the General Assembly
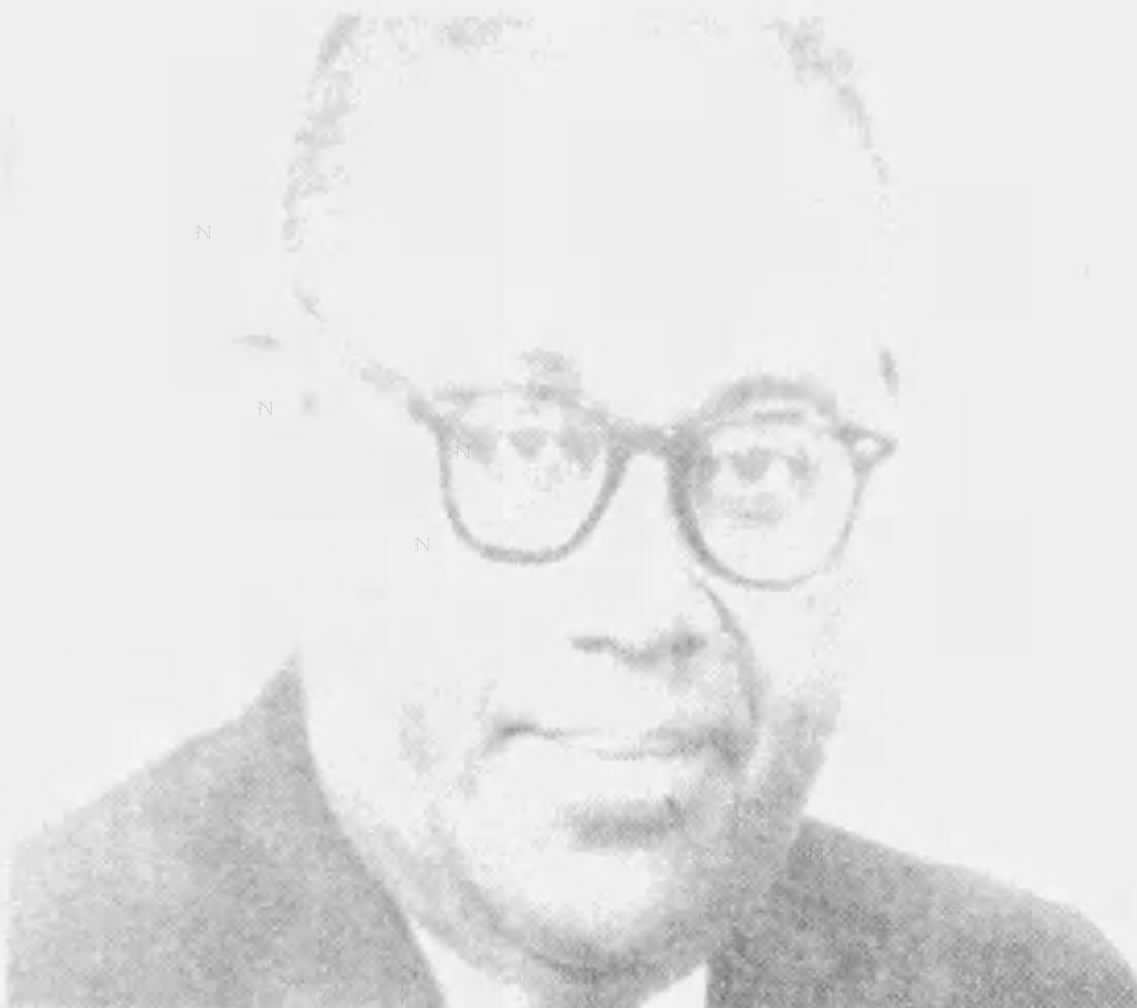
- Church: United Presbyterian Church in the United States of America
- In office: 1964
- Predecessor: Silas G. Kessler
- Successor: William P. Thompson

Personal details
- Born: 1908
- Died: 1977 (aged 68–69)
- Education: Bloomfield College; Union Seminary in New York City

Edler Garnet Hawkins (1908–1977) was a Presbyterian minister from New York City. He is known for his ecumenical work and for being the first African American to serve as Moderator of the General Assembly for the United Presbyterian Church in the United States of America.

== History ==
=== Early life and ministry ===
Edler Garnet Hawkins was born in the Bronx in 1908 to parents who had moved to New York City from North Carolina and Virginia. He had four siblings, of whom two died in infancy. As a child, Hawkins worked as a housepainter and attended high school in the Bronx. Following this, Hawkins enrolled as an undergraduate at Bloomfield College in New Jersey and later enrolled in the Union Seminary in New York City in order to become a minister. Among his mentors and influences at the seminary were President Henry Sloane Coffin, Reinhold Niebuhr, Paul Tillich, and Harry F. Ward. He graduated from the seminary in 1938 and was invited to become the organizing pastor for St. Augustine Presbyterian Church in the Bronx. The church, which during the 1930s served a mostly white congregation, was in a neighborhood experiencing a racial transformation, and a congregant of the church had convinced them to invite an African American minister to the church.

As minister at St. Augustine, Hawkins was given a large degree of freedom in his style of ministry, and shortly after his arrival, he used his position to attack the "Bronx slave market," an exploitative market in the Bronx where African American women were hired as domestic workers for low pay. As minister, Hawkins, who had garnered the nickname of "Renaissance Man," oversaw the growth of St. Augustine from a small church to a significant institution in the Harlem–Bronx community, with over 1,000 members. At one point, Sammy Davis Jr. performed a benefit concert at Carnegie Hall to help the church.

=== Ecumenicism and later life ===
Following World War II, Hawkins became more involved on a national level within the Presbyterian Church in the United States of America. He supported numerous ecumenical groups, including the World Council of Churches, the Federal Council of Churches, and the National Council of Churches. For the latter, he represented the Presbyterian faction in that group. In 1958, Hawkins was elected moderator of the Presbytery of New York, and in 1964, he became the first African American elected as the Moderator of the General Assembly for the United Presbyterian Church in the United States of America (UPCUSA). While Moderator, he became the first Protestant leader from the United States to visit the pope when Pope Paul VI received him in August that year. Following his term as moderator, Hawkins attended the 1968 Assembly of the World Council of Churches in Uppsala, Sweden as the UPCUSA's representative. He would later be elected to that organization's Central Committee in 1974, where he played a major role in defending the council's Programme to Combat Racism.

In 1971, Hawkins accepted a position as professor at Princeton Seminary for practical theology and black studies. Hawkins died several years later in 1977.

== See also ==
- List of moderators of the General Assembly of the United Presbyterian Church in the United States of America
