= Shems Friedlander =

American Islamic scholar (1940–2022)

Shems Friedlander (January 8, 1940 - November 22, 2022) was an American Islamic scholar, Sufi master, visual artist, filmmaker, author and an emeritus professor of practice at the American University in Cairo. He was best known for his works on mystical traditions of Islam, especially the Mevlevi Sufi tradition founded after the name of Mevlana Jalāl ad-Dīn Muhammad Rūmī.

== Biography ==
Friedlander received his education from the Massachusetts College of Art and graduated in 1963. He began his career as a graphic designer. In his early years, he learned about Sufism from Vilayet Inayet Khan, son of the Sufi Sheikh Inayet Khan. This led him to Muzaffer Ozak Efendi and, through conversion, ultimately to Islam in early 1970s. Later, he became a member of the Mevlevi Sufi order. Joining as a lecturer, Friedlander has served as a professor in the Department of Journalism and Mass Communication at the American University in Cairo since 1994. In 2012, he was named as one of the 500 most influential Muslims in the world. Friedlander died in Istanbul on November 22, 2022, at the age of 82.

== Works ==
Apart from photography and paintings, Friedlander has authored ten books on Sufism and Mevlana Rumi and has made few documentary films. His works have been translated into many different languages including Arabic and Turkish.

=== Books ===
- The Whirling Dervishes, Being an Account of the Sufi Order Known as the Mevlevis and Its Founder the Poet and Mystic Mevlana Jalalu'ddin Rumi, Macmillan (New York, NY, 1975)
- Submission: Sayings of the Prophet Muhammad, hadith notations by Al-Hajj Shaikh Muzaffereddin, Harper and Row (New York, NY, 1977)
- Ninety-Nine Names of Allah, Harper and Row (New York, NY, 1978)
- When You Hear Hoofbeats, Think of a Zebra: Talks on Sufism, Perennial Library (New York, NY, 1987)
- Sunlight, Poems, and Other Words, Safina Books (Cairo, Egypt, 1997)
- Rumi: The Hidden Treasure, Fons Vitae (Louisville, KY, 2001)
- Winter Harvest, a Memoir (2015)
- The Forgotten Message of Mevlana Jalaluddin Rumi (2017)

=== Documentary films ===
- Rumi: The Wings of Love (2002)
- The Circles of Remembrance (2005)
- Faisal: Legacy of a King (2011)
