= American University in Cairo =

Independent university in New Cairo, Egypt

The American University in Cairo
- الجامعة الأمريكية بالقاهرة
- Other name: AUC
- Motto: Driven by Excellence.
- Type: Private
- Established: 1919
- Founder: Charles Watson
- Endowment: $535.5 million (2019)
- President: Ahmad S. Dallal
- Provost: Ehab Abdel-Rahman
- Faculty: 467 full-time and 149 part-time (45% international faculty)
- Students: 6,980 (from 69 countries, 59% female)
- Undergraduates: 5,755
- Postgraduates: 1,225
- Other students: 31,127 (continuing education)
- Location: New Cairo, Egypt; 30°01′10″N 31°29′59″E
- Campus: Main campus in New Cairo, and the old campus in Tahrir Square
- Language: English
- Colors: Federal blue
- Mascot: The Eagle Horus
- Website: aucegypt.edu

The American University in Cairo (AUC; Arabic: الجامعة الأمريكية بالقاهرة, romanized: al-Jāmi‘a al-’Amrīkiyya bi-l-Qāhira) is a private liberal arts university in New Cairo, Egypt. The university offers American-style learning programs at undergraduate, graduate, and professional levels, along with a continuing education program. It is accredited by the Middle States Commission on Higher Education in the United States and Egypt's National Authority for Quality Assurance and Assessment of Education.

== History ==
The American University in Cairo was founded in 1919 by the American Mission in Egypt, a Protestant mission sponsored by the United Presbyterian Church of North America, as an English-language university and preparatory school. University founder Charles A. Watson wanted to establish a western institution for higher education.

The preparatory school opened to 142 students on October 5, 1920, in Khairy Pasha Palace, which was built in the 1860s. The first diplomas issued were junior college-level certificates given to 20 students in 1923.

There were disputes between Watson, who was interested in building the university's academic reputation, and United Presbyterian leaders in the United States who sought to return the university to its Christian roots. Four years later, Watson decided that the university could not afford to maintain its original religious ties and that its best hope was the promotion of good moral and ethical behavior.

Originally limited to male students, the university enrolled its first female student in 1928. That same year, the university graduated its first class, with two Bachelor of Arts and one Bachelor of Sciences degrees awarded.

In 1950, AUC added its first graduate programs to its ongoing Bachelor of Arts, Bachelor of Sciences, graduate diploma, and continuing education programs, and in 1951, phased out the preparatory school program. During the Six-Day War, AUC was seized by the Egyptian government and was placed under control by Egyptian administrators for the next seven years; most of its American faculty were forced to leave the country. Egypt stopped short of nationalizing the university, which was supported by money owed as repayment of loans made by the U.S. Agency for International Development. The government returned control to American administrators on June 12, 1974, coinciding with a visit to Cairo by U.S. president Richard Nixon. By the mid-1970s, the university offered a broad range of liberal arts and sciences programs. In the following years, the university added bachelors, masters, and diploma programs in engineering, management, computer science, journalism and mass communication and sciences programs, as well as establishing a number of research centers in strategic areas, including business, the social sciences, philanthropy and civic engagement, and science and technology. In the 1950s, the university also changed its name from The American University at Cairo, replacing "at" with "in."

The American University in Cairo Press was established in 1960. By 2016, it was publishing up to 80 books annually.

In 1978, the university established the Desert Development Center to promote sustainable development in Egypt's reclaimed desert areas. The Desert Development Center's legacy is being carried forward by the Research Institute for a Sustainable Environment.

Faculty voted "no confidence" in university president Francis J. Ricciardone in February 2019. In a letter to the president, the faculty cited "low morale, complaints about his management style, grievances over contracts and accusations of illegal discrimination" with tensions further increasing when Ricciardone invited U.S. Secretary of State Mike Pompeo to give a speech at the university.

On February 11, 2019, the Board of Trustees of the American University in Cairo reaffirmed its continued confidence and unqualified support for President Francis J. Ricciardone. In May 2019, it extended his tenure to June 2024. Ricciardone retired June 2021.

The board of trustees announced their appointment of Ahmad S. Dallal as the university's 13th president on June 22, 2021.

On March 1, 2025, the United States' Department of Government Efficiency (DOGE) announced the termination of over $171 million in research grants from the United States Agency for International Development (USAID) for the American University in Cairo. DOGE stated they saved the U.S. federal government $101,396,775 from wasteful spending by the American University in Cairo.

== Campus ==
=== Tahrir Square campus ===
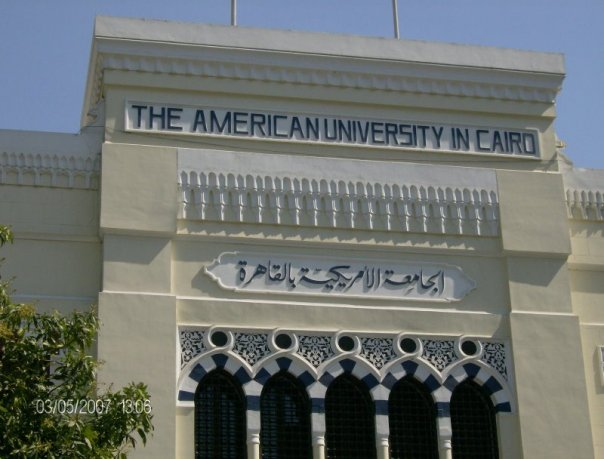
Tahrir Square Campus

AUC was originally established in Tahrir Square in downtown Cairo. The 7.8-acre Tahrir Square campus was developed around the Khairy Pasha Palace. Built in the neo-Mamluk style, the palace inspired an architectural style that has been replicated throughout Cairo. Ewart Hall was established in 1928, named for William Dana Ewart, the father of an American visitor to the campus, who made a gift of $100,000 towards the cost of construction on the condition that she remain anonymous. The structure was designed by A. St. John Diament, abutting the south side of the Palace. The central portion of the building houses an auditorium large enough to seat 1,200, as well as classrooms, offices and exhibition galleries. The school's continued growth required additional space, and in 1932, a new building was dedicated to house the School of Oriental Studies. East of Ewart Hall, the building featured Oriental Hall, an auditorium and reception room built and decorated in an adaptation of traditional styles, yet responsive to the architectural style of its own time.

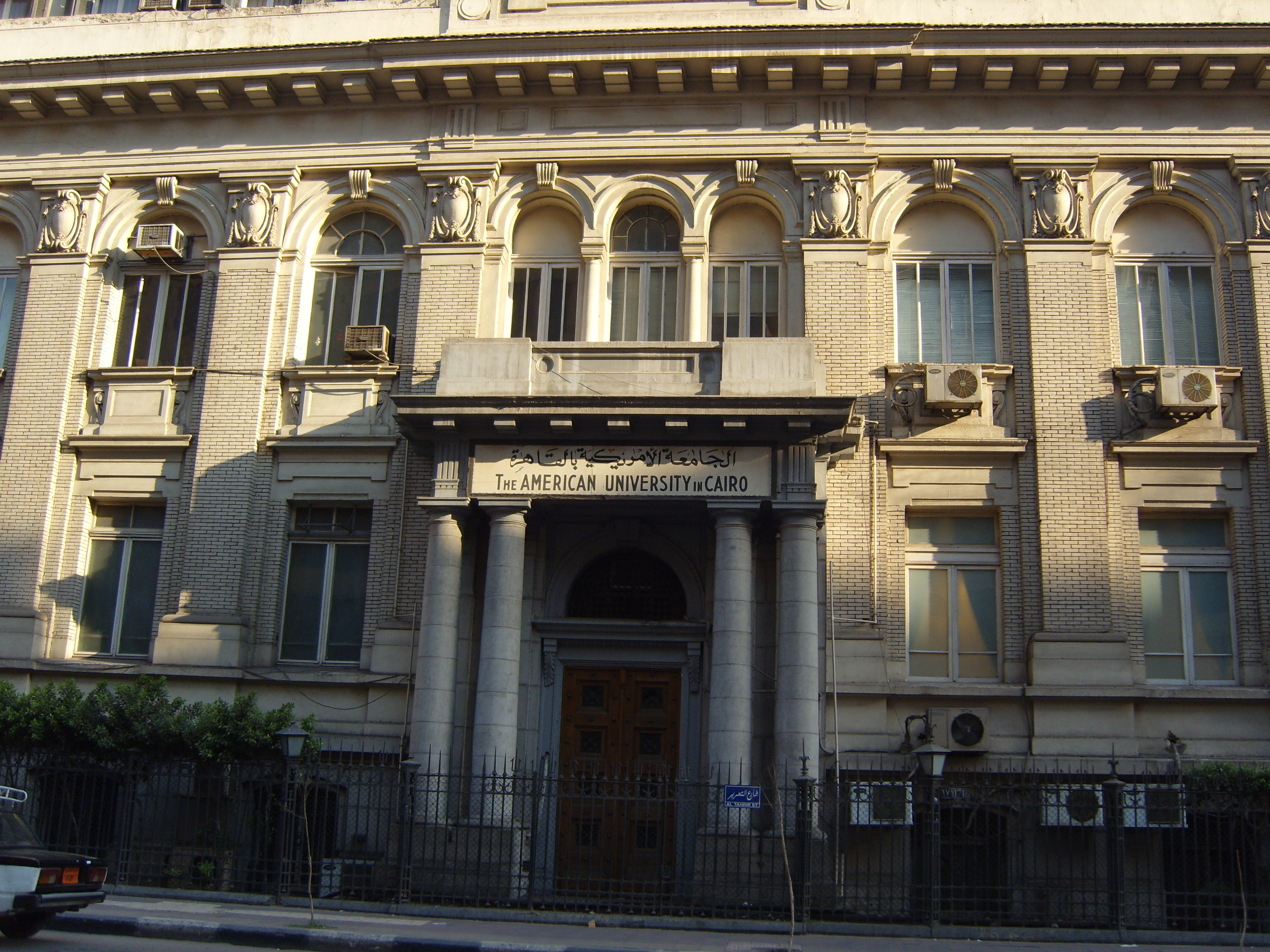
Tahrir Square (Downtown Campus)

Over time AUC added more buildings to what has become known as The GrEEK Campus, for a total of five buildings and 250,000 square feet in downtown Cairo. Sadat Metro was developed with access to the campus, and its main lines intersect near there. Also nearby is the Ramses Railway Station. The campus wall on Mohamed Mahmoud Street still has revolutionary graffiti put up. The American University in Cairo made an initiative and tried to preserve the wall graffiti. Many admirers published and even documented these graffiti by collecting images/photos of the mural taken by visitors, who were present during this historic period.

=== New Cairo campus ===
In the fall of 2008, AUC left the Greek Campus and officially inaugurated AUC New Cairo, a new 260-acre suburban campus in New Cairo, a satellite city about 20 miles (and 45 minutes) from the downtown campus. New Cairo is a governmental development comprising 46,000 acres of land with a projected population of 2.5 million people. AUC New Cairo provides advanced facilities for research and learning, as well as all the modern resources needed to support campus life. In its master plan for the new campus, the university mandated that the campus express the university's values as a liberal arts institution, in what is essentially a non-Western context with deep traditional roots and high aspirations. The new campus is intended to serve as a case study for how architectural harmony and diversity can coexist creatively and how tradition and modernity can appeal to the senses. Campus spaces serve as virtual laboratories for the study of desert development, biological sciences, and the symbiotic relationship between environment and community. The two campuses together host 36 undergraduate programs and 46 graduate programs. The New Cairo campus offers six schools and ten research centers.

The Research Centers Building houses the AUC Forum, the Prince Alwaleed Bin Talal Bin Abdulaziz Alsaud Center for American Studies, the John D. Gerhart Center for Philanthropy and Civic Engagement, and the Yousef Jameel Science and Technology Research Center.

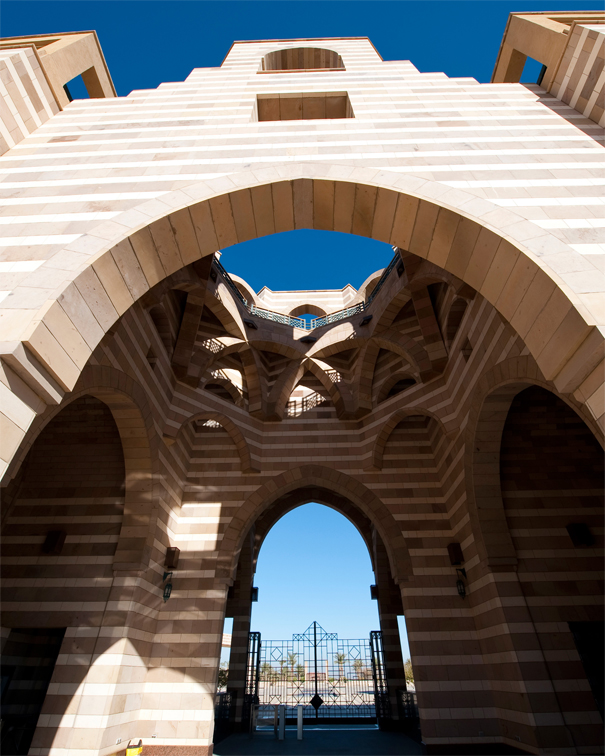
AUC New Cairo

The Dr. Hamza AlKholi Information Center houses AUC's offices for enrollment, admissions, student financial affairs and student services. The Howard Theatre is located at The Hatem and Janet Mostafa Core Academic Center, along with the Mansour Group Lecture Hall, the Academic Advising Center and the Office of the Dean of Undergraduate Studies.

The AUC Center for the Arts includes two theaters: the Malak Gabr Arts and the Gerhart, as well as the Sharjah Art Gallery and offices for the Department of Performing and Visual Arts.

The university's Campus Center provides students with a communal area to eat, congregate, organize trips, and attend campus-wide events. Inside the building are a bookstore, gift shop, bank, travel office and the main dining room. There is also a daycare center, a faculty lounge and the Office of Student Services, the Travel Office and the AUC Press campus shop.

Near the Campus Center is the student-housing complex. Across from the student residences is the three-story AUC Sports Center, including a 2,000-seat multipurpose court, a jogging track, six squash courts, martial arts and exercise studios, a free weight studio, and training courts. Outdoor facilities include a 2,000-seat track and field stadium, swimming pool, soccer field, jogging and cycling track, and courts for tennis, basketball, handball and volleyball.

Housing one of the largest English-language collections in the region, AUC's five-story library includes space for 600,000 volumes in the main library and 100,000 volumes in the Rare Books and Special Collections Library; locked carrels; computer workstations; video and audio production and editing labs; and comprehensive resources for digitizing, microfilming and preserving documents. In addition, on the plaza level of the library, the Learning Commons emphasizes group and collaborative learning. This unique area integrates independent study, interactive learning, multimedia and technology rooms, and copy and writing centers.

==== Construction of New Cairo campus ====
AUC New Cairo was built using 24,000 tons of reinforcing steel, as well as 115,000 square meters of stone, marble, granite cladding and flooring. More than 7,000 workers worked two shifts on the construction site.

Sandstone for the walls of campus buildings was provided by a single quarry in Kom Ombo, 50 kilometers north of Aswan. The stone arrived by truck in giant multi-ton blocks, which were cut and shaped for walls, arches and other uses at a stone-cutting plant built on the site. The walls were constructed according to energy management systems which reduce campus air conditioning and heating energy use by at least 50 percent as compared to conventional construction methods. More than 75 percent of the stone in the Alumni Wall that circles the campus was recycled from stone that would otherwise have been discarded as waste after cutting.

A 1.6-kilometer service tunnel that runs beneath the central avenue along the spine of AUC's campus is a key element to making its overall pedestrian nature possible. Services accessible via the tunnel include all deliveries and pickups from campus buildings, fiber optic and technology-related wiring, major electrical conduits and plumbing for hot water, domestic water and chilled water for air conditioning. All other pipes for sewage, natural gas, irrigation and fire fighting are buried on the campus, outside the tunnel, around buildings as needed for their purposes.

==== Inauguration and awards ====
Margaret Scobey, former U.S. Ambassador to Egypt, was among the guests at the inauguration in February 2009. In her remarks, Scobey said,

The new demands of our new world raise the importance of education. We need our future leaders to be diverse and to have a diverse educational experience…Perhaps most importantly, we need leaders who are dedicated to developing a true respect for each other if we are going to effectively work together to harness these forces of change for the greater good.

Ambassador Scobey also delivered a message of congratulations to AUC from then-U.S. President Barack Obama.

In 2013 AUC signed a 10-year lease agreement with Tahrir Alley Technology Park (TATP), a Cairo-based company that intends to keep the Greek Campus name, to operate the Greek Campus. AUC will retain full ownership. It turned over five buildings to TATP. This campus is to be developed as a technology park, encouraging start-ups and development of small businesses. TATP has said it will provide space on campus for approved artists.

The Urban Land Institute based in the United States recognized AUC's new campus design and construction with a special award recognizing its energy efficiency, its architecture, its capacity for community development.

== Governance and administration ==
The American University in Cairo is an independent educational institution governed by a board of trustees. In addition, a panel of trustees emeriti functions as an advisory board. The Board has its own by-laws and elects a chairperson for an annual term. There are no students on the Board.

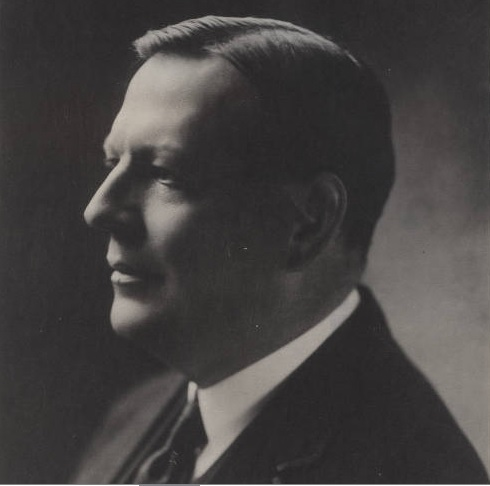
Charles A. Watson

Francis Ricciardone was the president of AUC from 2016 until 2021. In February 2019, both the faculty and the student senate of the American University overwhelmingly voted that they had "no confidence" in Ricciardone's leadership. In a letter to the president, the faculty cited "low morale, complaints about his management style, grievances over contracts and accusations of illegal discrimination" with tensions further increasing when Ricciardone invited U.S. Secretary of State Mike Pompeo to give a speech at the university.

The 13th president of AUC, Ahmad S. Dallal, graduated with a degree in mechanical engineering from AUB. He obtained advanced degrees from and taught at several renown universities in the United States prior to taking on administrative positions at American University of Beirut from 2009 to 2015 and Georgetown University in Qatar from 2017 to 2021.

=== University presidents ===
- Ahmad Dallal (2021-)
- Ehab Abdel-Rahman (July–October 2021; acting president)
- Francis J. Ricciardone (2016–2021)
- Thomas E. Thomason (2015–2016; interim president)
- Lisa Anderson (2011–2015)
- David C. Arnold (2003–2011)
- John D. Gerhart (1998–2003)
- Donald McDonald (1990–1997)
- Richard F. Pedersen (1977–1990)
- Cecil K. Byrd (1974–1977)
- Christopher Thoron (1969–1974)
- Thomas A. Bartlett (1963–1969)
- Raymond F. McLain (1954–1963)
- John S. Badeau (1944–1953)
- Charles Watson (1919–1944)

== Academics ==
AUC offers 37 bachelor's degrees, 44 master's degrees, and 2 doctoral degrees in applied sciences and engineering in addition to a wide range of graduate diplomas in five schools: business, global affairs and public policy, humanities and social sciences, and the school of sciences and engineering.

AUC holds institutional accreditation from the Commission on Higher Education of the Middle States Association of Colleges and Schools in the United States. AUC's engineering programs are accredited by ABET (formerly Accreditation Board for Engineering and Technology) and the business programs are accredited by the Association to Advance College Schools of Business (AACSB). In Egypt, AUC operates within the framework of the 1975 protocol with the Egyptian government, which is based on the 1962 Cultural Relations Agreement between the U.S. and Egyptian governments. In the United States, AUC is licensed to grant degrees and is incorporated by the State of Delaware. In addition, many of AUC's academic programs have received specialized accreditation.

Enrollment in academic programs includes over 5,474 undergraduates with an additional 979 graduate students during the 2017-2018 academic year. Simultaneously, adult education has also expanded and now serves more than 22,000 students each year in non-credit courses and contracted training programs offered through the School of Continuing Education. 94% of AUC students are Egyptian, with the remaining 6% from around the world.

=== Rankings ===
- AUC is ranked 411th university globally and 9th in the "Arab Region" by QS World University Rankings in their 2021 rankings
- Ten AUC graduate programs were ranked among the top in Africa and best 200 worldwide in Eduniversal's Best Master's Rankings for 2015 - 2016
- AUC placed 81st out of 407 institutions worldwide in the Universitas Indonesia (UI) GreenMetric World University Ranking for 2015 - 2016.

== Student life ==
=== Student activities ===
AUC has 70 student organizations. Most of the student activities at AUC are organized by students in areas of community service, student government, culture and special interests, academics, and student conferences.

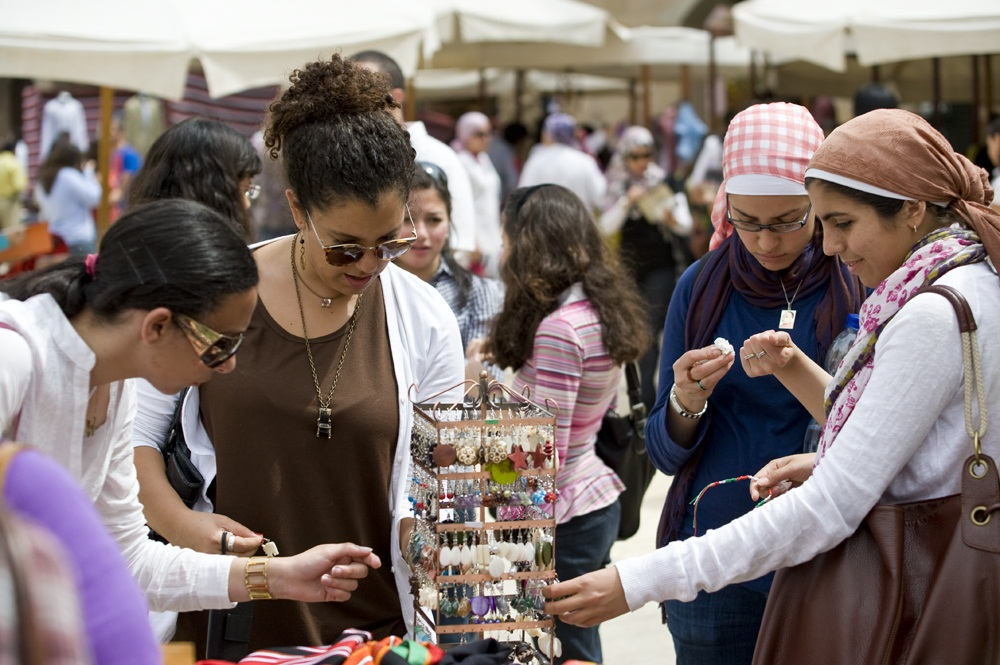
AUC New Campus

Organizations include, but are not limited to:

- Delta Phi Epsilon (professional), professional foreign service fraternity (Independent Chapter).
- Help Club
- The Student Union
- Developers Inc.
- Cairo International Model United Nations
- Astronomy Club
- AUC Times Magazine
- Khatwa
- TEDxAUC: AUC's platform for Ideas Worth Spreading
- Egyptology Association
- Philosophy Club
- Volunteers in Action
- ICGE club

=== Dormitories and student housing ===
Dormitories and student housing are located on AUC's New Cairo campus. Housing is organized by the AUC's Office of Residential Life, helping students transition to living independently and adjusting to university life as well as organizing social events. The residence is composed of 12 units, divided into five male and seven female cottages.

== Notable alumni ==
- Aida el Ayoubi, singer, songwriter and guitarist
- Amr Waked, actor
- Anne Aly, Australian political scholar, academic and counter-terrorism expert
- Anne Zaki, Egyptian theologian
- Anthony Shadid, foreign correspondent for The New York Times
- Asser Yassin, Egyptian actor
- Ben Wedeman, senior international correspondent, CNN
- Dan Stoenescu, Romanian minister, diplomat, political scientist and journalist
- David M. Malone, Canadian diplomat
- Devin J. Stewart, professor at Emory University
- Haifa Al-Mansour, Saudi Arabia's first female filmmaker
- Hassan Abdalla, Governor of the Central Bank of Egypt
- Hisham Abbas, singer
- Nadeen Ashraf, feminist activist
- Jaweed al-Ghussein, Palestinian educationist and philanthropist
- John O. Brennan, Director of the Central Intelligence Agency
- Juan Cole, American scholar, public intellectual, and historian of the modern Middle East and South Asia. Currently Richard P. Mitchell Collegiate Professor of History at the University of Michigan
- Karl Procaccini, associate justice of the Minnesota Supreme Court
- Khaled al-Qazzaz activist, educator, former civil servant in Egypt
- Khaled Bichara, CEO of Orascom Telecom and founder of LinkdotNet
- Maumoon Abdul Gayoom, president of the Maldives from 1978 to 2008
- Mohammed bin Ali bin Mohammed Al Mannai, Qatari Minister of Communications and Information Technology
- Mohamed Emam Egyptian actor and son of Adel Emam
- Maya Morsy, head of Egypt's National Council for Women
- Melanie Craft, romance novelist; wife of Oracle Corporation CEO Larry Ellison
- Mona El-Shazly, Egyptian talk show host
- Mona Eltahawy, journalist
- Muin Bseiso, poet and activist
- Nabil Fahmi, Ex Egyptian foreign minister
- Nicholas Kristof, Op-Ed Columnist, The New York Times; Best-Selling Author and Two-Time Pulitzer Prize Winner.The New York Times
- Noha Radwan, professor of Arabic literature at the University of California, Davis
- Omar Samra, first Egyptian to climb Mount Everest
- Reza Pahlavi, Crown Prince of Iran
- Rana al-Tonsi, poet
- Rana el Kaliouby, research scientist at MIT Media Lab and Founder of Affectiva
- Rania El-Mashat, Minister of International Cooperation
- Rania al Abdullah, queen of Jordan
- Shahab Ahmed, Pakistani-American scholar of Islam at Harvard University; Author of What is Islam?
- Yosri Fouda, editor and host/presenter on Akher Kalam, a talk show on ONTV
- Thomas Friedman, op-ed Columnist, The New York Times
- Yousef Gamal El-Din, anchor, Bloomberg Television
- Yuriko Koike, former Japanese Minister of Defense and first female governor of Tokyo
- Yussef El Guindi, playwright
- Mayan El Sayed, actress
- Sigrid Kaag, Dutch minister and diplomat
- Fadwa El Gallal, journalist
- Dina H. Sherif, academic

== Notable faculty ==
- Galal Amin (1935–2018), economist and commentator
- Aliaa Bassiouny, professor and chair of the finance department
- Emma Bonino (1948–2026), Italian former Commissioner of the European Community Humanitarian Office (ECHO)
- Manar El-Shorbagy, professor of political science and member of the 2012 Constituent Assembly
- Shems Friedlander, American emeritus professor and Sufi master
- Graham Harman (born 1968), American contemporary philosopher of metaphysics
- Fayza Haikal, emerita professor of Egyptology
- Salima Ikram, Egyptologist and expert on animal mummies
- Heba Kotb (born 1967), sex therapist and host of The Big Talk, a sexual advice show
- Jehane Ragai, chemist
- Kent R. Weeks (born 1941), American Egyptologist, launched the Theban Mapping Project, which discovered the identity and vast dimensions of KV5, the tomb of the sons of Ramesses II in the Valley of the Kings
- Lawrence Wright (born 1947), American Pulitzer Prize-winning journalist and author
- Mohamad Al-Ississ, former Jordanian Senator, Minister of Finance, Minister of Planning, and Special Advisor to His Majesty King Abdullah II of Jordan for Economic Affairs.
- Moustafa Youssef, computer science and engineering professor, first and only ACM Fellow in the Middle East and Africa
- Steven Salaita, American scholar and chair of the English and Comparative Literature department

== See also ==
- American University in Cairo Press
- American University of Beirut (AUB)
- American University in Dubai (AUD)
- American University of Sharjah (AUS)
- American University of Iraq, Sulaimani (AUIS)
- Cairo International Model United Nations
- Education in Egypt
- List of universities in Egypt
