= Synods and presbyteries in the UPCUSA in 1968 =

The following is a list of synods and presbyteries that composed the former United Presbyterian Church in the United States of America (UPCUSA) on December 31, 1968. The UPCUSA was the largest body, often erroneously referred to as "Northern," of Presbyterianism in the U.S., prior to its 1983 merger with the Presbyterian Church in the United States, whose churches were located entirely within the Southern and border states.

The judicatory territories enumerated here were altered at least once during the 1970s by the UPCUSA General Assembly, which, in turn, gave way to entirely new boundaries during the formative years of the current Presbyterian Church (USA) in the mid-1980s.

Synods are listed in bold, with their presbyteries underneath them, along with the number of congregations and total membership in the presbytery at that time. States included in territories are in parentheses, unless referred to in the synod or presbytery's name.

Synod/Presbytery	churches	membership
**Arizona**		
Northern Arizona	12	1520
Phoenix	57	16827
Southern Arizona	15	9441
**Catawba** (North Carolina, Virginia)		
Cape Fear (N.C.)	34	2790
Catawba (N.C.)	44	5304
Southern Virginia	23	2525
**Chesapeake** (Delaware, District of Columbia, Maryland, Virginia)		
Baltimore (Md.)	76	32537
New Castle (Del., Md.)	56	21244
Washington City (D.C., Md., Va.)	72	40729
**Colorado**		
Boulder	36	14444
Denver	51	26332
Pueblo	27	9802
Western Colorado	20	2755
**Florida**		
East Florida	24	10660
North Florida	26	5446
South Florida	32	15971
West Florida	28	12819
**Golden Gate** (northern California)		
Redwoods	51	14942
San Francisco	78	44191
San Jose	38	19319
**Idaho**		
Boise (Id., Oregon)	15	5110
Kendall	20	5354
Northern Idaho	22	3031
**Illinois**		
Alton	42	14004
Bloomington	35	14509
Chicago	141	86266
Freeport	42	15834
Mattoon	38	10261
Monmouth	58	17622
Ottawa	42	16100
Peoria	35	12629
Southern Illinois	64	10644
Springfield	41	13523
**Indiana**		
Crawfordsville	39	11409
Indianapolis	54	28687
Logansport	58	26043
New Albany	41	6595
Vincennes	42	10124
Wabash River	49	24769
Whitewater (Ind., Ohio)	26	6441
**Iowa**		
Des Moines	48	18931
North Central Iowa	63	20785
Northeast Iowa	58	19113
Northwest Iowa	60	18333
Southeast Iowa	61	18546
Southwest Iowa	59	12323
**Kansas**		
High Plains	44	10982
Neosho (Kan., Missouri)	42	8197
Solomon	49	11950
Topeka-Highland	56	27838
Wichita	47	16643
**Kentucky**		
Ebenezer	34	5484
Transylvania	26	5545
Western Kentucky (Ky., Tennessee)	31	3771
**Michigan**		
Detroit	102	81424
Grand River	41	19527
Lake Huron	57	27286
Mackinac (Mich., Wisconsin)	41	9175
Southern Michigan	51	25578
**Mid-South** (Alabama, Arkansas, Mississippi, North Carolina, Tennessee, Virginia)		
Birmingham "A" (Ala.)	23	4038
Holston (N.C., Tenn., Va.)	35	3838
Huntsville (Ala., Tenn.)	23	3158
Mississippi	30	1468
Nashville (Tenn.)	28	3093
Saint Andrew (Tenn.)	30	3290
Union (Tenn.)	43	7875
West Tennessee (Ark., Tenn.)	25	2297
**Minnesota**		
Duluth	45	11104
Mankato	51	13758
Minneapolis	36	21964
Red River	28	4544
Saint Cloud	20	5151
Saint Paul (Minn., Wis.)	24	14564
Sheldon Jackson	20	6608
**Missouri**		
Carthage-Ozark	47	9083
Iron Mountain (Ark., Mo.)	14	1146
Kansas City	36	13347
Kirk	44	5028
Saint Joseph	34	4477
Saint Louis	70	38633
Sedalia	25	4015
**Nebraska**		
Box Butte	15	4628
Nebraska City (Kan., Neb.)	36	14003
Niobrara	41	9258
Omaha	38	19085
Platte	41	12866
**New England** (Connecticut, Massachusetts, Maine, New Hampshire, Rhode Island, Vermont)		
Boston (Mass.)	25	5678
Connecticut Valley (Conn., Mass.)	21	12997
Northern New England (Me., N.H., Vt.)	32	4940
Providence (Mass., R.I.)	15	4341
**New Jersey**		
Elizabeth	54	45221
Monmouth	46	22008
Newark	56	28671
New Brunswick	42	21769
Newton	66	29792
Palisades	61	30463
West Jersey	71	29663
**New Mexico**		
Pecos Valley	12	2995
Rio Grande	29	10548
Santa Fe	20	3431
**New York**		
Albany	92	26308
Cayuga-Syracuse	53	17257
Genessee Valley	80	39905
Geneva	68	21396
Hudson River (N.Y., Pennsylvania)	111	40268
Long Island	59	31309
New York City	117	40125
Northern New York	50	9100
Puerto Rico	52	7061
Susquehanna Valley	64	18634
Utica	47	13091
Western New York	76	43028
**North Dakota**		
Bismarck-Minot (Montana, N.D.)	22	5164
Fargo-Oakes	25	4297
Pembina	35	4931
**Ohio**		
Cincinnati (Ky., Ohio)	74	36473
Cleveland	71	48492
Columbus	77	40139
Mahoning	58	29141
Maumee (Mich., Ohio)	72	25481
Miami	73	35996
Muskingum	83	17160
Scioto	56	10752
Steubenville	57	14069
Wooster	56	23869
**Oklahoma-Arkansas**		
Arkansas (Ark., Mo.)	44	5948
Cimarron (Okla.)	17	6907
Eastern Oklahoma	67	22397
Washita (Okla.)	53	14765
**Oregon**		
Eastern Oregon	16	2867
Portland	57	25472
Southwest Oregon	28	8242
Willamette	32	11117
**Pennsylvania**		
Beaver-Butler	97	33950
Carlisle	55	22613
Donegal (Md., Penn.)	69	30198
Huntingdon	60	14174
Kiskiminetas	96	24409
Lackawanna	80	19538
Lake Erie	69	25442
Lehigh	42	16101
Northumberland	48	10782
Philadelphia	182	101844
Pittsburgh	201	121229
Redstone	103	36557
Shenango (Ohio, Pa.)	74	31846
Washington	78	27510
**Rockies** (Montana, Wyoming)		
Glacier (Mont.)	22	7044
Wyoming	28	10038
Yellowstone (Mont.)	28	6774
**Sierra** (central California, Idaho, Nevada, Utah)		
Nevada	19	4351
Sacramento (Calif.)	37	18231
San Joaquin (Calif.)	39	15412
Stockton (Calif.)	21	6994
Utah (Id., Utah)	20	5930
**South Carolina-Georgia**		
Atlantic (S.C.)	28	5073
Fairfield-McClelland (S.C.)	34	1931
Georgia	23	2281
**South Dakota**		
Black Hills	25	4565
Dakota (Minn., Neb., Mont., S.D.)	23	1521
Huron-Aberdeen	34	6403
Sioux Falls	33	7005
**Southern California**		
Los Angeles-Southwest (Calif., Hawaii)	49	39268
Los Ranchos	51	41942
Riverside	28	14829
San Diego	34	24904
San Fernando	32	22848
San Gabriel	42	30823
Santa Barbara	29	14068
**Texas**		
Alamo	34	5457
Big Bend	16	3835
Brazos	56	12906
Gulf Coast (Louisiana, Tex.)	30	9273
Plains	31	8550
Trinity	85	13816
**Washington**-**Alaska**		
Alaska	16	1887
Bellingham (Wash.)	21	5252
Columbia River (Wash.)	14	4714
Olympia (Wash.)	34	11492
Seattle (Wash.)	63	28378
Spokane (Wash.)	28	12547
Walla Walla (Wash.)	21	8153
Wenatchee (Wash.)	17	4571
Yukon (Ak.)	16	3011
**West Virginia**		
Grafton	17	4500
Parkersburg	27	3752
Wheeling	27	9090
**Wisconsin**		
Chippewa (Mich., Wis.)	42	7776
Madison	44	13212
Milwaukee	57	24562
Winnebago	42	15016

== Sources ==
Minutes of the General Assembly of the United Presbyterian Church in the United States of America, Part III: The Statistical Tables and Presbytery Rolls, January 1-December 31, 1968, Office of the General Assembly, Philadelphia, 1969.
