= Manar El-Shorbagy =

Political science scholar

Manar El-Shorbagy is Professor of Political Science and former director of the American Studies Center at the American University in Cairo. In June 2012, she was announced as a member of the revamped Constituent Assembly of Egypt.

== Works ==
- Hawks have it their way, Al-Ahram Weekly, April 25-May 1, 2002,
- Al democrateyya al muqayyada [Constrained Democracy: The U.S. Presidential Elections], 2004
- Altamyeez bayna America alrassmeyya wa America al ukhra [Official America versus the 'Other America': An Elaboration on Said's Distinction], 2005
- 'Understanding Kefaya: The new politics in Egypt', Arab Studies Quarterly 29:1 (2007)
- (ed. with foreword) The student movement and national politics in Egypt by Ahmed Abdalla, 2008.
- 'Domesticating Africa: Fragments of old visions', in Luc Sindjoun (ed.) The Coming African Hour: dialectics of opportunities and constraints, 2010
