= Aliaa Bassiouny =

Egyptian academic

Aliaa Ibrahim Bassiouny is Associate Professor of Finance (with tenure) and Chair of the Department of Management at the American University in Cairo.

Dr. Bassiouny holds a BBA and an MBA both with a specialization in finance from the American University in Cairo. She received her Master in Research (MRes) and PhD (cum laude) from ESADE Business School in Spain. Her PhD thesis received distinguished recognition in the EDAMBA thesis competition. Dr. Bassiouny has an extensive research agenda on emerging markets, with her current research interests focused on the pricing dynamics of international foreign listed stocks as well as examining international portfolio management strategies of foreign investors in emerging markets using high frequency data-sets. She teaches undergraduate and graduate courses in business finance, international finance, investment analysis, portfolio management, financial modeling and financial econometrics. Bassiouny is involved in various executive financial training programs in financial analysis, financial projections, valuation and modeling aimed at business professionals, bankers and entrepreneurs. She is the finance trainer for startup companies at the AUC V-lab and the Goldman Sachs 10,000 women's program at AUC. Dr. Bassiouny is the faculty advisor to the student team representing AUC, and that won the local CFA Institute Research Challenge in Egypt for several years.
