= Charles A. Watson =

First president of the American University in Cairo

Charles Watson
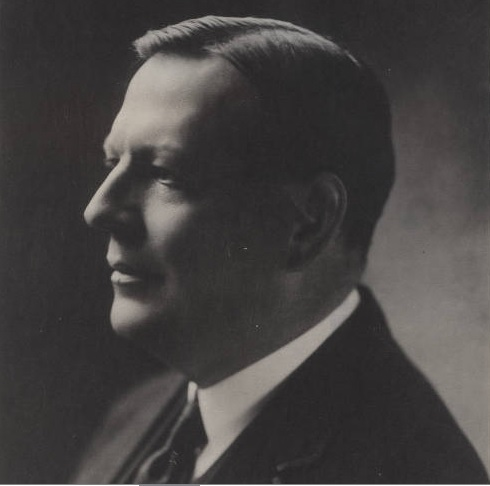

1st President of the American University in Cairo
- In office 1919–1945
- Succeeded by: John Badeau

Personal details
- Born: July 17, 1871 Egypt
- Died: January 11, 1948 Bryn Mawr, Pennsylvania
- Spouse: Maria Elizabeth Powell
- Education: Princeton University

Dr. Charles R. Watson (July 17, 1871 – January 11, 1948) was the first president of the American University in Cairo. His father was a member of the United Presbyterian Church of North America African Mission. Watson grew up in Egypt and returned to the United States in 1889 to continue his education at Lawrenceville and then Princeton. He met his wife Maria Elizabeth Powell while attending Ohio State University. In 1912, Watson went on a mission with the United Presbyterian Board of Missions, with the primary goal of identifying the possibility of establishing a Christian university in Egypt. He returned from the mission with the strong belief that there should be another Western institution for higher learning in Egypt. The institution was finally launched in 1919 after enough funding and a suitable location could be guaranteed. He remained at the AUC until John Badeau succeeded him as president in 1945, although he was still heavily active in AUC activities until he died in 1948.

== Watson's Contribution to the AUC ==
As the founding president, his service as president from 1919 to 1945 greatly shaped how the AUC evolved. For instance, the fact that the AUC was originally tied to the United Presbyterian mission caused some issues throughout the history of the AUC. For instance, during the anti-missionary campaign of the 1930s, Egyptian Muslims launched frequent protests against Protestants who they believed to be trying to convert them. Watson was able to overcome these impediments by adopting a more conciliatory and compromising tone. Additionally, Watson led the AUC in a direction that placed less emphasis on religion. According to Heather J. Sharkey this also helped to cast the AUC in a more favorable light. Watson also was an avid fundraiser and adapted his techniques to target wealthy families who may have an interest in seeing the AUC succeed. By simultaneously creating less of a Christian focus and enhancing his fund-raising techniques, Watson was able to ensure that the university remained prominent despite the tough economic times of the 1930s. An oral history with Watson in which he discusses his time at AUC is available online.
