= American Mission in Egypt =

Presbyterian operation

The American Mission in Egypt is the name often given to the operations of the United Presbyterian Church of North America that began in Cairo in 1854. Americans journeyed to Egypt with the hope of converting Coptic Christians in Egypt to Protestantism.

American missionaries first came to Egypt in 1854; British Protestant missions already existed but the Associate Reformed missionaries had 600 converts in a network of stations by 1875, and 4600 members by 1895, seeking to convert Copts, with occasional outreach to Muslims as well. Local government officials were hostile but by 1917, the "American Mission" was the largest Protestant group in Egypt, and had spent over £E800,000 on its missionary efforts. The American Mission was the largest Protestant operation in Egypt. It trained local clerics, built schools, and by 1894 reached the status of a synod with four presbyteries. By 1926 it became the "Evangelical Church in Egypt," and while still part of the UPC it was self-governing, and operated its own seminary. However, with the "Anti-Missionary Campaign" of the 1930s, the Americans were forced to rethink their strategy. There were tensions between Egyptian ministers and American missionaries, particularly over the idea of converting Muslims and the adoption of "modern" Western attitudes. The independent, postcolonial church grew out of the political and social environment of Egypt. The synod became the Coptic Evangelical Church, and was wholly controlled by Egyptians in 1957.

Separately the American Mission also created the American University in Cairo in 1919, which quickly became a center for Americanization and modernization in the Arab world. However, due to Religious Controversies and the waning interest in evangelicalism by the university's founder Charles A. Watson, the relationship slowly deteriorated and now the university is no longer connected to the UPCNA.
