= List of moderators of the General Assembly of the United Presbyterian Church in the United States of America =

The office of the Moderator of the General Assembly was the highest elected position in the United Presbyterian Church in the United States of America (UPCUSA). The Moderator was responsible for presiding over the meeting of the General Assembly, which was held annually between 1958 and 1983. After the meeting, which lasted for about a week, the Moderator served as an ambassador of the denomination throughout the remainder of the term. After completing the term, most former Moderators took on the role of a church statesman.

The chart below shows the Moderators, and the place of meetings, from 1958 when the UPCUSA was formed by the union of the Presbyterian Church in the United States of America with the United Presbyterians of North America, until 1983 when the UPCUSA merged with the Presbyterian Church in the United States to form the present day Presbyterian Church (USA).

== Moderators of UPCUSA General Assemblies ==
Number and year	Place of meeting	Moderator
170th GA, 1958	Pittsburgh, Pennsylvania	The Rev. Theophilus M. Taylor
171st GA, 1959	Indianapolis, Indiana	The Rev. Arthur L. Miller
172nd GA, 1960	Cleveland, Ohio	The Rev. Herman Lee Turner
173rd GA, 1961	Buffalo, New York	Elder Paul D. McKelvey
174th GA, 1962	Denver, Colorado	The Rev. Marshal L. Scott
175th GA, 1963	Des Moines, Iowa	The Rev. Silas G. Kessler
176th GA, 1964	Oklahoma City, Oklahoma	The Rev. Edler Garnet Hawkins
177th GA, 1965	Columbus, Ohio	Elder William P. Thompson
178th GA, 1966	Boston, Massachusetts	The Rev. Ganse Little
179th GA, 1967	Portland, Oregon	The Rev. Eugene Smathers
180th GA, 1968	Minneapolis, Minnesota	The Rev. John Coventry Smith
181st GA, 1969	San Antonio, Texas	The Rev. George E. Sweazey
182nd GA, 1970	Chicago, Illinois	The Rev. William R. Laws, Jr.
183rd GA, 1971	Rochester, New York	Elder Lois H. Stair
184th GA, 1972	Denver, Colorado	Elder C. Willard Heckel
185th GA, 1973	Omaha, Nebraska	The Rev. Clinton M. Marsh
186th GA, 1974	Louisville, Kentucky	The Rev. Robert C. Lamar
187th GA, 1975	Cincinnati, Ohio	The Rev. William F. Keesecker
188th GA, 1976	Baltimore, Maryland	Elder Thelma C. D. Adair
189th GA, 1977	Philadelphia, Pennsylvania	The Rev. John T. Conner
190th GA, 1978	San Diego, California	The Rev. William P. Lytle
191st GA, 1979	Kansas City, Missouri	The Rev. Howard L. Rice, Jr.
192nd GA, 1980	Detroit, Michigan	The Rev. Charles A. Hammond
193rd GA, 1981	Houston, Texas	The Rev. Robert M. Davidson
194th GA, 1982	Hartford, Connecticut	The Rev. James H. Costen
195th GA, 1983	Atlanta, Georgia	The Rev. James H. Costen

== See also ==
- List of moderators of the General Assembly of the Presbyterian Church (USA)
