= John S. Badeau =

American diplomat

United States Ambassador to Egypt
- In office July 19, 1961 – June 9, 1964
- President: John F. Kennedy; Lyndon B. Johnson
- Preceded by: G. Frederick Reinhardt
- Succeeded by: Lucius D. Battle

President of the American University in Cairo
- In office 1944–1953
- Preceded by: Charles A. Watson
- Succeeded by: Raymond F. McLain

Personal details
- Born: John Stothoff Badeau; February 24, 1903 Pittsburgh, Pennsylvania, U.S.
- Died: August 25, 1995 (aged 92) Jamesburg, New Jersey, U.S.
- Spouse: Margaret Hathaway

John Stothoff Badeau (February 24, 1903 – August 25, 1995) was a diplomat, engineer, minister, and scholar who served as the U.S. Ambassador to Egypt and as the second President of The American University in Cairo.

== Early life and education ==
Badeau was born in Pittsburgh in 1903. He received a bachelor of science degree in civil engineering from Union College in 1924, a bachelor of divinity degree from the New Brunswick Theological Seminary at Rutgers University in 1928, and a master's in sacred theology from Union Theological Seminary in 1936. He pursued graduate studies in Arabic and Muslim philosophy at the latter institution.

As an ordained minister and missionary of the Dutch Reformed Church, Badeau moved to Iraq in 1928. He was a civil and sanitary engineering missionary in Iraq, Mosul, and Baghdad from 1928 through 1935. Badeau spoke fluent Arabic and later became a Presbyterian.

== Academic career ==
From 1936 until 1945, Badeau was dean of the faculty of arts and sciences at the recently established American University in Cairo. During World War II, Badeau went on a brief leave of absence from the university to serve as the Chief Middle East Specialist with the United States Office of War Information.

In 1945, he was named the second president of the institution and served in that role until 1953. While president of the university, Badeau continued to teach religion, ethics and philosophy classes. Badeau developed the university's first strategic plan and established the university's social research center with a grant from the Ford Foundation. Badeau was a recipient of the Order of the Nile from President Mohamed Naguib.

In May 1964, Badeau was named as director of Columbia University's Near and Middle East Institute and began work as adjunct professor of international relations. Upon his retirement in 1971, he became professor emeritus of modern Middle East studies. He continued to be a professional lecturer at Georgetown University until 1974, and was a founding fellow of the Middle East Studies Association of North America.

== Diplomatic career ==
In 1953, Badeau was named president of the Near East Foundation. In 1961, he was named by President of the United States John F. Kennedy as his choice for Ambassador to the United Arab Republic. While Syria had seceded from the UAR in the same year, Egypt would still be referred to as the UAR until 1971.

After the Assassination of John F. Kennedy in 1963, Badeau informed President Lyndon B. Johnson that he wished to return to academic life. He left his post as Ambassador in 1964.

== Works ==
Badeau's various published works included "East and West of Suez" (1941) and "The Emergence of Modern Egypt" (1953), both for the Foreign Policy Association; and "The Lands Between" (Friendship Press, 1958) and "The American Approach to the Arab World" (Harper and Row, 1967), for the Council on Foreign Relations. Badeau contributed to numerous other publications and was the author of articles that appeared in Foreign Affairs and The Atlantic. He also wrote about the background of Soviet Middle Eastern foreign policy during the Cold War for the Academy of Political Science.

== Later life and death ==
Badeau lived in retirement in Jamesburg, New Jersey, where he died on August 25, 1995, aged 92.

== See also ==
- Foreign policy of the John F. Kennedy administration
