= Anne Zaki =

Egyptian professor

- Occupation: Theological professor
- Employer: Evangelical Theological Seminary (Cairo)
- Organization: Calvin Institute for Christian Worship
- Awards: Young Alumni Award from Calvin University

Anne Zaki is an Egyptian professor at the Evangelical Presbyterian Seminary in Cairo and an activist for social justice. Promoting social change through a Christian perspective, she is on track to become the first female ordained minister in North Africa. She was honored with the Young Alumni award from Calvin University.

== Early life and education ==
Zaki grew up in Cairo, Egypt. Her father was a pastor in the city. When she was 16, she moved to Western Canada for an international school.

She received her bachelor's degree in psychology and sociology in the United States before returning to Cairo to attend the American University. She earned a master's in social psychology from The American University in Cairo and a Master's of Divinity from Calvin Theological Seminary. Zaki also earned her PhD in Preaching from Fuller Theological Seminary.

In 2011, she and her family returned to Cairo during the Egyptian Revolution.

== Publications ==
- 2023. "Now to God Who Is Able: Vocation, Justice, and Ministry: Essays in Honor of Mark Labberton" by Neal Presa, edited by Anne Zaki
- 2022. "Public Theology and the Middle Eastern Church" in Surviving Jewel: The Enduring Story of Christianity in the Middle East, edited by Mitri Raheb and Mark A. Lamport. ISBN 9781725263192
- 2013. "Shall We Dance? Reflections on the Nairobi Statement on Worship and Culture" in Worship and Mission for the Global Church: An Ethnodoxology Handbook, edited by James R. Krabill, Frank Fortunato, Robin P. Harris, and Brian Schrag. Pasedena, CA: William Carey Library. ISBN 9780878084937
- 2007. "When Our World Looks Different: Learning from Christians Around the Globe." Reformed Worship, 83.
