= Mohammed bin Ali bin Mohammed al-Mannai =

Qatari politician

Minister of Information and Communications Technology
- Incumbent
- Assumed office 19 October 2021
- Monarch: Tamim bin Hamad Al Thani
- Prime Minister: Khalid bin Khalifa bin Abdul Aziz Al Thani
- Preceded by: Jassim Saif al-Sulaiti

Personal details
- Education: American University in Cairo (BSc)

Mohammed bin Ali bin Mohammed al-Mannai is the Qatari Minister of Communications and Information Technology. He was appointed as minister on 19 October 2021.

== Education ==
Al-Mannai holds a Bachelor in Physics from the American University in Cairo.

== Career ==
Al-Mannai was senior director for Ooredoo, formerly Qtel. He then was chief executive officer of the Qatar National Broadband Network. In 2015, al-Mannai was appointed president of the Communications Regulatory Authority. He is a member of the board of trustees at Qatar University, and the board of directors of Qatar Foundation and Al Jazeera Media Network.

Since October 2021, al-Mannai has been Minister of Communications and Information Technology.
