= Ministry of Communications and Information Technology (Qatar) =

Government ministry of Qatar

The Ministry of Communications and Information Technology (MCIT) is a Qatari ministry tasked with developing the country's communication and information technology sector. Its establishment was announced by a new cabinet in June 2013, as an extension of the Supreme Council of Information and Communication Technology that was established under Emiri Decree Law no. 36 of 2004. Its current minister is Mohammed bin Ali bin Mohammed Al Mannai.

The organization's functions are described in the Amiri Decree No. 57 of 2021 and include "supervising and developing the communication and information technology (ICT) sector", "[r]aising community awareness about the importance of communications and information technology", and "[i]mplementing e-government programs," including the development of Qatar's e-government portal, "Hukoomi." One of the MCIT's initiatives is the "Digital Society" program, which promotes digital literacy and inclusion as well as technology skills.

== Services and Digital Platforms ==
The Ministry of Communications and Information Technology (MCIT) in Qatar oversees a range of national platforms and services aimed at enhancing digital transformation and government efficiency.

=== Government Services ===
- TASDEEQ Platform: Tasdeeq is a digital authentication gateway that streamlines the verification of official documents submitted to public and private sector entities. It aims to reduce physical visits and prevent forgery through automation and document archiving.
- SMS Gateway: The Short Message Service Gateway enables government entities to communicate with citizens via SMS, improving outreach and real-time alerts.
- Qatar Cloud: Qatar Cloud is a national cloud computing infrastructure managed by MCIT, supporting scalable and secure digital services for government bodies.
- Government Data Center: The Government Data Center offers hosting and data management services for public sector organizations, ensuring business continuity and data security.
- National Authentication System (NAS): Tawtheeq is a centralized authentication system allowing citizens and residents to securely access e-government services using a single digital identity.
- Government Network (GOVNET): GOVNET is a secure and private telecommunications infrastructure connecting all government entities to facilitate inter-agency collaboration.
- Government Contact Center: The Government Contact Center serves as a unified communication hub for inquiries and service support related to various public services in Qatar.
- Framework Agreements: MCIT provides access to Government Framework Agreements, which standardize procurement across ministries and help reduce costs through consolidated contracts.
- Government Correspondence System (Morasalat): Morasalat is a digital correspondence system enabling secure and efficient communication between government institutions.
