= Cairo International Model United Nations =

Collegiate level model United Nations organisation

Cairo International Model United Nations (CIMUN) is a collegiate level model United Nations organisation that is based in Cairo, Egypt. The CIMUN program is the oldest student activity on the American University in Cairo (AUC) campus and is currently recognised as one of the largest inter-collegiate model United Nations programs outside of North America. It is well known for its annual conference in March.

== History ==
It was founded in 1989 by a group of AUC students under the guidance of the Provost of AUC, Professor Earl Tim Sullivan, during his time as a professor in the department of political science.

A fund was made in 2005 in honour of Nadia Younes, under which a conference and meeting room for the support of the model United Nations was created.

Since 2007, several elite high school students have been chosen by merit to join the conference. This has led to the expansion of the model from modelling only one UN council to seven: the Security Council, HRC, ICJ, ECOSOC, International Criminal Court, CTC, and UN Women.

In 2010, CIMUN won the Outstanding Delegation Award while at the National Model United Nations Conference in New York. While this is the second time the group has won the award, this time is considered more important because the group was representing their own country, Egypt. CIMUN won the outstanding delegation award in all the following years. That means they won the award for twelve consecutive years along with multiple honorable mentions.

== High Board members ==
Each year a different High Board is chosen to lead the organization's team. Every High Board consists of three positions: Secretary General, Graduate Advisor and Organizing Committee Head. The following is a list of the High Boards since 2002:

- 2002–2003: Mohamed Gabr, Mohamed Hilal, Dina Harb/Mohamed El Zanaty
- 2003–2004: Mohamed Menza, Mohamed Gabr, Mohamed El Zanaty
- 2004–2005: Hedayat Heikal, Sara Rizk, Moataz Samir
- 2005–2006: Mena Rizk, Tarek Mahfouz, Nora Badra
- 2006–2007: Nouran Kashef, Yasmine El Rifaie, Noha Khalid
- 2007–2008: Omar El Orabi, Dalia Ashour, Nadia Mohasseb
- 2008–2009: Kismet El Husseiny, Pensee Afifi, Sara Negm
- 2009–2010: Hussein Salama, Omar El Nayal, Amin Badra
- 2012–2013: Mokhtar Ibrahim, Shatha El Nakib, Hussien Heiba
- 2013–2014: Yara Sakr, Munir Beletemal, Ali Hossam
- 2014–2015: Radwa Hamed, Rana Shafik, Hesham Sadek
- 2015–2016: Mohamed El-Serkeek, Mariam Mohsen, Ramy Mubasher
- 2016–2017: Omar Zaky, Nour Shafik, Omar Rezk
- 2017–2018: Mohamed ElShalakany, Omar Zaky, Mazhar Ibrahim
- 2018–2019: Marwan ElSayed, Ziyad Rushdy, Mariam Hatem
- 2019–2020: Farh Elwishi, Youssef Sabek, Lamis Sallam
- 2020–2021: Abdullah Bakr, Nour Abdeldayem, Nada Khaled
- 2021–2022: Youssef Ragai, Fayrouz Ibrahim, Nada Selim
- 2022–2023: Lara Radwan, Farid H. Moursi, Ali Hussein Ali
- 2023–2024: Hanya Sedky, Logain Ragab, Youssef ElMassry
- 2024–2025: Omar Sedky, Abdelrahman Mamdouh, Ahmed El Zoghby
- 2025–2026: Zein Mousselli, Habiba Salama, Mostafa Farrag
- 2026-2027: Hana El Ashmawy, Alia Abotaleb, Adham Nassar

== March conference ==
CIMUN holds an annual conference in March. Its primary goal is to increase student interest in and awareness of the United Nations and international affairs. The conference events are wholly organised by students. Participants from international universities—including Yale, Stanford, Columbia, Concordia, and Riverside City College—have attended the conference.

=== Keynote speakers ===
The following is a list of some notable keynote speakers for past March conferences, along with the year of the speech:

- Suzanne Mubarak (1998)
- Youssef Boutros Ghali, El-Sayed Yassin, and Ibrahim Kamel (2000)
- Nabil Elaraby (2006)
- Mohammed El Farnawany (2007)
- Amr Moussa (2008)

== See also ==
- AUC Press
- American University in Cairo
- American University in Dubai (AUD)
- American University of Beirut (AUB)
- American University of Iraq - Sulaimani (AUI)
- American University of Sharjah (AUS)
- List of model United Nations conferences
- Model United Nations
- United Nations
