= Evangelical Presbyterian Church (United States) =

Protestant Reformed Evangelical church body

- Classification: Protestant
- Orientation: Evangelical Presbyterianism
- Theology: Reformed
- Polity: Presbyterian
- Associations: World Communion of Reformed Churches, World Reformed Fellowship, National Association of Evangelicals
- Headquarters: Orlando, Florida
- Origin: 1981; 45 years ago
- Separated from: United Presbyterian Church in the United States of America (UPCUSA) later the PC(USA)
- Congregations: 626 (2024)
- Members: 121,659 (2025)
- Official website: www.epc.org

The Evangelical Presbyterian Church (EPC) is an American church body holding to presbyterian governance and Reformed theology. It is a conservative evangelical Calvinist denomination. It is most distinctive for its approach to the way it balances certain liberties across congregations on "non-essential" doctrines, such as egalitarianism versus complementarianism in marriage or the ordination of women, alongside an affirmation of core "essential" doctrinal standards.

The motto of the Evangelical Presbyterian Church is "In Essentials, Unity. In Non-Essentials, Liberty. In All Things, Charity; Truth In Love." The office of the General Assembly is in Orlando, Florida.

== History ==
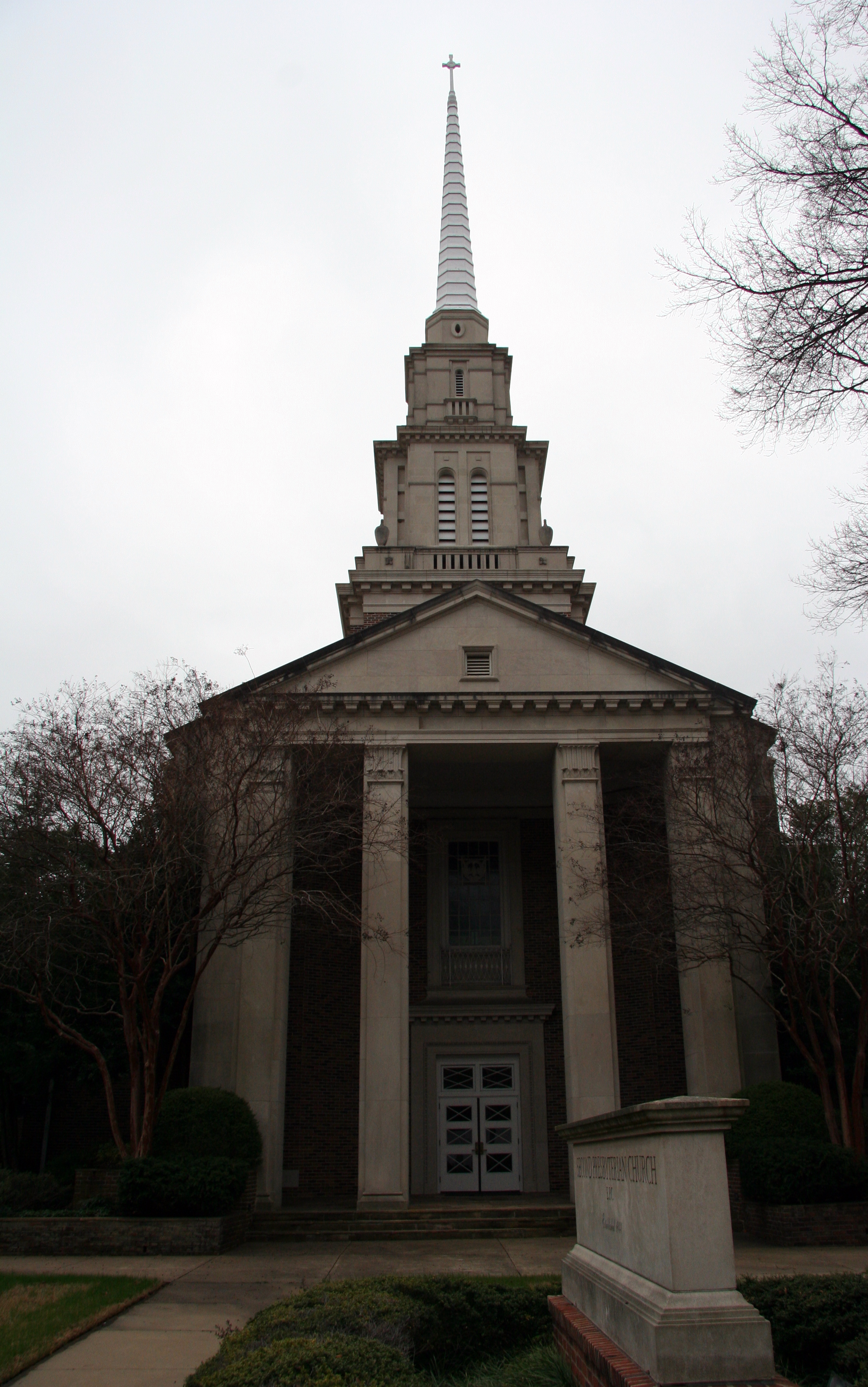
Second Presbyterian Church in Memphis, Tennessee

The EPC began as a result of prayer meetings in 1980 and 1981 by pastors and elders increasingly alienated by liberalism in the "northern" branch of Presbyterianism (the United Presbyterian Church in the United States of America, a predecessor of the Presbyterian Church (USA)). Two cases served as important catalysts in their separation: Kenyon in 1975 and Kaseman in 1981.

Wynn Kenyon was a seminary graduate who, in good conscience, declared that he would refuse to participate in the ordination of a woman. However, he affirmed that he would willingly serve in a pastorate with ordained women on the staff. Though he had been ordained by the Pittsburgh Presbytery, in 1975 the Permanent Judicial Commission of the UPCUSA General Assembly overturned Kenyon's ordination because accepting women's ordination was "an explicit constitutional provision." Mansfield Kaseman, meanwhile, was ordained as a minister by National Capital Union Presbytery in 1979 and accused of denying four traditional attributes of Jesus: his deity, sinlessness, vicarious atonement, and bodily resurrection. By 1981, his case had worked to the Permanent Judicial Commission of the UPCUSA, which affirmed his ordination. In contrast with the UPCUSA, the EPC permitted differing views on women's ordination and emphasized traditional teachings on Christology.

The first general assembly of the church met at Ward Evangelical Presbyterian Church in Livonia, Michigan, in late 1981, drafting a list of essential beliefs. This list was intentionally short to help preserve the unity of the church around the essentials of the faith in theology, church government, and evangelism.

At its foundation, the EPC adopted a list of essential beliefs—"The Essentials of Our Faith"—to state what the EPC views as the sine qua non of evangelical Christianity, in part to seek to guarantee that it would not succumb to the theological problems that had plagued its parent denominations during the fundamentalist–modernist controversy. "The Essentials" is a fuller version of the "Five Fundamentals" that many PCUSA ministers had rejected in the Auburn Affirmation of 1923:

1. The inerrancy of the original manuscripts of the Bible
2. Jesus’s virgin birth
3. Jesus's vicarious atonement
4. Jesus’s bodily resurrection
5. The reality of miracles as recorded in the Bible

Originally titled "The Fundamentals of Our Faith", the name was changed to avoid the negative connotations that the term "fundamentalism" had gained. This document has served to assure that the EPC maintains what is of primary importance for all evangelical Christians (namely the Gospel), as well as to maintain the irenic orthodoxy that has been the hallmark of the denomination.

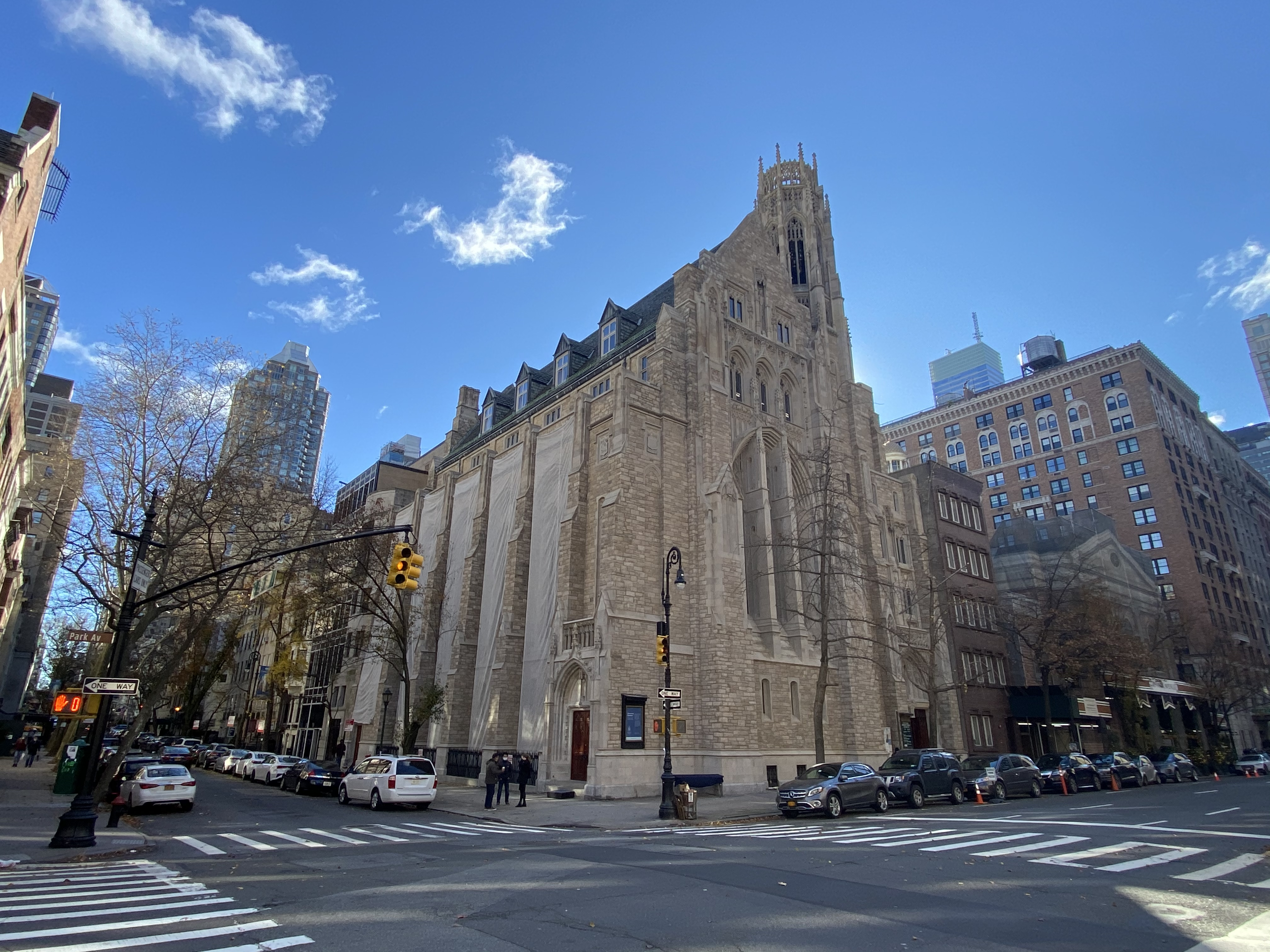
Central Presbyterian Church in New York City

Since its founding, the EPC has been active as a missional church, engaging in church planting in the United States and elsewhere, particularly in the 10/40 Window. One significant step was the incorporation of the St. Andrews Presbytery (Argentina) as one of its presbyteries. This presbytery was released to independence as St. Andrew's Presbyterian Church of Argentina after years of mutual cooperation and benefit.

At 2007 General Assembly, the EPC created a temporary, non-geographic "New Wineskins Presbytery" (NWEPC) to provide a home for churches associated with the New Wineskins Association of Churches (NWAC) that are seeking to find a new denominational home after finding that their home in the PC(USA) is no longer suitable to them theologically, organizationally, or missionally. As its mission was completed, the New Wineskins Presbytery was dissolved in 2011.

Jeff Jeremiah, the stated clerk during 2006–2021, announced at the 2012 General Assembly, held at the First Presbyterian Church of Baton Rouge, Louisiana, that the number of EPC congregations had increased from 182 in 2007 to 364 in 2012, doubling in number. The number of congregations had risen to more than 600 by August 2017.

== Statistics ==
Year	Churches	Membership
1982	35	19,000
1992	174	55,008
2002	190	69,351
2016	602	150,042
2017	-	145,503
2018	620	142,185
2019	629	136,336
2020	637	122,216
2021	630	125,418
2022	627	125,870
2023	629	121,058
2024	626	119,931
2025	-	121,659

Between 1982 and 2016, EPC grew steadily. In 2016, the denomination reached 150,042 members. However, it reported a decline in subsequent years. In 2022, it had 125,870 members in 627 churches, down 16.1% from 2016. In 2024, it had 119,931 members and 626 churches, down roughly 4.7% from 2022 and 20.1% from 2016. In 2024, the EPC reported an average worship attendance of 92,117 persons. In 2025, the EPC reported 121,659 members and an average worship attendance of 96,925.

== Essentials ==
The church has an official seven point statement of the "Essentials Of Our Faith".

These Essentials are set forth in greater detail in the Westminster Confession of Faith.

The EPC has also adopted an explanation of the relationship between the "Essentials of Our Faith" and the Westminster Standards.

== Place in American Presbyterianism ==
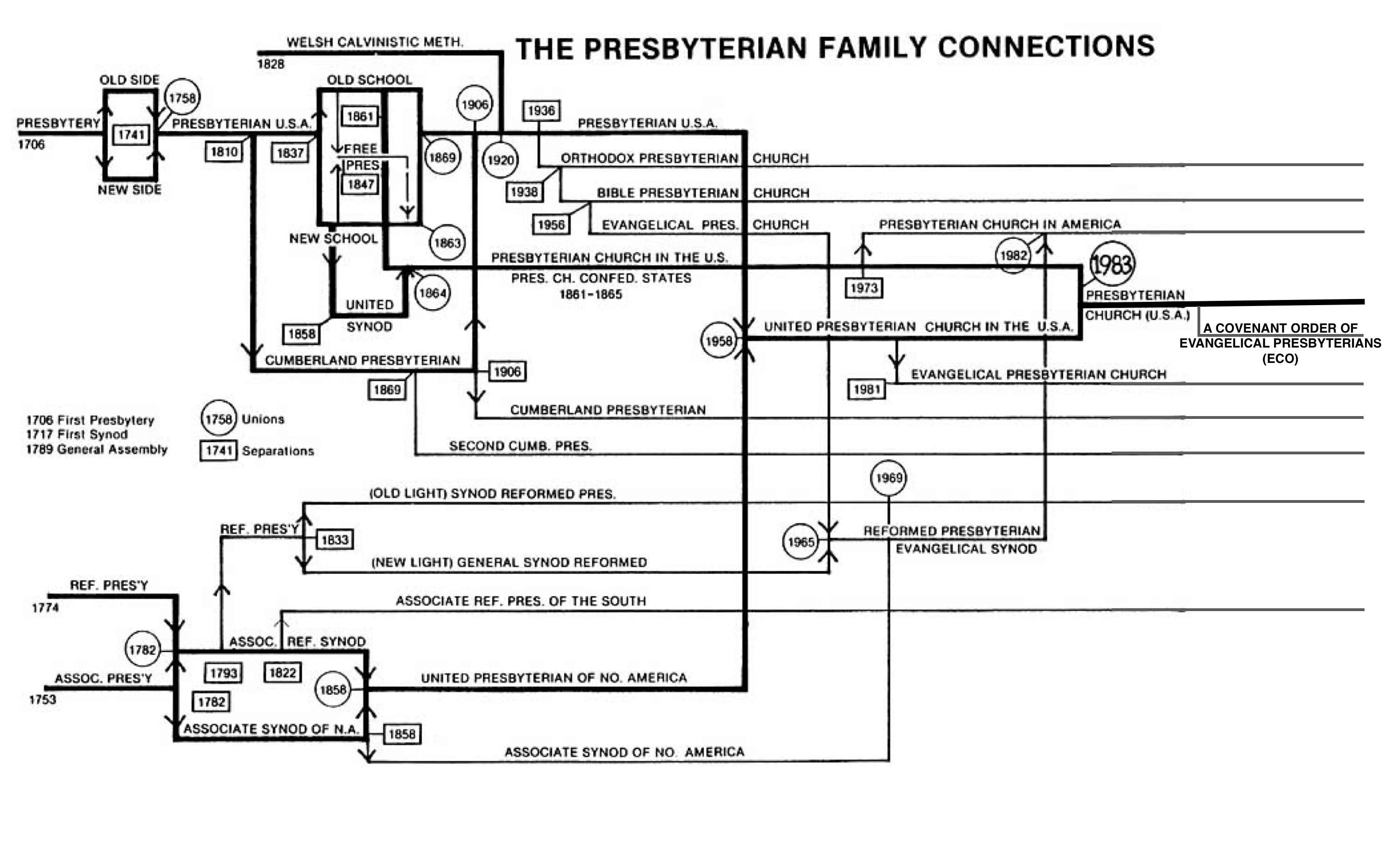
The family tree of Presbyterian denominations in the United States, courtesy of the Presbyterian Historical Society

As its name suggests, the EPC is an evangelical denomination. It associates mainly with Reformed bodies holding similar or identical beliefs regarding Christology, ecclesiology, and ethical/moral stances. As with practically all orthodox Presbyterian bodies, the EPC is committed to Biblical interpretation governed by the Westminster Confession of Faith and Catechisms. The EPC is member of the World Communion of Reformed Churches

Being within the Reformed tradition, the EPC is more conservative than the PC(USA) on matters of theology and ethics, yet is more moderate than the other major conservative Presbyterian denominations in the United States—the Presbyterian Church in America (PCA), the Associate Reformed Presbyterian Church (ARPC) and the Orthodox Presbyterian Church (OPC). The EPC's middling stance is similar to ECO: A Covenant Order of Evangelical Presbyterians, which was formed in 2012 from churches leaving the PC(USA). The EPC's ethos (summarized in its motto) allows a greater degree of freedom in areas deemed to be non-essential to Reformed theology than the PCA, ARP and OPC. The EPC, like ECO and PCUSA, but unlike PCA or OPC, belongs to the World Communion of Reformed Churches.

== Women's ordination and charismatic movement ==
Two examples of the EPC's centrist position within American Presbyterianism are women's ordination and the charismatic movement.

The EPC considers the ordination of women to be a non-essential matter that is left to the ordaining body. That is, EPC presbyteries decide whether to ordain female ministers, while individual churches decide whether to ordain female elders and deacons. In contrast, the ARP does not ordain female ministers or elders but allows individual churches to ordain female deacons, and the PCA and OPC do not ordain women.

The EPC is far more tolerant of the charismatic movement than other conservative Presbyterian bodies; some of the more prominent charismatic Presbyterian churches in America are members of the EPC.

== Ethos ==
The EPC has been described as the modern-day version of New School Presbyterianism, while the PCA, ARP and OPC are essentially the modern-day equivalent of Old School Presbyterianism. The way that this is expressed is in the motto of the denomination: "In Essentials, Unity; In Non-Essentials, Liberty; In All Things, Charity. Truth in Love." Functionally, this works out with a three-tiered approach to theological issues. These may be thought of as "A," "B," and "C" issues.

"A" issues are those which have to do with the "Essentials of Our Faith." This is a summary of those issues which are foundational to Christian faith. In the EPC, there is no allowance for disagreement among church officers (ministers, elders, and deacons) on these issues. Indeed, it is expected that all communicant members will affirm these tenets of the faith.

"B" issues are those which are essential to the Reformed understanding of the faith, such as the so-called "Five Points of Calvinism," Covenant Theology, Presbyterian government, etc. The definition of "B" issues for the EPC is found in the Westminster Confession of Faith and in the Westminster Larger Catechism and Westminster Shorter Catechism. As these issues aren't as foundational as the Essentials of Our Faith, the EPC allows ministers, elders, and deacons to state exceptions to the Westminster Standards, so long as these exceptions do not violate the system of doctrine contained therein. While non-ordained members aren't expected to adhere to the Westminster Standards, it is understood that the teaching position of the EPC is found in the Westminster Standards.

Finally, "C" issues are those on which Reformed, orthodox Christians can disagree, and which do not violate the system of doctrine of the EPC. As stated above, this would include the issues of women's ordination and the charismatic movement, as well as issues such as eschatology (views on the End times), worship preferences, or liturgy.

== Notable members ==
- Andrew Brunson - A missionary to Turkey who was imprisoned and then released after pressures by President Donald Trump
- Josh Hawley - Senior Senator from Missouri (R)
- Jim Ryun - Olympic Track and field athlete and former member of the House of Representatives from Kansas (R)

== See also ==
- ECO: A Covenant Order of Evangelical Presbyterians
- New School Presbyterians
