= New Wineskins Association of Churches =

The New Wineskins Association of Churches (NWAC) was a group of nearly 200 theologically conservative Presbyterian churches, each of which is in varying stages of departing from the mainline Presbyterian Church (U.S.A.), also known as PCUSA. The New Wineskins network of churches was formed as a result of growing discontent among theologically conservative pastors, elders, and members regarding the general direction of the PCUSA. The NWAC was scheduled to come to a conclusion in June 2012. The New Wineskins Presbytery was dissolved in 2011, as its mission was completed.

Some churches have fully departed from the PCUSA, others are in process of leaving, and still others intend to stay within the PCUSA. As of now, nearly 40 individual churches have formed the New Wineskins Presbytery, a non-geographic presbytery opened up by the more conservative Evangelical Presbyterian Church (EPC).

The co-moderators of the New Wineskins Association as of 2012 were Dean Weaver and Rev. Gerrit Dawson. The NWAC maintains headquarters in Allison Park, Pennsylvania, a suburb of Pittsburgh.

== Background ==
Reasons for the discontent leading to this possible separation include, but are not limited to:

1. General discontent with the PCUSA's decisions on issues such as homosexuality and abortion.
2. Growing dissatisfaction with the PCUSA's interpretation and enforcement of its constitution.
3. The recent reception of documents such as the PUP (Peace, Unity, and Purity) Report at the 2006 General Assembly which asserted that it is up to the ordaining body to determine whether a candidate meets current ordination standards, even though they cannot set aside any constitutional standards.

Some in the New Wineskins movement believe that this created a constitutional loophole for persons engaged in sexual activity outside of marriage to become ordained by a sort of "local option" which allows them to declare a scruple against the stated constitution.

Another recent document that was received by the PCUSA's General Assembly was a report entitled "The Trinity: God's Love Overflowing". This document, which is more familiarly known as the "Trinity Report," suggested that the terms "Father, Son, and Holy Spirit" may be supplemented (although not replaced) by other language, including such formulations as "Speaker, Word and Breath" and "Fire that Consumes, Sword that Divides, and Storm that Melts Mountains". The NWAC considers both of these documents to be in error in several places.

The New Wineskins movement believes that such declarations are a departure from the PCUSA's historic grounding in biblical theology and its own Reformed confessions. The New Wineskins Association of Churches has crafted a constitution that emphasizes local church ministry as opposed to denominational hierarchy, and consists of specific theological essentials of the reformed faith as well as ethical imperatives.

== History ==
The NWAC held its third convocation in February 2007, where it considered its future relationship with the PCUSA. At this meeting, the NWAC unanimously voted to petition the EPC to create a non-geographic, transitional New Wineskins presbytery (NWEPC) for those churches wishing to leave the PCUSA. The EPC voted overwhelmingly to form the new presbytery at its own General Assembly in June 2007 with the expectation that the New Wineskins congregations would be received into the EPC.

As of December 2007, many of the congregations that comprise the NWAC were still officially affiliated with the PCUSA, but it was expected that those congregations that would formally separate from that church and join the Evangelical Presbyterian Church (EPC), by joining the New Wineskins Presbytery (NWEPC) which met for the first time in October 2007.
