= Moderator of the General Assembly =

Chairperson of the highest court of a Presbyterian or Reformed church

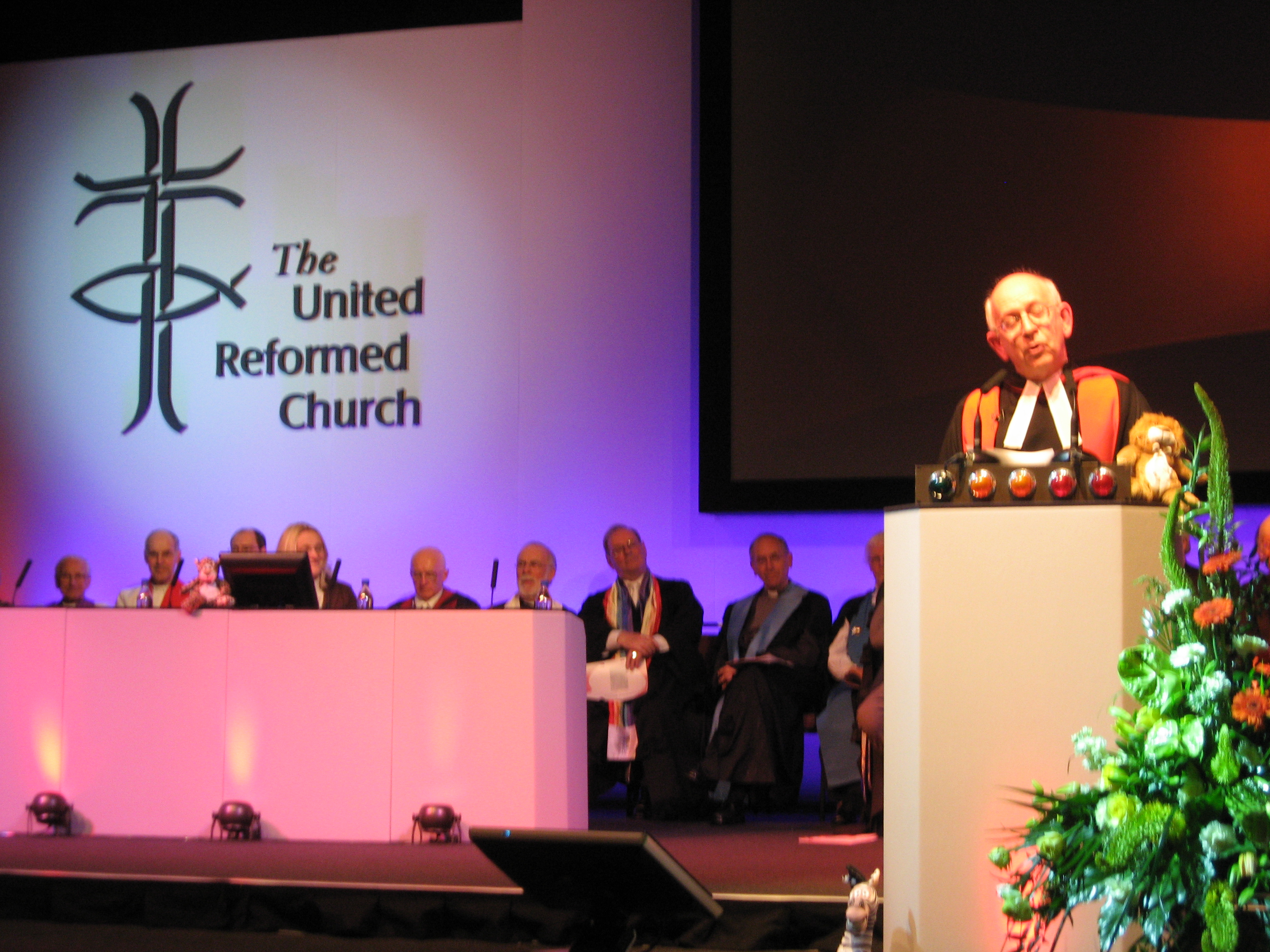
Stephen Orchard, Moderator of the General Assembly of the United Reformed Church, 2007

The moderator of the General Assembly is the chairperson of a General Assembly, the highest court of a Presbyterian or Reformed church. Kirk sessions and presbyteries may also style the chairperson as moderator. The Oxford Dictionary states that a Moderator may be a "Presbyterian minister presiding over an ecclesiastical body".

Presbyterian churches are ordered by a presbyterian polity, including a hierarchy of councils or courts of elders, from the local church (kirk) Session through presbyteries (and perhaps synods) to a General Assembly. The moderator presides over the meeting of the court, much as a convener presides over the meeting of a church committee. The moderator is thus the chairperson, and is understood to be a member of the court acting primus inter pares. The moderator calls and constitutes meetings, presides at them, and closes them in prayer. The moderator has a casting, but not a deliberative vote. During a meeting, the title moderator is used by all other members of the court as a form of address, but this may not be continued outside the meetings. Thus this convention expresses deference to the authority of the court rather than an honour for the moderator as an individual.

Many moderators act as ambassadors for their general assembly when it is not sitting, and visit many of the local churches in their denomination.

== Examples ==
A principal example of a Moderator of the General Assembly is that of the Church of Scotland, the current Moderator of the General Assembly is Rosemary Frew. According to the Church of Scotland:

"The Moderator—who moderates, or chairs, the annual General Assembly—is nominated by a committee which consists of 15 representatives elected by the General Assembly. The Moderator must also be formally elected by commissioners at the start of the Assembly. The honorary office is held for one year only. Following the week of the General Assembly, the Moderator acts as an ambassador for the Church of Scotland, frequently being invited to represent the Church at official events at home and abroad."

Additionally, within the Church of Scotland, there are individual positions for Moderator at Kirk and Presbytery level (see Moderators and clerks in the Church of Scotland).

In another example, in the Presbyterian Church in Ireland, the Moderator of the Presbyterian Church in Ireland is nominated and elected by the Church's 19 regional presbyteries. The official role involves acting as the Moderator or Chairman of the General Assembly, overseeing the debates and allowing resolutions to be put to the church house for voting. The Moderator serves as the primary public representative for both the General Assembly and the entire church.

Other national examples, with equivalent elected chairs in united churches with Presbyterian roots, include the Moderator of the United Church of Canada and the President of Assembly of the Uniting Church in Australia.

== United churches ==
In each of the united Churches of South India, of North India, of Pakistan and of Bangladesh (which all have Presbyterian roots), one of the diocesan bishops is elected Moderator of the Synod (i.e. the national governing body) for a fixed term; another is elected Vice-Moderator. The Moderator (for their term) is ranked with Moderator of the General Assembly in the Presbyterian Churches and with the national primates of Anglican churches. It is styled The Most Reverend.

== See also ==
Lists of moderators of the General Assembly:

- Church of Scotland (1562–present)
- Presbyterian Church in the United States of America (1789–1958)
- Presbyterian Church in the United States (1861–1983)
- United Presbyterian Church of North America (1858–1958)
- United Presbyterian Church in the United States of America (1958–1983)
- Presbyterian Church (USA) (1983–present)
- List of moderators of the Presbyterian Church in Ireland

== Sources ==
- McHugh, J. A. (1913). "Presbyterianism" . In Herbermann, Charles (ed.). Catholic Encyclopedia. New York: Robert Appleton Company.
