= United Presbyterian Church of North America =

Historical Presbyterian organization

- Classification: Protestant
- Orientation: Calvinist
- Polity: Presbyterian
- Origin: May 26, 1858; Pittsburgh
- Merger of: Northern branch of the Associate Reformed Presbyterian Church (Covenanter and Seceder) and the Associate Presbyterian Church (Seceders)
- Merged into: The United Presbyterian Church in the United States of America (1958)
- Congregations: 839 in 1957
- Members: 257,513 in 1957
- Ministers: 996 in 1957

The United Presbyterian Church of North America (UPCNA) was an American Presbyterian denomination that existed for one hundred years. It was formed on May 26, 1858, by the union of the Northern branch of the Associate Reformed Presbyterian Church (Covenanter and Seceder) with the Associate Presbyterian Church (Seceders) at a convention at the Old City Hall in Pittsburgh. On May 28, 1958, it merged with the Presbyterian Church in the United States of America (PCUSA) at a conference in Pittsburgh to form the United Presbyterian Church in the United States of America (UPCUSA).

It began as a mostly ethnic Scottish denomination, but after some years it grew more ethnically diverse, although universally English-speaking, and was geographically centered in Western Pennsylvania and eastern Ohio, areas of heavy Scottish and Scotch-Irish settlement on the American frontier. Within that territory, a large part of its adherents lived in rural areas, which amplified the denomination's already traditionalist worldview.

== Seceders ==
The founders of the Associate Presbyterian Church of North America, nicknamed the "Seceders", were direct immigrants from Scotland, and reflected the numerous quarrels and divisions which rent Scottish Presbyterianism. Even after the Scot Seceders had made their peace with other elements in the mother country, American Seceders retained their separate identity until 1858, when most of them united with much of the Associate Reformed Presbyterian Church to form the United Presbyterian Church of North America.

== Associate Reformed Church ==
Historian William L. Fisk traces the history of the Associate Reformed Church in the Old Northwest from its formation by a union of Associate and Reformed Presbyterians in 1782 to the merger of this body with other groups to form the United Presbyterian Church in 1858. It became the Associate Reformed Synod of the West and remain centered in the Midwest. It withdrew from the parent body in 1820 because of the drift of the Eastern churches toward assimilation into the larger Presbyterian Church. The Associate Reformed Synod of the West maintained the characteristics of an immigrant church with Scotch-Irish roots, emphasized the Westminster standards, used only the psalms in public worship, was Sabbatarian, and was strongly abolitionist and anti-Catholic. In the 1850s it exhibited many evidences of assimilation. It showed greater ecumenical interest, greater interest in evangelization of the West and of the cities, and a declining interest in maintaining the unique characteristics of its immigrant past.

== Beliefs and practices ==
Its theology was a conservative Calvinism and also held the distinctives of the Covenanters and Seceders, such as public covenanting, adherence to the Solemn League and Covenant, and exclusive use of the Psalms in singing. (These are similar to a sister body that still exists, the Reformed Presbyterian Church of North America.) The church moderated some of its stances in the twentieth century, such as when it released its Confessional Statement and Testimony (1925), abandoning compulsion of such practices as exclusive psalmody.

== Merger ==
Around this time, the UPCNA sought mergers with various other Reformed churches and agreed to merge with the much larger PCUSA in 1958, the year of its centennial, to form the UPCUSA. Most UPCNA-heritage congregations entered into the present Presbyterian Church (USA) which succeeded the UPCUSA in 1983, but some local churches of more evangelical conservative orientation departed in the 1970s to denominations such as the Presbyterian Church in America (founded 1973) and the Evangelical Presbyterian Church (1981).

== Missions ==
=== Egypt ===
American missionaries first came to Egypt in 1854; British Protestant missions already existed but the Associate Reformed missionaries had 600 converts in a network of stations by 1875, and 4600 members by 1895, seeking to convert Copts, with occasional outreach to Muslims as well. Local government officials were hostile but by 1917, the "American Mission" was the largest Protestant group in Egypt, and had spent over £E800,000 on its missionary efforts. The American Mission was the largest Protestant operation in Egypt. It trained local clerics, built schools, and by 1894 reached the status of a synod with four presbyteries. By 1926 it became the "Evangelical Church in Egypt," and while still part of the UPC it was self-governing, and operated its own seminary. However, with the "Anti-Missionary Campaign" of the 1930s, the Americans were forced to rethink their strategy. There were tensions between Egyptian ministers and American missionaries, particularly over the idea of converting Muslims and the adoption of "modern" Western attitudes. The independent, postcolonial church grew out of the political and social environment of Egypt. The synod became the Coptic Evangelical Church, and was wholly controlled by Egyptians in 1957.

Separately the American Mission also created the American University in Cairo in 1919, which quickly became a center for Americanization and modernization in the Arab world. However, due to Religious Controversies and the waning interest in evangelicalism by the university's founder Charles A. Watson, the relationship slowly deteriorated and now the university is no longer connected to the UPCNA.

=== Colonial India ===
From the beginning, the goal of the Sialkot Mission of the UPCNA, established in 1854, was the encouragement and nurturing of leadership for the Synod of the Punjab in colonial India, which was later partitioned in 1947 between independent India and the newly created state of Pakistan.

In the Punjab Province of undivided India, United Presbyterian churches were established in the cities of Rawalpindi (1856), Gujranwala (1863), Gurdaspur (1872), Jhelum (1874), Zafarwal (1880), Pathankot (1882), Pasrur (1884), Dhariwal (1890), Lyallpur (1895), Sangla Hill (1901), Sargodha (1905), Lahore (1913), and Badomali (1915), Campbellpur (1916), Martinpur (1918), Taxila (1921), Sheikhupura (1923). Christian missionaries established hospitals, schools, technical training centers, and colleges as well.

These leaders have ranged from illiterate village elders to pastors of important city congregations, as well as a bishop in the Church of Pakistan. They have included Christian craftsmen, artisans, teachers, professors, doctors and nurses. After the partition of India, mission schools were nationalized by the Muslim Pakistani government; the training future leadership faces a difficult future.

== See also ==
- List of moderators of the General Assembly of the United Presbyterian Church of North America
