= Declaratory statement =

In Presbyterianism, a declaratory statement is a statement attached to the Westminster Confession of Faith in order to modify or clarify the confessional standard of the church. A number of denominations adopted them around the turn of the 20th century, and some are still in use today.

== Adoption ==
The following churches adopted declaratory statements:

- United Presbyterian Church (Scotland) (1879)
- Free Church of Scotland (1892)
- Presbyterian Church of Australia (1901)
- Presbyterian Church in the United States of America (1903)

One significant reason given was that under a strict subscription model, "many persons had difficulty in taking office because of certain expressions of doctrine contained in the Confession of Faith." The Free Church Act noted that "it is expedient to remove difficulties and scruples which have been felt by some".

The Church of Scotland never adopted such a declaratory statement, on the basis that its ability to adjust its Confession was restricted by its inclusion in the Acts of Union 1707.

== Contents ==
The declaratory statements typically touch on issues such as the love of God for all people, the free offer of the gospel, the salvation of infants, and freedom of religion.

Some of declaratory statements include a clause granting those who subscribe to the Confession "liberty of opinion" on certain matters. The wording varies: in the UPC it was on "such points in the Standards, not entering into the substance of the faith," the Free Church had "such points in the Confession as do not enter into the substance of the Reformed Faith therein set forth," while the PCA has "matters in the subordinate standard not essential to the doctrine therein taught". The UPC included the specific example of creation in six days. The extent of the liberty in the PCA's clause has been a point of disagreement.

== Criticism ==
B. B. Warfield was an early critic of declaratory statements in general, calling them "clumsy" and preferring system subscription. He argued that the effect of a declaratory statement was "simply to amend the Confession by indirection in certain specified points (and if amendment is to be made, why not do it directly?), while leaving the liberty of the subscriber just as much in bondage to the (now altered) Confession as before; it, therefore, does not in any way supersede the necessity for a freer formula of subscription."

The 1892 Free Church Act was the reason for the formation of the Free Presbyterian Church of Scotland. The seceders felt that the language of the declaratory statement verged on Arminian. The same charge was levelled at the Northern Presbyterian Church's 1903 revision: D. G. Hart and John R. Muether suggest that evidence for this "can be found in the reunion that took place on the heels of revision, when the Arminian prodigals of the Cumberland Presbyterian Church reunited with the Northern Presbyterians in 1906." John Murray said of the 1903 Declaratory Statement:

The Declaratory Statement epitomizes the entire difference of spirit and genius between the most distinguished of Reformed creed-makers, the Westminster divines, and modern ecclesiastics. The former were insistent upon dogmatic definiteness on questions that belong to the integrity of the Reformed Faith and therefore lie close to the heart of the Christian religion. In modern times the trend is in the opposite direction. The doctrines that lie at the very heart of our Faith are by vague, cryptic, ambiguous statement thrown into indefiniteness and obscurity. The purpose of the Westminster Confession was to state truth precisely to the exclusion of error; the genius of modern creed-making appears to be the power to devise enough elasticity to include error.

== See also ==
- Basis of Union (Presbyterian Church of Australia)
- Confessionalism (religion)
