= Salvation of infants =

Christian theological conundrum

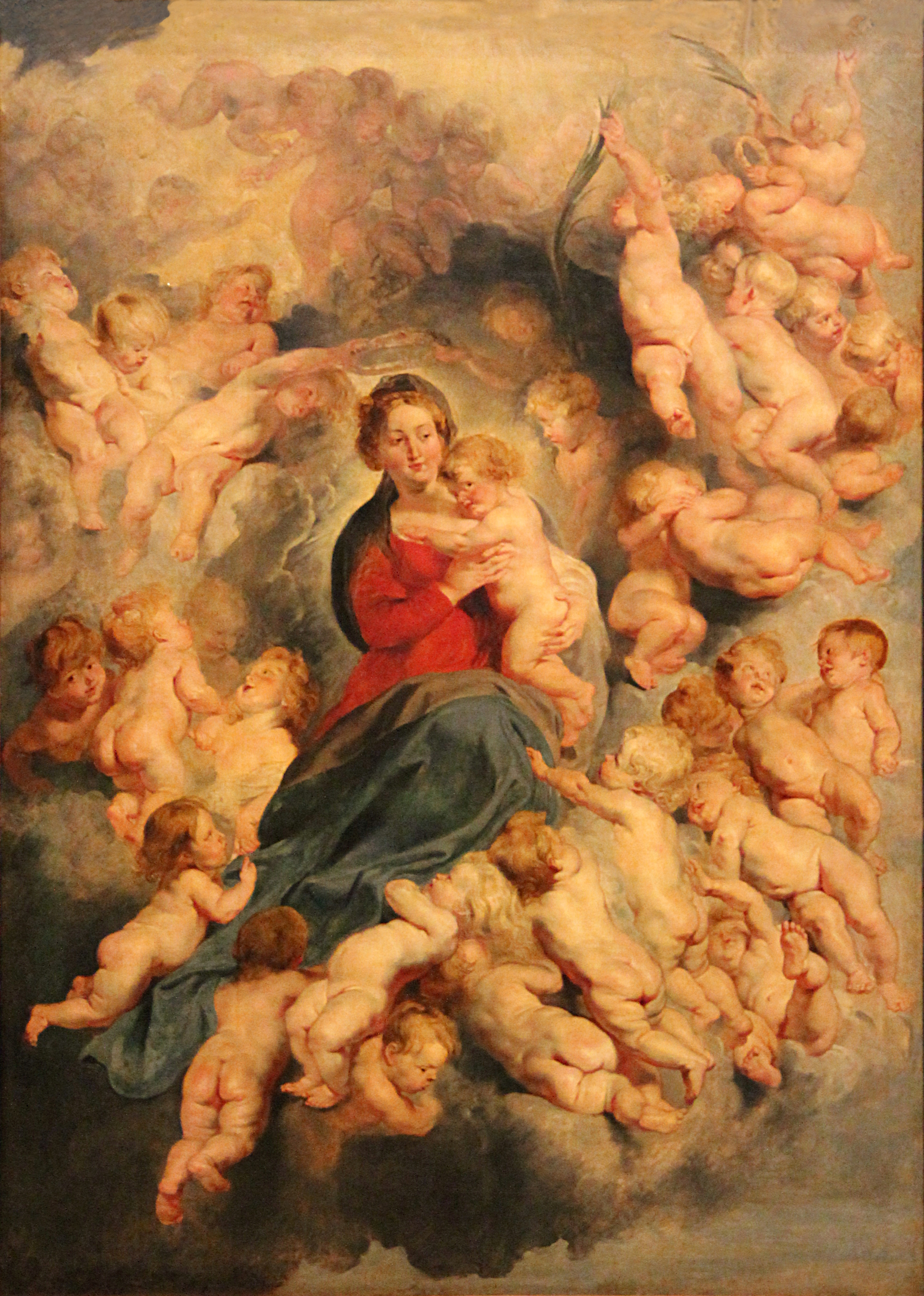
Peter Paul Rubens, The Virgin and Child Surrounded by the Holy Innocents, 1616.

In Christian theology, the salvation of infants has been a matter of speculation and diverse opinions. While some believe that all those who die in infancy are saved, others believe that people only have certainty regarding some of these infants.

== Early church ==
St. Augustine believed that children who died unbaptized were damned. In his Letter to Jerome, he wrote,

Likewise, whosoever says that those children who depart out of this life without partaking of that sacrament shall be made alive in Christ, certainly contradicts the apostolic declaration, and condemns the universal Church, in which it is the practice to lose no time and run in haste to administer baptism to infant children, because it is believed, as an indubitable truth, that otherwise they cannot be made alive in Christ. Now he that is not made alive in Christ must necessarily remain under the condemnation, of which the apostle says, that "by the offense of one judgment came upon all men to condemnation." That infants are born under the guilt of this offense is believed by the whole Church.

In his Against Julian, however, Augustine said of non-baptized infants, "I cannot define the amount and kind of their punishment".

== Denominational views ==
=== Roman Catholicism ===
The Roman Catholic view is that baptism is necessary for salvation and that it frees the recipient from original sin. Roman Catholic tradition teaches that unbaptized infants, not being freed from original sin, go to Limbo (Latin: limbus infantium), which is an afterlife condition distinct from Hell. This is not, however, official church dogma. The official position of the Catholic Church, as stated in the 1992 Catechism of the Catholic Church is:

As regards children who have died without Baptism, the Church can only entrust them to the mercy of God, as she does in her funeral rites for them. Indeed, the great mercy of God who desires that all men should be saved, and Jesus' tenderness toward children which caused him to say: "Let the children come to me, do not hinder them", allow us to hope that there is a way of salvation for children who have died without Baptism.

In 2007, the International Theological Commission published "The Hope of Salvation for Infants Who Die without Being Baptised", in which they distinguished between the "hope" mentioned in the Catechism and "sure knowledge":

Our conclusion is that the many factors that we have considered above give serious theological and liturgical grounds for hope that unbaptised infants who die will be saved and enjoy the Beatific Vision. We emphasise that these are reasons for prayerful hope, rather than grounds for sure knowledge.

=== Eastern Orthodoxy ===
Nikephoros Kallistos Xanthopoulos (1256–1335) wrote that "We should also know that when baptized infants die, they enjoy the Paradise of delight, whereas those not illumined by Baptism and those born of pagans go neither to Paradise nor to Gehenna."

The Synod of Jerusalem (1672) declared (Decree XVI):

And forasmuch as infants are men, and as such need salvation; needing salvation, they need also Baptism. And those that are not regenerated, since they have not received the remission of hereditary sin, are, of necessity, subject to eternal punishment, and consequently cannot without Baptism be saved; so that even infants ought, of necessity, to be baptised."

=== Reformed ===
Whereas the Roman Catholic and Eastern Orthodox approaches have been influenced by their views on the necessity of the means of grace, the Reformed do not believe that baptism is necessary for salvation, and thus do not view unbaptized infants the same way. According to Herman Bavinck,

The Reformed refused to establish the measure of grace needed for a human being still to be united with God, though subject to many errors and sins, or to determine the extent of the knowledge indispensably necessary to salvation. Furthermore, they maintained that the means of grace are not absolutely necessary for salvation and that also apart from the Word and sacraments God can regenerate persons for eternal life.

The 17th-century Protestant confessions asserted the salvation of the infant children of believers. The Canons of Dort (1619) devoted an article to the subject, drawing on covenant theology and 1 Corinthians 7:14:

Since we must make judgments about God’s will from his Word, which testifies that the children of believers are holy, not by nature but by virtue of the gracious covenant in which they together with their parents are included, godly parents ought not to doubt the election and salvation of their children whom God calls out of this life in infancy. (I.17)

The Westminster Confession of Faith (1646) refers to "elect infants" in X.3:

Elect infants, dying in infancy, are regenerated, and saved by Christ, through the Spirit, who worketh when, and where, and how He pleaseth: so also are all other elect persons who are uncapable of being outwardly called by the ministry of the Word.

This statement has provoked considerable discussion as to whether there are some infants dying in infancy who are not elect. The Declaratory Statement of the Presbyterian Church of Australia (1901) says "in accepting the subordinate standard it is not required to be held that any who die in infancy are lost". The Presbyterian Church in the United States of America's Declaratory Statement of 1903 went further, and said,

Second, with reference to Chapter X, Section 3, of the Confession of Faith, that it is not to be regarded as teaching that any who die in infancy are lost. We believe that all dying in infancy are included in the election of grace, and are regenerated and saved by Christ through the Spirit, who works when and where and how he pleases.

Loraine Boettner argued in 1932 that "Calvinistic theologians have held that those who die in infancy are saved", on the basis that "since these infants have never committed any actual sin themselves, their inherited sin would be pardoned and they would be saved on wholly evangelical principles." Boettner appealed to Charles Hodge, W. G. T. Shedd, and B. B. Warfield as Reformed theologians who believed in the salvation of all infants. John Murray, however, argues that "other Reformed theologians of equal distinction scrupulously refrained from taking any such position."

=== Methodism ===
Methodist doctrine teaches that the atonement of Christ "is unconditionally effective in the salvation of those mentally incompetent from birth, of those converted persons who have become mentally incompetent, and of children under the age of accountability." Wesleyan-Arminian theology teaches that those who die before reaching the age of accountability will go to heaven. Upon reaching the age of accountability, persons are thereafter responsible for making a decision to follow Jesus. As Methodism affirms infant baptism as a sign and seal of the covenant of grace, "Christian children are baptized into the covenant community and later given training through Confirmation to accept the covenant for themselves at an age of accountability."

=== Baptists ===
The Second London Confession of Faith, published in 1677 and revised in 1689 by the Particular Baptists, kept the wording of the Westminster Confession where it states:

Elect infants dying in infancy are regenerated and saved by Christ through the Spirit...

The Orthodox Creed, published in 1679, explicitly affirms in Article 44 the extraordinary salvation of infants that die in infancy:

We believe that all little children dying in their infancy, before they are capable to choose either good or evil, whether born of believing parents or unbelieving parents, shall be saved by the grace of God, the merit of Christ, their Redeemer, and the work of the Holy Ghost. And so being made members of the invisible Church, they shall enjoy life everlasting, for our Lord Jesus said "of such belongs the Kingdom of Heaven". Ergo, we conclude that is false the opinion which says that those little infants, dying before Baptism, are damned.

The Southern Baptist's Baptist Faith and Message implies the salvation of all who die in infancy when it says, "as soon as they are capable of moral action, they become transgressors and are under condemnation."

Baptist theologians such as Charles Spurgeon John Piper, and Sam Storms affirm the salvation of all who die in infancy. John MacArthur argues for the salvation of those who die before the age of accountability on the basis of 2 Samuel 12:23, where David says of his infant son, "I shall go to him, but he will not return to me". Those who reject universal infant salvation, however, point out that this and other Scriptural passages support only the view that the children of believers will be in heaven.
