= Meredith Kline =

American theologian and academic (1922 – 2007)

Meredith George Kline
- Born: December 15, 1922
- Died: April 14, 2007 (aged 84)
- Occupations: Theologian and Old Testament scholar
- Known for: Framework interpretation

Academic background
- Education: A. B., Gordon College, Th. B. and Th. M., Westminster Theological Seminary, Ph. D., Dropsie College

Academic work
- Institutions: Westminster Theological Seminary; Gordon-Conwell Theological Seminary; Claremont School of Theology; Reformed Theological Seminary; Westminster Seminary California

Meredith George Kline (December 15, 1922 – April 14, 2007) was an American theologian and Old Testament scholar. He also had degrees in Assyriology and Egyptology.

== Academic career ==
Kline received his AB from Gordon College, Th.B. and Th.M. from Westminster Theological Seminary in Pennsylvania, and PhD in Assyriology and Egyptology from Dropsie College. He enjoyed a long and fruitful professorial career spanning five decades and two coasts, teaching Old Testament at Westminster Theological Seminary (1948–77), Gordon-Conwell Theological Seminary (1965–93), the Claremont School of Theology (1974–75), Reformed Theological Seminary (1979–83), and Westminster Seminary California (1981–2002). Kline was a professor emeritus at Westminster Seminary California and Gordon-Conwell until his death. He was an ordained minister in the Orthodox Presbyterian Church.

== Work ==
Building on the legacy of Geerhardus Vos, Kline was an influential voice for covenant theology in the Reformed tradition, providing both new insights into biblical accounts and critical engagement with contemporary biblical scholarship. He is, perhaps, best known for his contributions on the subject of ancient suzerain–vassal treaties, specifically on the relationship of treaties from the 2nd millennium BC to covenants found in the Bible.

Kline is also well known for propounding the framework interpretation of the creation account found in the first chapter of Genesis in the New King James Version.

Theologian John Frame has called Kline "the most impressive biblical theologian of my lifetime," adding that Kline's work "is orthodox, yet often original, and it always provides [a] rich analysis of Scripture."

In 2000, a festschrift was published in Kline's honor: Creator Redeemer Consummator: A Festschrift for Meredith G. Kline, ed. H. Griffith and J. R. Muether (Greenville, SC: Reformed Academic Press), featuring scholars (and former students) such as Tremper Longman and Charles Lee Irons.

== Publications ==
Some of Kline's many publications include:

=== Books ===
- Kline, Meredith G. (1958). The Habiru: Kin or Foe of Israel (PhD). OCLC 39846689.
- ——— (1963). Treaty of the Great King: The Covenant Structure of Deuteronomy: Studies and Commentary (1st ed.). Grand Rapids, MI: Eerdmans. OCLC 23320371.
- ——— (1968). By Oath Consigned: A Reinterpretation of the Covenant Signs of Circumcision and Baptism. Grand Rapids, MI: Eerdmans. ISBN 978-0-802-81621-4. OCLC 10128053. Archived from the original on March 14, 2010.
- ——— (1980). Images of the Spirit. Baker Biblical Monograph. Grand Rapids, MI: Baker Book House. ISBN 978-0-801-05416-7. OCLC 6672708.
- ——— (1997). The Structure of Biblical Authority. Grand Rapids, MI: Eerdmans. ISBN 978-0-802-81475-3. OCLC 520918.
- ——— (2001). Glory in Our Midst: A Biblical-Theological Reading of Zechariah's Night Visions. Eugene, OR: Wipf & Stock. ISBN 978-1-579-10599-0. OCLC 50337531.
- ——— (2006). Kingdom Prologue: Genesis Foundations for a Covenantal Worldview (reissue ed.). Eugene, OR: Wipf & Stock. ISBN 978-1-597-52564-0. OCLC 70160948.
- ——— (2006). God, Heaven, and Har Magedon: A Covenantal Tale of Cosmos and Telos. Eugene, OR: Wipf & Stock. ISBN 978-1-597-52478-0. OCLC 70853391.
- ——— (2012). Treaty of the Great King: The Covenant Structure of Deuteronomy: Studies and Commentary (reissue ed.). Eugene, OR: Wipf & Stock. ISBN 978-1-610-97698-5. OCLC 799060467.

=== Articles and chapters ===
- ——— (1953). "The Intrusion and the Decalogue". Westminster Theological Journal. 16: 1–22.
- ——— (1958). "Because It Had Not Rained". Westminster Theological Journal. 20. ASA: 146–57.
- ——— (1969). "Canon and Covenant (part 1 – Canon and Covenant)". Westminster Theological Journal. 32 (1): 49–67.
- ——— (1969). "Canon and Covenant (part 2 – All Scripture Covenantal)". Westminster Theological Journal. 32 (2): 179–200.
- ——— (1970). "Canon and Covenant (part 3 – Canon Community)". Westminster Theological Journal. 33 (1): 45–72.
- ——— (1970). "Genesis". In Guthrie, Donald; Motyer, J. A. (eds.). The New Bible Commentary (Third ed.). Grand Rapids: Eerdmans. ISBN 0-8028-2281-9.
- ——— (September 1977). "Lex Talionis and the Human Fetus". Journal of the Evangelical Theological Society. 20 (3): 193–201. PMID 11664012.
- ——— (February 1994). "Covenant Theology Under Attack". New Horizons. Upper register.
- ——— (1996). "Space and Time in the Genesis Cosmogony". Perspectives on Science and Christian Faith. 48. ASA: 2–15.
- ———; Irons, Lee (2000). "The Framework View". In Hagopian, David G. (ed.). The Genesis Debate: Three Views on the Days of Creation. ISBN 978-0-970-22450-7.
