= Directory for Public Worship =

Liturgical manual produced in 1644

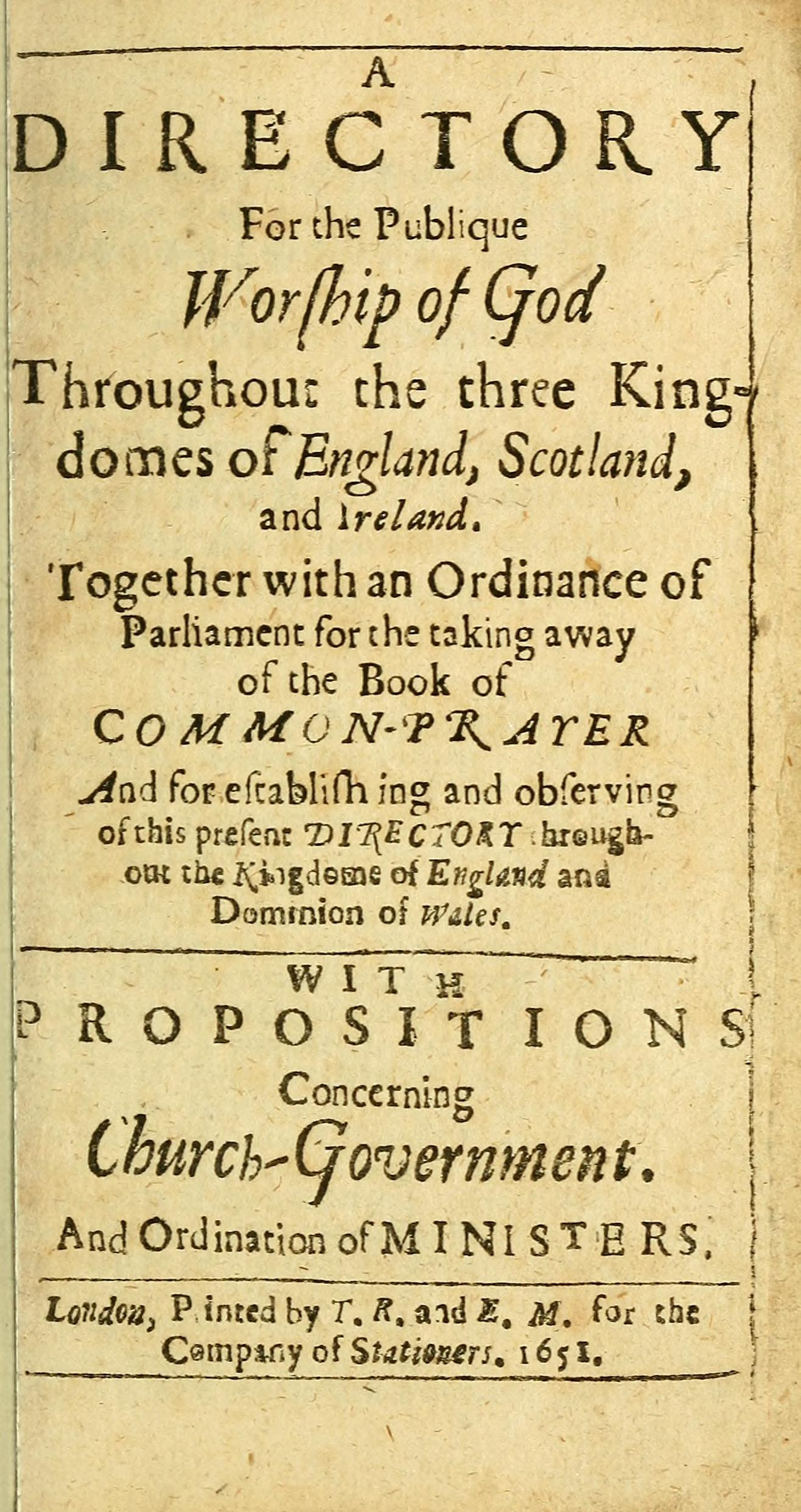
Title page of Directory for Public Worship

The Directory for Public Worship (known in Scotland as the Westminster Directory) is a liturgical manual produced by the Westminster Assembly in 1644 to replace the Book of Common Prayer. Approved by the Parliament of England (Long Parliament) in 1644 and the Parliament of Scotland in 1645, the Directory is part of the Westminster Standards, together with the Westminster Confession of Faith, the Westminster Shorter Catechism, the Westminster Larger Catechism, and the Form of Church Government.

== Origins ==
The movement against the Book of Common Prayer, partly inspired by the English Parliament, had come to a head with the submission of the Root and Branch petition of 1640, which demanded "that the said government (i.e. episcopal system) with all its dependencies, roots and branches be abolished." Among the "branches" was the Book of Common Prayer, which was said to be a "Liturgy for the most part framed out of the Romish Breviary, Rituals, [and] Mass Book."

Thus in 1641, an abridgment of John Knox's Book of Common Order was presented to the Long Parliament. In 1644, another adaptation of the same original was presented to the Westminster Assembly and printed. However, the parliamentary divines resolved to produce their own book, and set up a committee which was to agree on a set of instructions for ministers in charge of congregations—not a fixed form of devotion, but a manual of directions. While the English Book of Common Prayer had early use in Scotland, it is a fixed liturgy, providing a range of fixed prayers and detailed tables of fixed lessons. It is therefore not easy to compare it with the Directory. However, the Directory does very much follow the Book of Common Order used in Scotland from 1564, which derived from Knox’s Forme of Prayers used in the English Congregation in Geneva. This book affords discretion in the wording of the prayers and no fixed lectionary.

The Directory was produced by a parliamentary subcommittee among the Westminster divines. The chair of the subcommittee was Stephen Marshall. Other members included Thomas Young, Herbert Palmer, and Charles Herle. Representing the Independents were Philip Nye and Thomas Goodwin, and representing the Scottish Presbyterians were Alexander Henderson, Robert Baillie, George Gillespie, and Samuel Rutherford. The text appears to be in the style of Nye's writing.

== Contents ==
The Directory was something like an agenda, but it was also something of a handbook of pastoral practice containing a lengthy section on visiting the sick, and a detailed section on preaching. The book reflected the compilers' belief in the regulative principle of worship, which holds that only what is mandated by explicit Scripture, whether by explicit command, precept or example or by good and necessary consequence can be deduced from Scripture was warranted in the public worship of God.

The Directory lays down a structure of worship centered on the reading of Scripture. The canonical scriptures are to be read in order, a chapter of each testament at a time, after which there was a long prescribed prayer and then the minister was to preach to the effect that "his own and his hearers' hearts [are] to be rightly affected with their sins."

Baptism was to be administered at this same service using a baptismal font which the people could see and where they could hear, rather than hitherto where fonts had often been placed at the entrance of the church. A long instruction preceded the administration of the rite which, among other things, made the point that baptism is not so necessary that the child would be damned or the parents guilty if it were not administered, on the grounds that the children of the faithful "are Christians and federally holy before baptism." There was to be prayer that the inward baptism of the Spirit would be joined with the outward baptism of water.

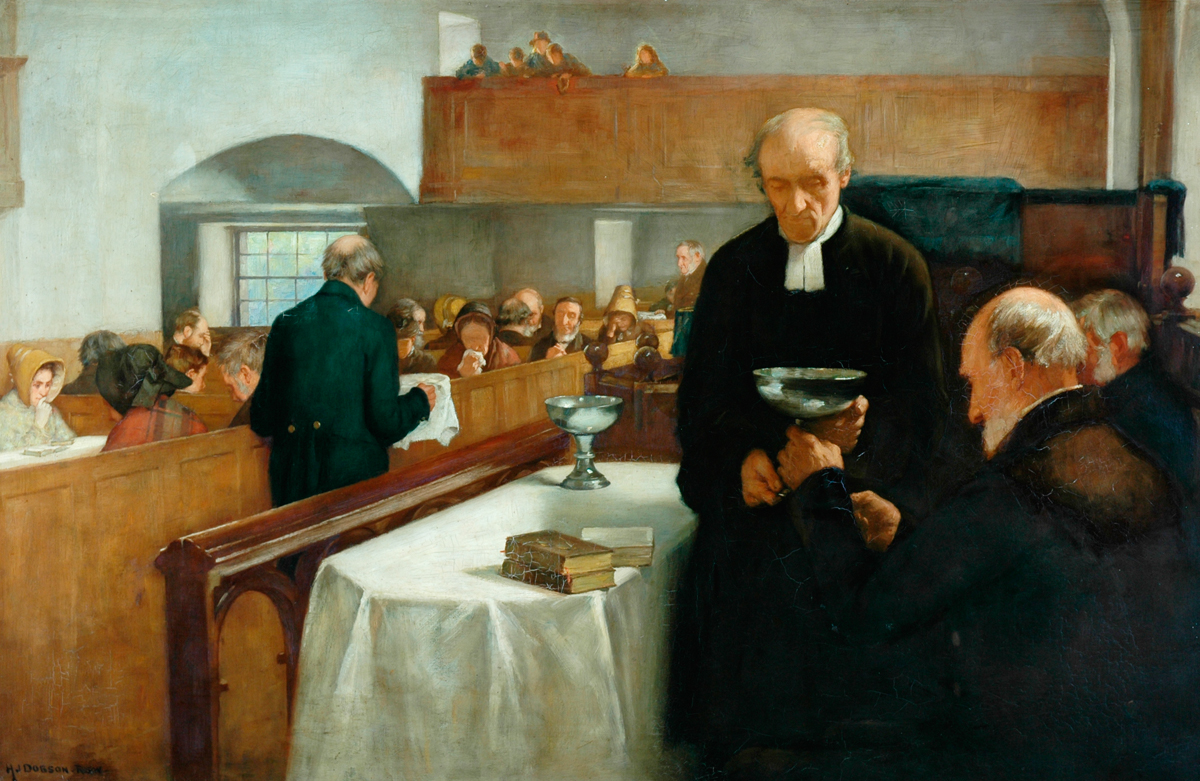
A Scottish Sacrament, by Henry John Dobson

Communion was to take place after the morning sermon, and was to be celebrated often, though the Directory does not specify precisely how often; to the Scots, quarterly or half-yearly was sufficient, but some English Puritan churches observed monthly, while most Anglicans only practiced communion once a year. Those wishing to receive communion were to sit "about" or "at" the communion table. The disjunctive words "about" and "at" were a compromise between the Scottish view of the necessity of sitting around a table and a common view in England that partaking in the pews was in order. The words of institution from the Gospels of Mark, Matthew, and Luke, or from Paul's First Epistle to the Corinthians, were an essential part of the celebration. These were followed by a prayer of thanksgiving to God "to vouchsafe his gracious presence, and the effectual working of his Spirit in us; and so to sanctify these elements, both of bread and wine, and to bless his own ordinance, that we may receive by faith the body and blood of Jesus Christ crucified for us, and so feed upon him that he may be one with us, and we with him, and that he may live in us and we in him and to him, who hath loved us and given himself for us." The bread was then to be broken and shared and the wine also. The collection of alms for the poor was to be organised so that it in no way hindered the service.

Marriage involved the consent of the parties, publication of intention, and a religious service in a place of public worship on any day of the year, but preferably not the Lord's Day. It consisted of prayer, an explanation of the origin and purpose of marriage, an enquiry as to if there is any impediment, the exchange of vows, the pronouncement that the couple be husband and wife, and a closing prayer. A register of marriages was to be kept.

The Directory made no provision for burial services, on the grounds that burial services had inspired superstitious practices. It did, however, permit "civil respects or deferences" at the burial, "appropriate to the rank and condition of the party deceased," to put the friends of the deceased in mind of their duty to improve the occasion.

Henry Hammond, later Chaplain to Charles I, advanced six objections to the Directory in his 1645 work, A View of the New Directory and a Vindication of the Ancient Liturgy of the Church of England. Hammond wrote that the Directory avoids (1) a prescribed form or liturgy, (2) outward or bodily worship, (3) uniformity in worship, (4) congregants participating through responses in prayers, hymns, and readings, (5) the division of prayers into several collects or portions, and (6) ceremonies such as kneeling in communion, the cross in baptism, and the ring in marriage. In respect of (1) this has been covered already. In respect of (2), doting on ceremonies and outward gestures (e.g. bowing to the east) was indeed avoided. As for (3), it was intended that there be uniformity in the parts of worship though not the words, while in regard to (4) and (5) the Directory is not so opposite as Hammond suggests although it does not seem very positive on singing. In regard to (6), kneeling in communion and the cross in baptism had been matters of long and significant controversy between the parties in the Church of England.

Hammond then noted sixteen items avoided in the Directory which are more particularly related to the parts of the service: (1) pronouncing of absolution, (2) the necessity of singing psalms and other hymns of the church, (3) the use of the doxology, (4) the use of the ancient creeds, (5) the frequent use of the Lord’s Prayer and prayers for the King, (6) saints days and the liturgical year, (7) the reading of the commandments and associated prayers, (8) the order of the offertory, (9) private baptism, (10) a prescribed catechism (although this was covered by the later Westminster Larger and Shorter Catechisms), (11) confirmation, (12) solemnities of burial for the sake of the living, (13) thanksgiving after childbirth, (14) communion for the sick, (15) The Commination service at the beginning of Lent, (16) the observation of Lent, Rogation days and the Ember weeks. Several of these items (1-5,7,10) had use in other Reformed churches, but the major items did not.

== Use by the Church of England ==
In some areas of England, notably in London and Lancashire, Presbyterian classes (presbyteries) were set up in 1646 and operated until the Restoration of Charles II in 1660. Although by no means universally adopted even within these areas, there is good evidence to show that many of these parishes both bought and used the Directory. It was probably also used in parishes with Congregationalist, or Independent, ministers. However, those parishes that did adopt the Directory were in the minority, and the Book of Common Prayer continued in use secretly across much of the country, particularly in relation to funerals. It is clear that the Directory was deeply unpopular with the majority of the population, and some of the best evidence for its use can be deduced from negative reactions to it, in particular the dramatically reduced baptism rate in those parishes where the Directory was adopted.

== Use by the Church of Scotland ==
The General Assembly of the Church of Scotland adopted the Westminster Directory during that Assembly's 10 Session on 3 February 1645. In adopting the text of the Directory, however, the Assembly provided several clarifications and provisions and later, during Session 14 on February 7, 1645, it provided even further clarifications for application within the Church of Scotland. The adopting acts, therefore, attempted to keep intact those traditions and practices of the Scottish church where they differed from those of some English churches, whether Puritan or Independent, so long as these differences proved no offense to those English churches. Such differences in implementation included, for instance, the Scots coming forward to sit around the communion table, retaining the use of the epiklesis, the singing of a psalm while tables dismissed and came forward, the distribution of bread and wine by communicants among themselves, and "a sermon of Thanksgiving" after communion. The Westminster Directory did, however, have the effect of suppressing the Scottish "Reader's Service" and of eliminating the practice of ministers bowing in the pulpit to pray prior to the sermon.

== Bibliography ==
- W. A. Shaw, A History of the English Church during the Civil War and under the Commonwealth 1640–1660, 2 vols., (London, 1900)
- F. Procter, A New History of the Book of Common Prayer, rev. W. H. Frere, (Macmillan: London, 1919)
- Judith Maltby, Prayer Book and People in Elizabethan and Early Stuart England, (Cambridge University Press: Cambridge, 1998)
- John Morrill, ‘The Church in England 1642–1649’, in Reactions to the English Civil War, ed. John Morrill, (Macmillan: Basingstoke, 1982), pp 89–114, reprinted in John Morrill, The Nature of the English Revolution, (Longman: London, 1993)
- Christopher Durston, ‘Puritan Rule and the Failure of Cultural Revolution, 1645-1660’, in The Culture of English Puritanism, 1560–1700, ed. Christopher Durston and Jacqueline Eales, (Macmillan: Basingstoke, 1996), p 210–233
- Minutes of the Manchester Presbyterian Classis, ed. W A Shaw, 3 vols., Chetham Society, new series, 20, 22 & 24 (1890–1891)

== Note ==
1. The full name of the book was A Directory for Public Worship of God throughout the Three Kingdoms of England, Scotland, and Ireland. Together with an Ordinance of Parliament for the taking away of the Book of Common Prayer, and the Establishing and Observing of this Present Directory throughout the Kingdom of England and the Dominion of Wales. The full name of the 1645 Scottish Act was CHARLES I. Parl. 3. Sess. An ACT of the PARLIAMENT of the KINGDOM of SCOTLAND, approving and establishing the DIRECTORY for Publick Worship. AT EDINBURGH, February 6, 1645
