= Subordinate standard =

Protestant regulatory statement

A subordinate standard is a Reformed confession of faith, catechism or other doctrinal or regulatory statement subscribed to by a Protestant church, setting out key elements of religious belief and church governance. It is subordinate to the Bible as the supreme standard, which is held as divinely inspired and without error.

Examples of such standards are the Westminster Confession of Faith, drawn up by the 1646 Westminster Assembly as part of the Westminster Standards to be a confession of the Church of England. It became and remains the subordinate standard of doctrine in the Church of Scotland, and has been influential within Presbyterian churches worldwide. The Westminster Confession of Faith was modified and adopted by Congregationalists in England in the form of the Savoy Declaration (1658). Likewise, the Baptists of England modified the Savoy Declaration to produce the Second London Baptist Confession (1689). The Three Forms of Unity (the Belgic Confession, Heidelberg Catechism and the Canons of Dort) were adopted as subordinate standards in the Dutch Reformed Church, a practice which was embraced by most Dutch Reformed denominations and federations around the world.

In Scotland, the Scots Confession of 1560, drawn up by John Knox and other leaders of the Protestant Reformation, was the first subordinate standard for the Protestant church in Scotland. Enacted in law in 1567, it was superseded by the Westminster Confession in 1648.

While some churches identify only one key document as their subordinate standard, others specify several. For example, in 1789 the Presbyterian Church in the United States of America adopted the Westminster Confession of Faith, together with the Larger Catechism and the Shorter Catechism, but modified the Confession to bring its teaching on civil government in line with American practices and removed references to the Pope as an Antichrist. The Presbyterian Reformed Church (North America) adopted the Westminster Confession of Faith along with the Larger and Shorter Catechisms and Directory of Public Worship, while the (separate) Reformed Presbyterian Church of North America considers as its constitution the same standards along with the Testimony, Directory for Church Government, and Book of Discipline. In Australia, the Presbyterian Church of Australia accepts the Westminster Confession of Faith, read in the light of a Declaratory Statement of 1901. The Presbyterian Church of Victoria, one of its constituent bodies, also subscribes to the "general principles" of the Larger and Shorter Catechisms, the Form of Presbyterial Church Government, the Directory of Public Worship, and the 1578 Second Book of Discipline. The Presbyterian Church in Canada produced a Declaration of Faith Concerning Church and Nation deemed a "subordinate standard" of the PCC in 1954.

Churches specifying only the Westminster Confession of Faith include the Reformed Presbyterian Church of Scotland and Free Presbyterian Church of Scotland. The United Free Church of Scotland specified the Westminster Confession while asserting the church's right to modify it.
