= Christian liberty =

Aspect of religious doctrine

In Christianity, the doctrine of Christian liberty or Christian freedom states that Christians have been set free in Christ and are thus free to serve him. Lester DeKoster views the two aspects of Christian liberty as "freedom from" and "freedom for" and suggests that the pivot between the two is the divine law.

In the New Testament, Paul refers to himself as "free": "I am free, I am an apostle". He asserts in his letter to the Galatians that Christ has set believers free.

In the area of Christian living, liberty is often discussed in terms of what activities Christians are free to engage in. Modern-day issues concerning Christian liberty include alcohol drinking, women's head-coverings, and birth control. These things are sometimes called adiaphora, or "things indifferent".

Some Christian denominations who require office-bearers to subscribe to certain creeds and confessions allow liberty of opinion on non-essential matters.

== See also ==
- Martin Luther's treatise On the Freedom of a Christian
