= Age of accountability =

Concept in Christian theology

In Christian theology, the age of accountability (also called the age of discretion) is the age at which children are deemed to be accountable for their beliefs and actions.

== Specific ages ==
Some Christian denominations set a specific age with respect to the age of accountability. This includes seven in the Catholic Church, and eight in Mormonism. Other people put the age of accountability at 12 (since that was the age at which Jesus began to demonstrate his understanding of right and wrong) or 13 (the age of the Jewish Bar Mitzvah).

Other groups accept the concept of an age of accountability but avoid putting a specific number on it. John MacArthur suggests that "the Lord in His wisdom didn't identify a specific moment. God knows when each soul is accountable."

== Denominational views ==
=== Catholicism ===
According to the Canon law of the Catholic Church, before the age of seven, a child "is considered not responsible for oneself", but after that "is presumed to have the use of reason." In the Catholic Church, an individual is required to make an act of faith when they come to the age of accountability.

=== Reformed ===
Reformed theologians tend to reject the concept altogether. Ligon Duncan argues that although there is an "age of discretion", the age of accountability is conception – that is, "there is no time in a human being's life when he or she is not accountable to God." Duncan suggests that

The idea of an age of accountability arose in the 19th century and the 20th century amongst non-Calvinistic Protestants who were attempting to address the issue of infant mortality and explain on the basis of Arminianism and freewill why all children who had been unable to exercise their own unaided faith by freewill didn't go to hell.

=== Methodism ===
Methodist doctrine teaches that the atonement of Christ "is unconditionally effective in the salvation of those mentally incompetent from birth, of those converted persons who have become mentally incompetent, and of children under the age of accountability." Wesleyan-Arminian theology teaches that those who die before reaching the age of accountability will go to heaven. Upon reaching the age of accountability, persons are thereafter responsible for making a decision to follow Jesus. As Methodism affirms infant baptism as a sign and seal of the covenant of grace, "Christian children are baptized into the covenant community and later given training through Confirmation to accept the covenant for themselves at an age of accountability."

== Implications ==
=== Infant salvation ===
The age of accountability thus has implications for the salvation of infants. Theologians like John MacArthur argue that any child who dies before the age of accountability is saved.

Stephen Wellum connects belief in an age of accountability with the rejection of inherited guilt:

Most Christian traditions teach that children enter the world fallen due to Adam's sin, but some argue children are not guilty before God until they knowingly disobey God's commands. If the child dies before reaching that age, he or she receives salvation based on Christ's finished work. Once the child knowingly sins, however, they become accountable for their actions and have reached the age of accountability. At that point, salvation comes through conscious, active repentance and faith in Christ.

=== Sacraments ===
The age of accountability also has implications for believer's baptism. Baptists believe that people should only be baptized after the age of accountability. Similarly, traditions that practise infant baptism usually wait until a person has undergone confirmation before he or she can partake of the Eucharist, and this is connected to the age of discretion.

== See also ==
- Person (Catholic canon law)
