= Lester DeKoster =

American librarian and editor (1915-2009)

Lester De Koster
- Born: April 21, 1915; Zeeland, Michigan, U.S.
- Died: April 19, 2009 (aged 93); Grand Rapids, Michigan, U.S.
- Occupations: Librarian, educator, author, editor
- Organizations: Calvin University, Christian Reformed Church in North America
- Notable work: Communism and Christian Faith (1962); The Deacon’s Handbook (1980); Light for the City (2004)
- Spouse: Ruth De Vries
- Children: 4

Lester Ronald DeKoster (21 April 1915 – 19 April 2009) was an American librarian, educator, editor and author affiliated with the Christian Reformed Church of North America (CRC) and Calvin College in Grand Rapids, Michigan.

== Early life and education ==
De Koster was born in Zeeland, Michigan, on April 21 1915. In his youth he was a competitive tennis player. During World War II, he served in the United States Navy. After the war, he taught and coached debate at South High School in Grand Rapids before joining Calvin College as a member of the faculty. His undergraduate degree was from Calvin College. He then earned a master’s degree in speech from the University of Michigan and a master’s degree in library science from the University of Chicago.

== Career ==
DeKoster was director of the library at Calvin College and Seminary from 1951 to 1969. He earned a doctorate from the University of Michigan in 1964, where he wrote his dissertation on John Calvin. As library director, he expanded Calvin College’s holdings in Calvin studies. In addition to his work as a librarian, he was also a speech professor at Calvin.

After his retirement he served as editor of The Banner, the official magazine of the CRC, for ten years. He wrote several books, including Communism and Christian Faith (1962) and Work, the Meaning of Your Life: A Christian Perspective (1982). DeKoster established the Christian's Library Press with Gerard Berghoef, with whom he also wrote The Elders Handbook: A Practical Guide for Church Leaders (1979) as well as The Deacon’s Handbook: A Manual of Stewardship (1980). DeKoster and Berghoef described work as “the fundamental form of stewardship” and as a means for spiritual growth.

DeKoster's final book was on John Calvin and the role of preaching in modern civic life.

== Philosophy and viewpoints ==
DeKoster emphasized preaching the Word and church-based evangelism. He argued that the Great Commission was addressed to the Church rather than to individual Christians. He identified with confessional Reformed Christianity and criticized fundamentalism. He also supported cooperation with Roman Catholics. He was opposed to abortion and rejected the "new theology" associated with Harry M. Kuitert. He was also critical of the teaching of evolution and Marxism.

== Personal life and death ==
DeKoster married Ruth De Vries in 1941. The couple were married for nearly 68 years and had four children. He died on April 19, 2009 in Grand Rapids, two days before his ninety-fourth birthday.

== Selected publications ==
- DeKoster, Lester (1956). All Ye That Labor: An Essay on Christianity, Communism, and the Problem of Evil. Grand Rapids: Eerdmans.
- DeKoster, Lester (1962). Communism and Christian Faith. Grand Rapids: Eerdmans.
- DeKoster, Lester (1966). The Christian and the John Birch Society. Grand Rapids: Wm. B. Eerdmans.
- DeKoster, Lester (1975). How to Read the Bible. Grand Rapids: Baker Book House.
- Berghoef, Gerard; DeKoster, Lester (1979). The Elders Handbook: A Practical Guide for Church Leaders. Grand Rapids: Christian's Library Press. ISBN 978-0-934874-00-7.
- Berghoef, Gerard; DeKoster, Lester (1980). The Deacons Handbook: A Manual of Stewardship. Grand Rapids: Christian's Library Press.
- Berghoef, Gerard; DeKoster, Lester (1982). The Believers Handbook: A Guide to the Christian Life. Grand Rapids: Christian's Library Press. ISBN 978-0-934874-03-8.
- DeKoster, Lester (1982). Work: The Meaning of Your Life: A Christian Perspective. Grand Rapids: Christian's Library Press. ISBN 978-1-942503-42-2.
- Berghoef, Gerard; DeKoster, Lester (1984). Liberation Theology: The Church's Future Shock: Explanation, Analysis, Critique, Alternative. Grand Rapids: Christian's Library Press.
- Berghoef, Gerard; DeKoster, Lester (1989). The Great Divide: Christianity or Evolution?. Edinburgh; Carlisle, PA: Banner of Truth Trust. ISBN 978-0-85151-558-8.
- DeKoster, Lester (1996). I Believe—Living the Apostles' Creed. Grand Rapids: Christian's Library Press. ISBN 978-0-934874-13-7.
- De Koster, Lester (2004). Light for the City: Calvin's Preaching, Source of Life and Liberty. Grand Rapids: Eerdmans.
