= Profession of faith =

Personal declaration of faith

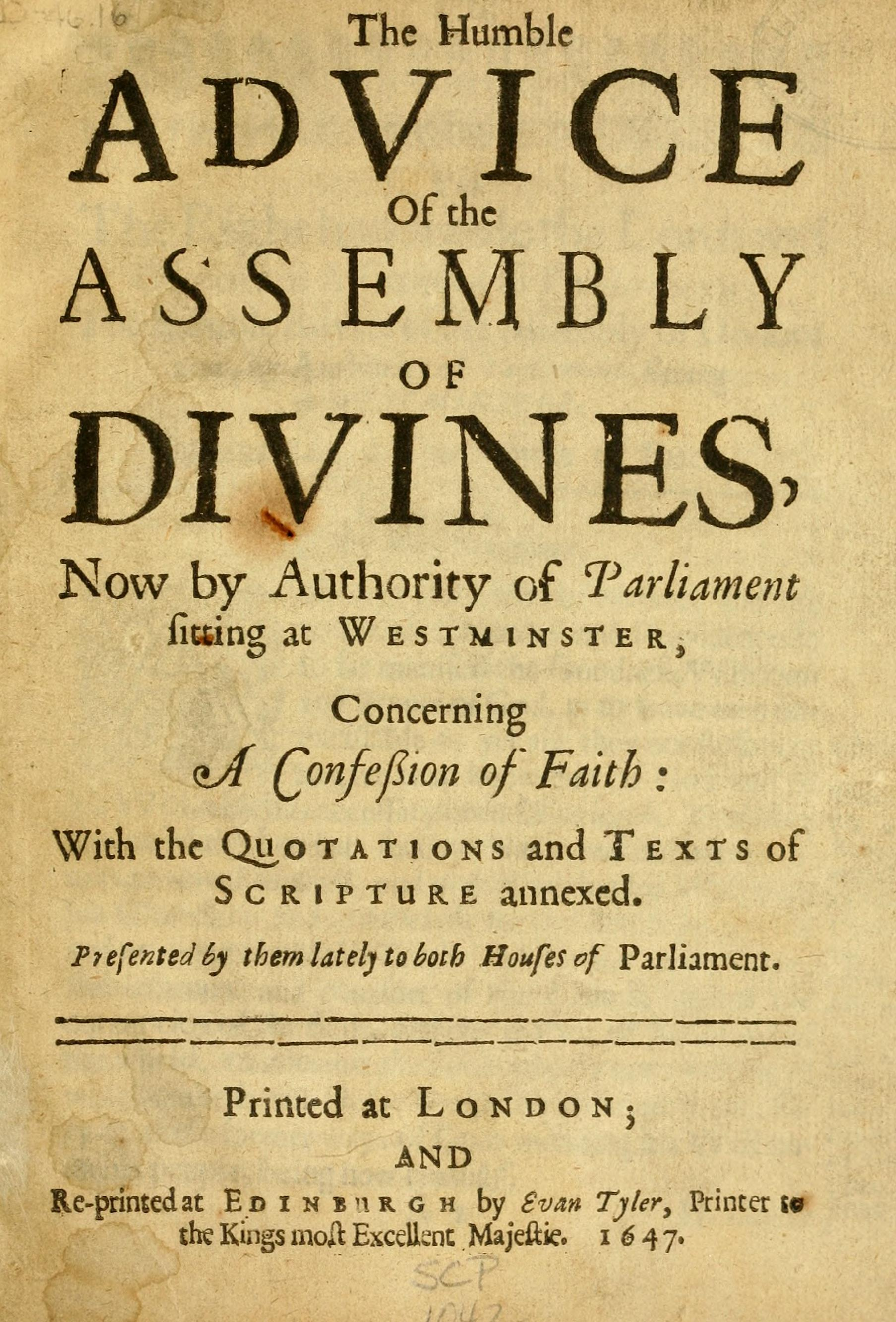

A profession of faith is a personal and public statement of a belief or faith.

== Judaism ==
Among the Jews, the profession of faith takes the form of Shema Israel (שמע ישראל in Hebrew), Shema Israel Adonai Eloheinu, Adonai Echad; is a quote from Deuteronomy (6:4): "Hear Israel, the Lord is our God, the Lord is One."

== Christianity ==
=== Origins ===
The profession of faith has its origin in the New Testament, where believers, such as Cornelius, declared their faith in Jesus during baptism. In the First Epistle to Timothy in chapter 6 verse 12, Paul of Tarsus reminds Timothy of his profession of faith in front of several people. In the Early Church, the kerygma, or the proclamation of Jesus Christ Messiah and Son of God, death and risen, summed up the profession of faith.

=== By denomination ===
Various Christian churches require people to make a personal profession of faith according to a prescribed formula, when joining their Christian denomination as a member.

==== Catholic Church ====
The rite of reception of baptized Christians into the communion of the Catholic Church states that "one who was born and baptized outside the visible communion of the Catholic Church is not required to make an abjuration of heresy [publicly] but simply a profession of faith". Today, normally, an abjuration of heresy is made in the privacy of the confessional, though in the past it was often a public matter. After joining with the congregation in reciting the Nicene Creed, the person being received into the Catholic Church makes the following profession of faith:

I believe and profess all that the holy Catholic Church believes, teaches, and proclaims to be revealed by God.

A long version of this Profession of Catholic Faith was composed by Pope Pius IV and was formerly used as part of one's devotions. Such a devotion was rooted in the Council of Trent.

As indicated in the Rite of Christian Initiation of Adults, adults joining the Catholic Church were formerly asked to abjure the previous faith to which they belonged ("Hebrew superstition", the Islamic "sect of the infidel", or "the heretical errors of the evil sect" from which they came). The profession of faith used was the Tridentine Profession of Faith.

==== Lutheran churches ====
When a baptized individual joins a Lutheran church, he or she becomes a Lutheran by making a profession of faith.

==== Anglican churches ====
In the Anglican churches, a profession of faith is made by "those elected or nominated in the office of bishop". For baptisms in the Church of England, the Apostles' Creed is the profession of faith made by the candidate (or his/her sponsors).

==== Methodist churches ====
In the United Methodist Church, a profession of faith is made by one's parents or sponsors when one receives the sacrament of Holy Baptism.

A profession of faith is taken by confirmands, as well as new Christians joining the United Methodist Church.

==== Baptist, Pentecostal and nondenominational Christianity ====
In Baptist, Pentecostal and nondenominational Christianity, which adheres to the doctrine of the believers' Church, the profession of faith consists in witnessing to one's personal conversion and to one's faith in Jesus, before the believer's baptism. This rite is thus reserved for adolescents and adults.

== Islam ==
Among Muslims, the profession of faith is called shahâda (in Arabic language, "testimony"), is one of the five obligations of the believer, and the most important.

== See also ==
- Act of Faith (Christian)
- Credo of the People of God
- Oath Against Modernism
