= Confessional subscription =

In confessional churches, office-bearers (such as ministers and elders) are required to "subscribe" (or agree) to the church's confession of faith. In Presbyterian denominations, this is the Westminster Confession of Faith, while in Confessional Lutheranism it is the Book of Concord. The degree to which subscribers are required to agree with the confession varies from denomination to denomination.

== History ==
The Presbyterian Church in Ireland wrestled with the issue of confessional subscription in the early 18th century. In 1726, the Synod of Ulster expelled ministers who refused to subscribe to the Westminster Confession of Faith – this group formed the Synod of Antrim, which eventually became the Non-subscribing Presbyterian Church of Ireland. In the American colonies, the Synod of Philadelphia initially did not have a confession of faith: while the Scots-Irish stressed precise theological formulation, professional ministry, and the orderly and authoritarian nature of church government, the New Englanders emphasized "spontaneity, vital impulse, adaptability." The Scots-Irish believed that confessional subscription would preserve Reformed orthodoxy from the threat of rationalistic ideas, while the New England party preferred declaring the Bible as the common standard for faith and practice. The impasse was resolved with the passage of the Adopting Act of 1729. This was a compromise that required subscription to the "essential and necessary" parts of the Westminster Standards – what was deemed to be essential and necessary was left to individual presbyteries to determine.

== Levels of subscription ==
=== Strict subscription ===
Strict subscription, sometimes called "full subscription", means that subscribers must agree to everything in the confession, without exception. This was the original approach in the Church of Scotland: in 1693, it required all ministers to affirm, "I do sincerely own and declare the above Confession of Faith... to be a Confession of my faith, and that I own the doctrine contained therein to be the true doctrine." However, minor reservations regarding government and church/state relations were allowed. In 1711, this was changed to requiring that ministers believe "the whole doctrine of the Confession... to be the truths of God, contained in the Scriptures of the Old and New Testaments". In 1889, this was changed back to something very similar to the original wording: "I declare the Confession of Faith ... to be the Confession of my faith."

=== Good faith subscription ===
A good faith subscription allows subscribers to make certain exceptions to things according to confessional standards. In presbyterian denominations, these exceptions are normally approved by a presbytery. This is the position of the Presbyterian Church in America, adopted in 2002. Its Book of Church Order says,

The court may grant an exception to any difference of doctrine only if, in the court’s judgment, the applicant’s declared difference is not in accord with any fundamental of our system of doctrine because the difference is neither hostile to the system nor strikes at the vitals of religion.

=== System subscription ===
In a system subscription (sometimes called "loose subscription"), a subscriber is required to agree with the "system of doctrine" of the confessional standard. According to Morton H. Smith, "System subscription holds to the adoption of all the fundamental and essential doctrines of the system. Other expressions of the Confessions and Catechisms are not considered essential to the system of doctrine as a matter of indifference, whether the ordinand adopts them or not."

This was the approach adopted by the Presbyterian Church in the United States of America from its founding in 1789: ministers promised to "sincerely receive and adopt the confession of faith of this church, as containing the system of doctrine taught in the Holy Scriptures." This is still the form of vow used in the Orthodox Presbyterian Church.

Charles Hodge noted that the phrase "system of doctrine" was interpreted in three different ways: (1) "every proposition of the Confession" (equivalent to strict subscription described above); (2) the doctrines "peculiar to" the Reformed churches; (3) the "essential doctrines of Christianity." Of the first, Hodge argued that "Such a rule of interpretation can never be practically carried out, without dividing the Church into innumerable fragments. It is impossible that a body of several thousand ministers and elders should think alike on all the topics embraced in such an extended and minute formula of belief." The third, he said, "has been tried, and found to produce the greatest disorder and contention." Thus, Hodge concluded that the only viable view was the second one.

== Declaratory statements ==
Some Presbyterian denominations have added a declaratory statement to the Westminster Confession of Faith to clarify, modify, or soften its teaching and thus make it easier for office-bearers to subscribe without scruples. Many of these statements include a clause granting liberty of opinion on non-essential matters.

== "Quia" versus "Quatenus" subscription ==
In Confessional Lutheranism, a model of "quia" subscription is used. From the Latin for "because", the Book of Concord is adhered to because it is faithful to the Scriptures – the subscriber believes there is no contradiction between the Book of Concord and the Scriptures. The alternative, "quatenus" (Latin for "insofar as") subscription means there might be a contradiction of the Scriptures in the Book of Concord, in which case the subscriber would hold to the Scriptures against the Book of Concord.

A similar distinction exists in Reformed churches: in 1816, King William I of the Netherlands reorganized the Dutch Reformed Church so that the form of subscription was changed from accepting the Three Forms of Unity because they agreed with the Word of God (as laid down by the Synod of Dort) to acceptance insofar as they agreed with the Word.
