= Basis of Union (Presbyterian Church of Australia) =

The Basis of Union of the Presbyterian Church of Australia is the document under which the constituent state churches agreed to unite at its first General Assembly on 24 July 1901, and is still a foundational text for the Uniting Church. The Basis of Union appears in Acts of Parliament concerning the Presbyterian Church of Australia.

== Background ==
At the turn of the twentieth century, every Australian state had its own Presbyterian church, formed from unions in the nineteenth century. According to Ian Breward, in 1879, "leading Presbyterians in the eastern colonies began exploring the possibilities of meeting in federal assemblies." The Federal Assembly of the Presbyterian Churches of Australia and Tasmania was formed in 1886, as a means of drawing the constituent churches closer together. The involvement of New Zealand, seemed a possibility for a time, but then fell through.

The union of 1901 was nationwide and federal. The 19th century presbyterian unions in the Australian states had all constituted an organic union of denominations from separate traditions, even though they shared a common doctrinal standard. This union, however, involved churches of the same denomination in different locations. Alexander Yule could say on the eve of the Union that it was "not the healing of a schism, nor the removal of an inherited division, like the recent Presbyterian Union in Scotland."

The individual state churches also kept their individual identities and retained many of their rights and privileges. F. Maxwell Bradshaw has argued that the loss of the continued identity of the state churches, "would lead to immense and far reaching legal difficulties."

R. Gordon Balfour notes that the purpose of union was to give greater uniformity to ecclesiastical procedure and worship, a united effort in missionary work, and "common action on great public questions."

The declaratory statement in the Basis of Union is modelled on the 1879 Declaratory Act of the United Presbyterian Church in Scotland, as well as the 1882 Declaratory Act of the Presbyterian Church of Victoria. However, while the Declaratory Act of 1882 mentions examples of possible points of doctrine on which liberty of opinion is allowed - such as the interpretation of the "six days" in the Genesis creation narrative - the declaratory statement in the Basis of Union provides no such example.

== Contents ==
The first point of the Basis on Union affirmed that the "Supreme Standard" of the united church would be the "Word of God contained in the Scriptures of the Old and New Testaments," while the second point affirmed that its "Subordinate Standard" would be the Westminster Confession of Faith, read in the light of a declaratory statement. This in turn consisted of six points.

=== Declaratory statement ===
Point 1 of the declaratory statement presses the necessity of preaching the free offer of salvation, and the "cardinal facts" of Jesus Christ's incarnation, atoning life and death, resurrection and ascension, as well as the bestowment of his Holy Spirit.

The declaratory statement proceeds to qualify some statements in the Westminster Confession of Faith. Point 2 maintains the doctrine of predestination while affirming the free offer of the gospel. Point 3 states that "while none are saved except through the mediation of Christ and by the grace of the Holy Spirit," it is not required to believe that any who die in infancy are lost, or that God may not extend his grace to any beyond "the pale of ordinary means." Point 4 clarifies the Confession's teaching on good works, and notes that unregenerate people are "yet capable of affections and actions which of themselves are virtuous and praiseworthy." Point 6 discusses the doctrine of the civil magistrate and rejects "intolerant or persecuting principles."

Point 5 allows "liberty of opinion" on matters in the Westminster Confession which are "not essential to the doctrine therein taught."

=== Provision for changes ===
The remainder of the Basis of Union is taken with provisions for amendments or revisions to the Westminster Confession. It also includes a statement for ministers and elders to sign at their ordination.

== See also ==
- Basis of Union (Uniting Church in Australia)
