= Directory for Family Worship =

The Directory for Family Worship is a book of general directions for private, family worship in the Calvinist tradition. It was approved by the General Assembly of the Church of Scotland, the highest court of the Church of Scotland, on 24 August 1647.

== History ==
While generally approving of the products of the Westminster Assembly (namely, the Westminster Standards), the Church of Scotland viewed it as incomplete without directions for private worship. The Directory was approved by the General Assembly at Edinburgh, Scotland on August 24, 1647, at the tenth session of meeting. The directory became the standard of family worship in the Church of Scotland and has been influential within Presbyterian churches worldwide, including to this day.

In America, for example, it was highlighted in 1733 by the Synod of Philadelphia to seek "some proper means to revive the declining Power of Godliness," recommended "to all our ministers and members to take particular Care about visiting families, and press family and secret worship, according to the Westminster Directory."

== The Act of the General Assembly ==
The wording of the act which the Assembly of the Church of Scotland passed in relation to the Directory of Family Worship is given verbatim below. It was titled: Act for observing the Directions of the GENERAL ASSEMBLY for secret and private Worship, and mutual Edification; and censuring such as neglect Family-worship.

The wording of the Act suggests the seriousness with which the Church leaders of the time perceived the matter of Family Worship, and the level to which they implored everyone to be obedient to the call to participate within family worship. The matter of family worship was so important that, in the preface, they wrote that if any family did not practice regular family worship, the head of that family (i.e. the father / husband) was to be “gravely and sadly reproved by the session” if he was deliberately neglectful of his duty to provide spiritual leadership to his family. If he did not repent of this, he was to be barred from the Lord's Supper until he repented. The home, as the Puritans were quoted as saying, was to be “a little church.”

“The General Assembly, after mature deliberation, doth approve the following Rules and Directions for cherishing piety, and for preventing division and schism; and doth appoint ministers and ruling elders in each congregation to take special care that these Directions be observed and followed; as likewise, that presbyteries and provincial synods enquire and make trial whether the said Directions be duly observed in their bounds; and to reprove or censure [according to the quality of the offence], such as shall be found reprovable or censurable therein. And, to the end that these directions may not be rendered ineffectual and unprofitable among some, through the usual neglect of the very substance of the duty of Family-worship, the Assembly doth further require and appoint ministers and ruling elders to make diligent search and enquiry, in the congregations committed to their charge respectively, whether there be among them any family or families which use to neglect this necessary duty; and if any such family be found, the head of the family is to be first admonished privately to amend his fault; and in the case of his continuing therein, he is to be gravely and sadly reproved by the session; after which reproof, if he be still found to neglect Family-worship, let him be, for his obstinacy in such an offence, suspended and debarred from the Lord’s Supper, as being justly esteemed unworthy to communicate therein, until he amend.”

== The Directory of Family Worship ==
The Directions Of The General Assembly, Concerning Secret And Private Worship, And Mutual Edification; For Cherishing Piety, For Maintaining Unity, And Avoiding Schism And Division was introduced with:

"BESIDES the publick worship in congregations, mercifully established in this land in great purity, it is expedient and necessary that secret worship of each person alone, and private worship of families, be pressed and set up; that, with national reformation, the profession and power of godliness, both personal and domestick, be advanced."

The Directory is split into 14 sections, most of which are a paragraph or two. A summary of each section is given below.

1. Everyone should take part in private worship, and the head of the household should encourage their family to do so.
2. The duties of family worship include prayer, the reading of scripture, and an explanation of the text so that all may able to grow in faith.
3. It is the special duty of the head of the family to read the scriptures and explain them to the family. And, the rest of the family should look to the head of the family to guide them.
4. The head of the family is to take care that no one withdraws from family worship. The minister is to stir up those who are lazy to be equipped in this role.
5. Those who are lazy or whose Christian faith is wavering should not lead family worship
6. Family worship should, for the most part, be a private matter
7. Family worship should usually be just one family unit, rather than collections of different ones combined.
8. The head of the household is to encourage the family to attend worship on Sunday, and to either lead them in further worship, or encourage private devotions throughout the day.
9. All those who can pray should pray, and those who are too young can use set outlines for prayer. An outline for prayer is given in this section.
10. Family worship should be sincere, and elders within the church should encourage families within the church to be involved in it.
11. In addition to [2] there are special duties of humiliation, repentance and thanksgiving which should be carefully used.
12. Every member of the church should strive to stir themselves and others up in the faith.
13. If comfort and counsel cannot be found within family worship, then a Pastor or other Christian should be sought out.
14. If people are away and mixing with different family units (e.g. business, combined family holidays etc.) then whoever is most equipped should lead family worship.

== Bibliography ==
- J. W. Alexander (1850). The Nature, Warrant, and History of Family Worship. Alexander was the eldest son of Archibald Alexander, the first professor of Princeton Theological Seminary.
- A Westminster Bibliography (Part 6) by Dr. Richard Bacon (1996), An investigation of the Westminster Assembly regarding the construction of this document.
