= God, Heaven, and Har Magedon =

God, Heaven and Har Magedon: A Covenantal Tale of Cosmos and Telos (2006) is a book by Reformed theologian Meredith G. Kline. The work sums up Kline's contributions to biblical and covenant theology, and is written for a more general audience than his other books.

In a review done by Brett A. McNeil of the Orthodox Presbyterian Church, he says, "[Kline] shows that eschatology permeates the entire Bible, and he establishes the biblical teaching of "Armageddon" in clear and concrete detail. His succinct description of covenant history and mountain imagery is profound and helpful, as is his defense of an amillennial view of the kingdom."
