= D. G. Hart =

American historian (born 1956)

- Born: 1956 (age 69–70)
- Education: Temple University; Johns Hopkins University; Harvard Divinity School; Westminster Theological Seminary
- Occupation: American religious historian
- Known for: Biography of John Gresham Machen

Darryl Glenn Hart (born 1956) is an American religious and social historian.

== Early life and education ==
Hart grew up in the Philadelphia area, and received a B.A. from Temple University. He also earned masters degrees from Westminster Theological Seminary, Harvard University, and Johns Hopkins University. He was awarded a Ph.D. in U.S. History from Johns Hopkins University in 1988.

== Career ==
Hart is Distinguished Associate Professor of History at Hillsdale College in Hillsdale, Michigan. He previously served as dean of academic affairs at Westminster Seminary California from 2000 to 2003, taught church history and served as librarian at Westminster Theological Seminary in Philadelphia, directed the Institute for the Study of American Evangelicals at Wheaton College, and was Director of Partnered Projects, Academic Programs, and Faculty Development at the Intercollegiate Studies Institute in Wilmington, Delaware. He is an elder in the Orthodox Presbyterian Church.

Reviewer John Hesselink states that Hart's Calvinism: A History (2013) compares favorably with the 1954 classic The history and character of Calvinism (1954) by John T. McNeil:

Hart's book is excellent in many ways. It supersedes McNeil's book if for no other reason than it benefits from later studies on Calvin as well as Reformation scholarship of the last 60 years. Moreover it deals with the worldwide spread of the Reformed tradition in Asia and Africa, areas not covered by McNeil.

In a Wall Street Journal review of Calvinism: A History, Barton Swaim describes him as, "a cantankerous conservative, a stalwart Presbyterian and a talented polemicist with a delightfully perverse sense of humor."

Stephen J. Nichols states that, like many other theologians, Hart is of the opinion that "theology, like nature, abhors a vacuum," in that theologizing is influenced by culture.

Hart follows in the tradition of J. Gresham Machen (to whom he dedicated his book Secular Faith) in espousing an approach to politics that engages at the level of the individual rather than that of the church. Hart makes the observation that efforts, "to use Christianity for public or political ends fundamentally distort the Christian religion." In Secular Faith Hart argues for the church to follow its mission by standing apart as a witness, suggesting that the nature of Christianity is "otherworldly", and criticizing those who "have tried to use their faith for political engagement".

In 1998 Christianity Today described him as "the prolific writer-librarian at Westminster Seminary in Philadelphia". He is also co-editor (along with John Muether) of the Nicotine Theological Journal.

== Works ==
- Protestants and Patriots: Presbyterians in the Age of Revolution (University of Notre Dame Press, 2026)
- Benjamin Franklin: Cultural Protestant (Oxford University Press, 2021)
- American Catholic: The Politics of Faith During the Cold War (2020, ISBN 978-1501700576)
- Seeking a Better Country: 300 Years of American Presbyterianism with John R. Muether (2nd ed. 2019)
- Damning Words: The Life and Religious Times of H. L. Mencken (Library of Religious Biography) (2016, ISBN 978-0802873446)
- Calvinism: A History (Yale University Press, 2013 ISBN 978-0300148794)
- From Billy Graham to Sarah Palin: Evangelicals and the Betrayal of American Conservatism (2011, ISBN 978-0802866288)
- Between the Times: The Orthodox Presbyterian Church in Transition, 1945–1990 (2011)
- A Secular Faith: Why Christianity Favors the Separation of Church and State (2006, ISBN 978-1-56663-576-9)
- John Williamson Nevin: High Church Calvinist (New Jersey: Presbyterian and Reformed, 2005)
- Deconstructing Evangelicalism: Conservative Protestantism in the Age of Billy Graham (2005)
- The Lost Soul of American Protestantism. Rowman & Littlefield, 2004.
- Defending the Faith: J. Gresham Machen and the Crisis of Conservative Protestantism in Modern America (2003)
- Recovering Mother Kirk: A Case for Liturgy in the Reformed Tradition (2003)
- That Old Time Religion (2002)
