= Confessionalism (religion) =

Value of assent to official teachings

In Christianity, confessionalism is a belief in the importance of full and unambiguous assent to the whole of a movement's or denomination's teachings, such as those found in Confessions of Faith, which followers believe to be accurate summaries of the teachings found in Scripture and to show their distinction from other groups – they hold to the Quia form of confessional subscription. Confessionalists believe that differing interpretations or understandings, especially those in direct opposition to traditionally held teachings, cannot be accommodated within a church communion. A denomination or church that shares these beliefs can be called a confessional denomination or confessional church, respectively.

Confessionalism can become a matter of practical relevance in fields such as Christian education and Christian politics. For example, there is a question over whether Christian schools should attempt to enforce a specific religious doctrine, or whether they should simply teach general "Christian values". Similarly, some Christian political parties have been split over whether non-Christians should be allowed to participate – confessionalists, arguing against it, stress the importance of religious doctrine, while non-confessionalists say that shared values are more important than adherence to exact beliefs. The comparative study of confessions is termed symbolics from the term "symbol" used to describe a creed or larger confession.

== History ==
Historically, the term confessionalism for the first time was used in mid-19th century. Of course the phenomenon of confessionalism and the term "confession", from which the term confessionalism derived, is much older, referring once to individual belief, then collective belief. Furthermore, the term confession in different languages implies different notions (faith or denomination in English, croyance, culte, communauté religieuse in French). Adherents of confessional churches have often made a public profession of faith to declare agreement with their particular confession.

In the 16th and 17th centuries the term confession was only used for the documents of belief (cf. Confessio Augustana) while the religious communities of Catholicism, Lutheranism and Calvinism were referred to as "religious parties", different "religions" or "churches" – not as confessions. In the late 18th century the term confession started to expand to religious bodies sharing a common creed. The first evidence is the Wöllner and Prussian Religious Edict of 1788 (though there might be earlier evidences for the English-speaking world). The international Congress of Vienna in 1815 still didn’t use the term confession to mark different Christian denominations. Labelling Christian groups "confessions" implied a certain degree of civil progress and tolerance, accepting that other parties also claimed absolute truth. The original intention to pacify conflicts between the denominations in the 19th century turned into its opposite: Confession bore the ground for new conflicts, as for example in the Cologne conflict about mixed marriages in 1837. The Roman Catholic Church refused to consider itself as merely a confession.

However ahistorical the terminology (cf. the latest semantical research of L. Hölscher), historians talk about the Early Modern period as a "confessional age" (first evidence: Ernst Troeltsch, 1906) and with good reasons use the terms of confessionalization and confessionalism.

In the second half of the 19th century the term confessionalism occurred in dictionaries. It referred to internal Protestant conflicts (orthodoxy v. "living" Protestantism), to conflicts between different confessional groups, to everyday resentments and to any exaggerated emphasis of religious identity against competing identities. The Catholic Staatslexikon in 1959 defines Confessionalism as the "endeavour of the confessions to defend their religious doctrine" and their identity, in opposition to indifferentism, but it also meant the "overemphasis of confessional differences, esp. transferring them into the realm of state and society". In later editions of dictionaries there is no lemma any more since the phenomenon lost its wider impact. Confessionalism exerted a severe impact on European social and political history between 1530 and 1648 and again between 1830 and the 1960s.

Now confessionalism is of minor relevance in European state churches. It rose to importance in the early 19th century and nearly vanished in the 1960s. This is why some scholars talk about this time-period as a "second confessional age", comparing the dimensions of confessionalism with the "first confessional age" (16th to 17th centuries, for example Lutheran orthodoxy, Reformed scholasticism, Tridentine-era Catholicism, and the Thirty-nine Articles in Anglicanism). In intra-Christian dialogue, confessionalism was a significant consideration during the colloquies of Regensburg, Marburg, Montbéliard, and Kassel. However, various European free churches today consider their confessions to be important, for example, the Evangelical Lutheran Free Church and the Independent Evangelical-Lutheran Church both require clergy and congregations to declare a quia subscription to the Book of Concord, as such the denominations are classified as being Confessional Lutheran. Those that are or were part of the Confessing Movement who eventually deemed dealing with theological liberalism and theological progressivism within Mainline Protestant denominations as not being tenable anymore would later join or start Confessional Churches and Denominations that continue with the traditions of their respective denominations and in maintaining orthodox doctrine while being ecclesiastically separate.

== Controversy ==
The idea of confessionalism can generate considerable controversy. Some Christian denominations, particularly newer ones, focus more on the "experience" of Christianity than on its formal doctrines, and are accused by confessionalists of adopting a vague and unfocused form of religion. Anti-confessionalists, declaring that the confessionalist view of religion is too narrow and that people should be able to seek religion in their own way, generally argue that it is the spirit and values of religion that matter, rather than the particular rules. Confessionalists generally counter that the "spirit and values" of any given faith cannot be attained without first knowing truth as given in formal dogmas.

== Confessional identity vs. subscription ==
Scholars of church history distinguish between a denomination possessing a formal confessional identity and the mechanisms used to enforce it. A denomination may formally retain historic confessions in its constitution—such as the Presbyterian Church (USA)'s Book of Confessions—but interpret them as broad, historical guidelines rather than strictly binding documents, allowing for significant doctrinal latitude among its clergy.

In contrast, other confessional denominations require strict Confessional subscription, a formal vow where clergy must agree with the confession's specific propositions. Disputes over how strictly a confession should be interpreted, and whether church courts have the authority to enforce doctrinal boundaries, have been a major source of institutional controversy and schism, particularly in Protestant history.

== See also ==
- Confessional state
- Caesaropapism
- Separation of church and state
- Elite religion
- Divine rule
- State religion
