= Westminster Confession of Faith =

Presbyterian creedal statement, created 1646

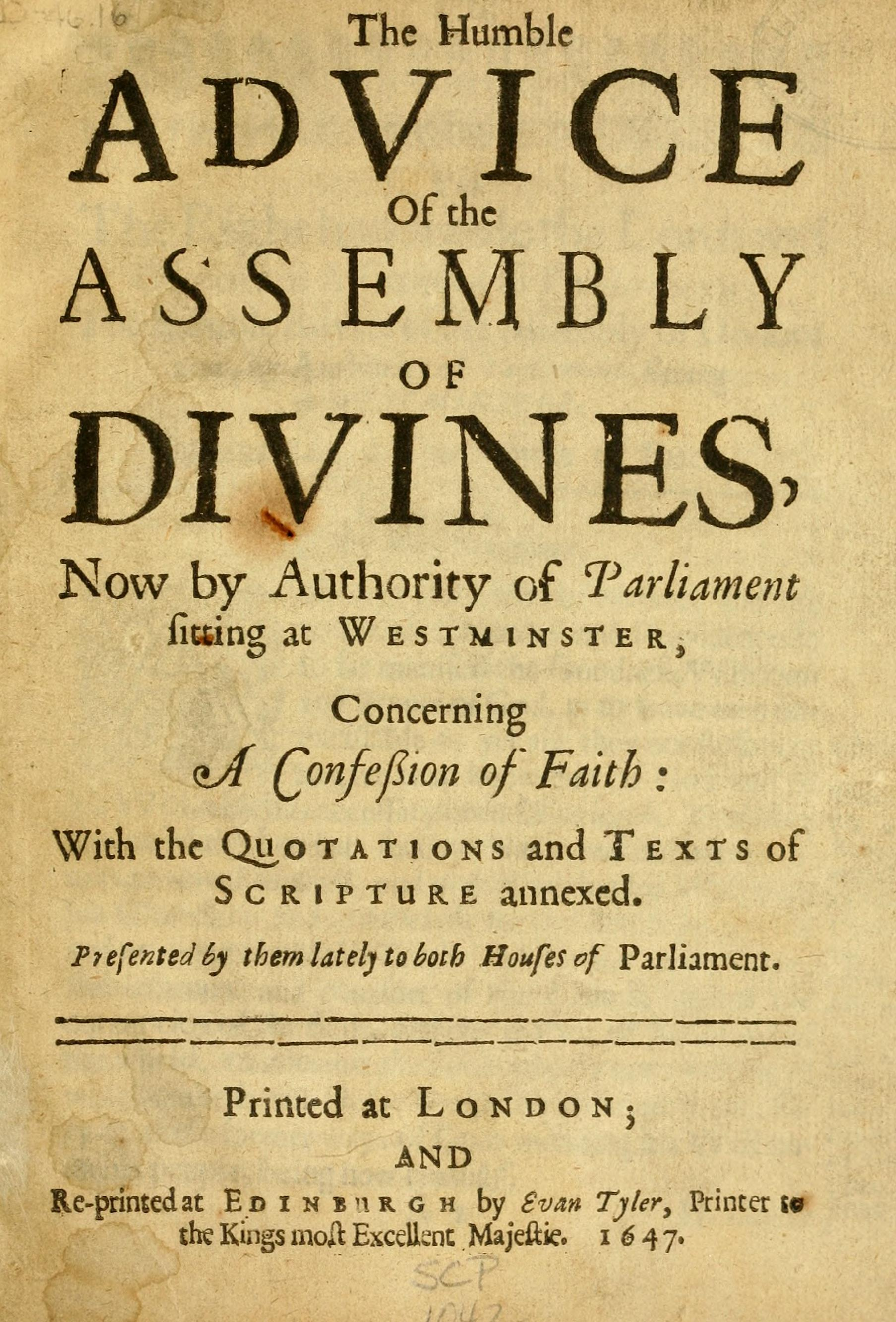
Title page of a 1647 printing of the confession

The Westminster Confession of Faith, or simply the Westminster Confession, is a Reformed Christian creed. Drawn up by the 1646 Westminster Assembly as part of the Westminster Standards to be a confession of the Church of England, it became and remains the subordinate standard of doctrine in the Church of Scotland and has been influential within Presbyterian churches worldwide.

In 1643, the English Parliament called upon "learned, godly and judicious Divines" to meet at Westminster Abbey in order to provide advice on issues of worship, doctrine, government and discipline of the Church of England. Their meetings, over a period of five years, produced the confession of faith, as well as a Larger Catechism and a Shorter Catechism. For more than three hundred years, various churches around the world have adopted the confession and the catechisms as their standards of doctrine, subordinate to the Bible. For the Church of Scotland and the various denominations which spring from it directly, though, only the Confession and not the Catechisms is the subordinate standard, the Catechisms not being re-legislated in 1690.

The Westminster Confession was modified and adopted by Congregationalists in England in the form of the Savoy Declaration (1658). English Presbyterians, Congregationalists, and some Anglicans, would together come to be known as Nonconformists, because they did not conform to the Act of Uniformity (1662) establishing the Church of England as the only legally approved church, though they were in many ways united by their common confessions, built on the Westminster Confession.

== Historical context ==
During the English Civil War (1642–1649), the English Parliament raised armies in an alliance with the Covenanters who by then were the de facto government of Scotland, against the forces of Charles I, King of England, Scotland and Ireland. The purpose of the Westminster Assembly, in which 121 Puritan clergymen participated, was to provide official documents for the reformation of the Church of England. The Church of Scotland had recently overthrown the bishops imposed by the King and reinstated presbyterianism (see Bishops' Wars). For this reason, as a condition for entering into the alliance with the English Parliament, the Scottish Parliament formed the Solemn League and Covenant with the English Parliament, which meant that the Church of England would abandon episcopalianism and consistently adhere to reformed standards of doctrine and worship. The Confession and Catechisms were produced in order to secure the help of the Scots against the king.

The work of the Westminster Assembly was a product of the British Reformed tradition, taking as a major source the Thirty-Nine Articles as well as the theology of James Ussher and his Irish Articles of 1615. The divines also considered themselves to be within the broader European Reformed tradition. They were in frequent correspondence with continental Reformed theologians, and sought their approval. They also drew upon the pre-Reformation British theological tradition, which emphasized biblical knowledge and was influenced by the Augustinian theological tradition exemplified by Anselm, Thomas Bradwardine, and John Wycliffe. The recorded debates of the Assembly are full of citations of Church Fathers and medieval scholastic theologians.

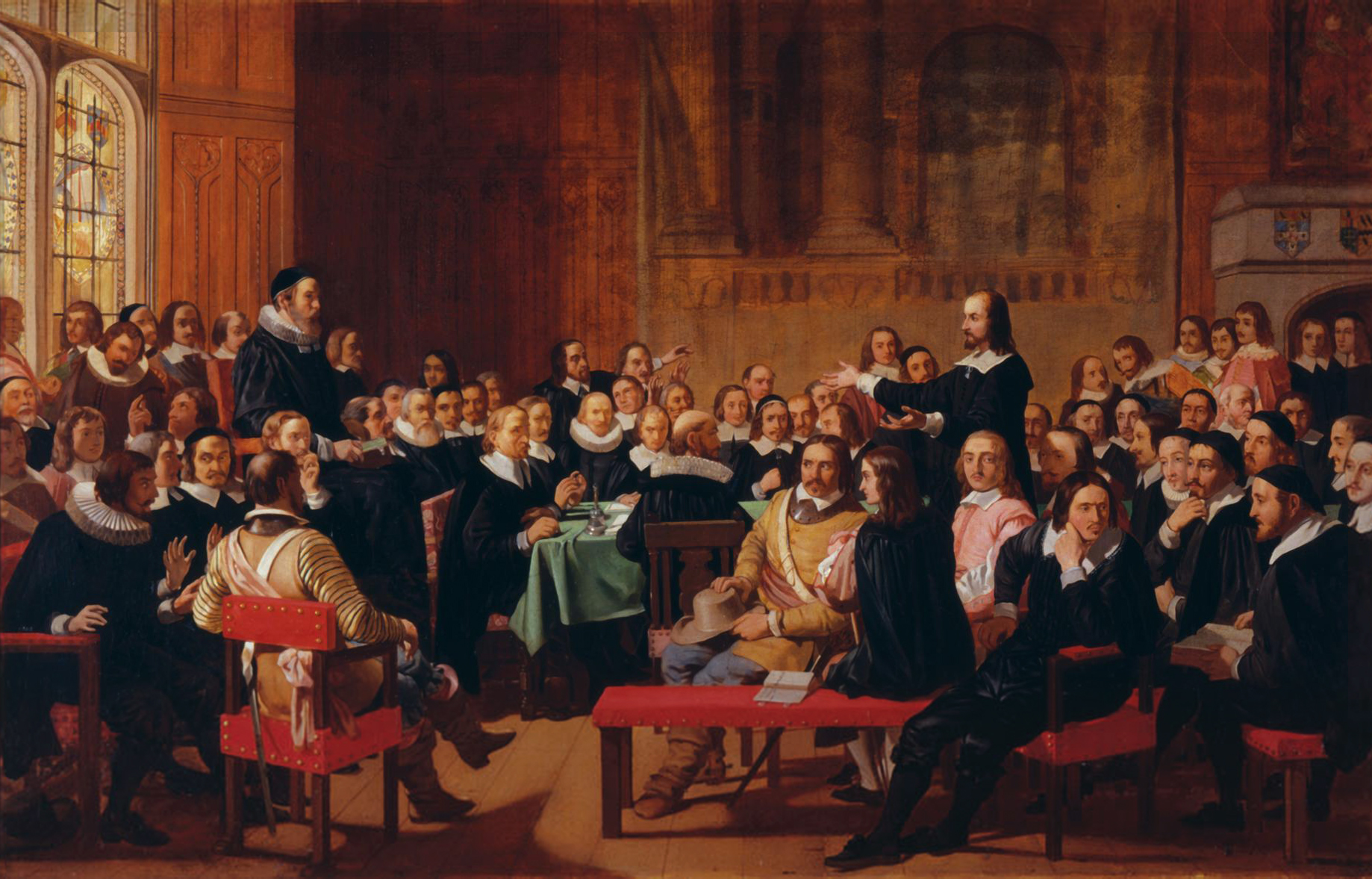
The Assertion of Liberty of Conscience by the Independents at the Westminster Assembly of Divines, painted by John Rogers Herbert, c. 1844

The Scottish Commissioners who were present at the Assembly were satisfied with the Confession of Faith, and in 1646, the document was sent to the English parliament to be ratified, and submitted to the General Assembly of the Scottish Kirk. The Church of Scotland adopted the document, without amendment, in 1647. In England, the House of Commons returned the document to the Assembly with the requirement to compile a list of proof texts from Scripture. After vigorous debate, the Confession was then in part adopted as the Articles of Christian Religion in 1648, by act of the English parliament, omitting section 4 of chapter 20 (Of Christian Liberty), sections 4–6 of chapter 24 (Of Marriage and Divorce), and chapters 30 and 31 (Of Church Censures and Of Synods and Councils). The next year, the Scottish parliament ratified the Confession without amendment.

In 1660, the Restoration of the British monarchy and Anglican episcopacy resulted in the nullification of these acts of the two parliaments. However, when William of Orange replaced the Catholic King James VII of Scotland and II of England on the thrones of Scotland, England and Ireland, he gave royal assent to the Scottish parliament's ratification of the Confession (but not the Catechisms), again without change, in 1690.

== Contents ==
The confession is a systematic exposition of Calvinist theology (which neo-orthodox scholars refer to as "scholastic Calvinism"), influenced by Puritan and covenant theology. It includes doctrines common to most of Christianity such as the Trinity and Jesus' sacrificial death and resurrection, and it contains doctrines specific to Protestantism such as sola scriptura and sola fide. Its more controversial features include the covenant of works with Adam, the Puritan doctrine that assurance of salvation is not a necessary consequence of faith, a minimalist conception of worship, and Puritan Sabbatarianism.

It states that the pope is the Antichrist, which was a very common belief in seventeenth-century England. It also stated that the Catholic mass is a form of idolatry, that the civil magistrates have divine authority to punish heresy, and rules out marriage with non-Christians.

=== Holy Scriptures, the Trinity and predestination ===
The confession begins with a definition of the Bible's content as well as an explication of its role within the church. Chapter 1 declares that the Bible, both Old and New Testaments, is the inspired, written Word of God. As the Word of God, the Bible is considered "the rule of faith and life." The Holy Scriptures are said to possess infallible truth and divine authority, containing "all things necessary for [God's] own glory, man's salvation, faith, and life", so that no new revelations or human traditions can be added to it. The Confession of Faith states that, in the original languages, the Bible was kept pure and authentic. Because of this, the Scriptures alone are the church's final authority in all religious disputes. The confession states that "the Holy Spirit speaking in the Scripture" is "the supreme judge" of councils, ancient writers, doctrines, and private revelation.

After describing the attributes of God, chapter 2 of the confession endorses the traditional doctrine of the Trinity, which holds that the one and only God exists as three persons, "of one substance, power, and eternity", namely, God the Father, God the Son, and God the Holy Spirit.

Chapter 3 affirms the Calvinist doctrine of predestination: that God foreordained who would be among the elect (and therefore saved), while he passed by those who would be damned for their sins. The confession states that from eternity God did "freely, and unchangeably ordain whatsoever comes to pass". By God's decree, "some men and angels are predestinated unto everlasting life; and others foreordained to everlasting death."

Chapter 4 recounts the Genesis creation narrative and affirms that human beings were created in the image of God with immortal souls, having fellowship with God and dominion over other creatures. Chapter 6 recounts the Fall of Man whereby humans committed original sin and became subject to total depravity. According to the confession, the consequence of the fall and sin is that sinners are guilty before God, under divine wrath and the curse of the law, and, ultimately, subject to spiritual death. The confession states that the fall and all other sins were foreordained by divine providence; however, the confession also teaches that sin "proceedeth only from the creature, and not from God". God cannot be the author of sin because he is entirely holy and righteous.

=== Covenant theology, Christ's mediation and free will ===
Chapter 7 is a description of covenant theology, which holds that God has dealt with humans through various covenants. In the first covenant, a covenant of works, Adam and his descendants were promised life on the condition of perfect obedience. The fall made it impossible for man to keep this covenant, so God made another covenant, this one called the covenant of grace. In the covenant of grace, God freely offered sinners life and salvation by Jesus Christ. As part of this covenant, God promises to give the elect the Holy Spirit to make them willing and able to believe.

According to the confession, the covenant of grace was administered differently in the time of the law (during Old Testament times) and in the time of the gospel (during and after New Testament times). Under the law, the covenant was administered by promises, prophecies, sacrifices, circumcision, the paschal lamb, and other types and ordinances instituted among the Jewish people. These all anticipated Jesus Christ, the promised Messiah, and were sufficient to give the elect of that time forgiveness of sins and eternal salvation. The confession teaches that under the gospel, the covenant of grace is dispensed more fully through the preaching of the Bible and the administration of the sacraments of baptism and the Lord's Supper.

Chapter 8 declares that Jesus Christ, the second person of the Trinity, was chosen by God the Father to be the mediator between God and man and hold the threefold office of prophet, priest, and king. It affirms his incarnation, virgin birth, and dual nature as both God and man. In his human nature, Christ was without sin. He was crucified and buried, and the confession teaches that he was bodily resurrected and afterward ascended into heaven where he intercedes on behalf of the living. It also teaches that Christ will return to earth to judge the world.

Chapter 8 also describes Christ's sacrificial death as satisfying God's justice and attaining both humanity's reconciliation with God and everlasting life for the elect. Salvation is granted to individuals by means of the word of God and the Holy Spirit, who persuades them to believe and obey. Chapter 9 teaches that man's will is free, and that because of the fall, man lost the ability to do anything spiritually pleasing to God, and man's will became enslaved to his sinful nature. Man, after conversion, regains the ability to please God and to choose good, but sin remains within. Complete sinless perfection is only attainable after death in the state of glorification.

=== Salvation ===
Chapters 10 through 18 describe various phases or aspects of salvation. The confession teaches that—by the Holy Spirit and the preaching of the word—God effectually calls the elect out of the state of sin and death toward faith in Jesus Christ and spiritual life. It teaches that "elect infants" and "all other elect persons who are uncapable of being outwardly called by the ministry of the Word" are regenerated and saved.

Chapter 11 covers the doctrine of justification. It affirms the Reformation doctrines of justification by faith alone and the imputation of Christ's righteousness to the elect (the Catholic teaching of infused righteousness is specifically rejected). Justification can never be lost, but the justified are still able to sin and, as a result, confession and repentance must be ongoing. Chapter 12 states that all who are justified also partake in the grace of adoption and become children of God. In addition, those who are effectually called and regenerated are also sanctified. In sanctification, the dominion of sin is eliminated and lust is weakened and suppressed as the individual grows in holiness.

Chapter 14 defines saving faith as that which enables people to believe to the saving of their souls. The confession states that it is the work of the Holy Spirit and is ordinarily accomplished by the preaching of the word. Saving faith is strengthened and increased by the preaching of the word, the sacraments, and prayer. This faith enables a person to believe that whatever is revealed in the Bible is true and to rest on Christ alone for eternal life.

Chapter 15 stresses the need for repentance alongside saving faith. While repentance (rejecting sin and committing to obey God's commandments) does not earn forgiveness (which is the result of divine grace), the confession states that no sinner "may expect pardon without it." The confession also describes the role of private and public confession of sin in the life of a Christian. Chapter 16 explains the role of good works (actions done in obedience to God's commandments) in the Christian life and their relationship to salvation. Good works are said to be the result of the Holy Spirit's influence and are evidence of true faith; however, good works cannot earn or merit salvation or forgiveness of sins.

Chapter 17 presents the doctrine of the perseverance of the saints, which holds that it is impossible for those effectually called to "fall away" from the state of grace or, in other words, lose their salvation. Chapter 18 states that believers can receive assurance of faith. This assurance is based on "the promises of salvation, the inward evidence of those graces unto which these promises are made, the testimony of the Spirit of adoption witnessing with our spirits that we are the children of God". The confession does not teach that assurance is instantaneous upon conversion; rather, it states that "a true believer may wait long, and conflict with many difficulties, before he be partaker of it".

=== Law, Christian liberty and worship ===
Chapter 19 discusses God's law and Christian ethics. The confession states that while the ceremonial parts of biblical law have been abrogated under the New Covenant, the moral law as described in the Ten Commandments and the "general equity" of the civil law in the Old Testament remains binding to all people and nations. While true believers are neither "justified, or condemned" by the law, it serves "as a rule of life informing them of the will of God, and their duty". The confession also teaches that the Holy Spirit enables "the will of man to do that freely, and cheerfully, which the will of God, revealed in the law, requireth to be done."

Chapter 20 states that "God alone is Lord of the conscience, and hath left it free from the doctrines and commandments of men." The purpose of Christian liberty is to enable Christians to "serve the Lord without fear, in holiness and righteousness before Him." The confession warns that Christian liberty cannot be used to justify sinful behavior or to resist lawful secular and church authority.

Chapter 21 describes the acceptable parameters of Reformed worship as governed by the regulative principle of worship. It also outlines a Puritan Sabbatarian position in regards to Christian behavior on Sunday, the Christian Sabbath. Chapter 22 describes the appropriate use of oaths and solemn vows, which are part of religious worship because the person calls upon God.

=== Civil government and marriage ===
Chapter 23 describes the role of the civil authorities in relation to the church. Governments are ordained by God to maintain justice and peace and to punish evil doers. The civil magistrate has no right to interfere with the preaching of the word of God or administration of the sacraments. The power of the keys is reserved exclusively to church authorities. Nevertheless, the civil magistrate has a duty to preserve church unity, suppress heresy, and prevent corruption and abuse within the church. To fulfill these obligations, the magistrate has authority to convene synods and ensure that its deliberations are agreeable to "the mind of God."

Chapter 23 also teaches that Christians are obligated to pray for civil authorities and to obey lawful commands. A magistrate's legal authority is not lost because of unbelief or religious differences. The confession denies that the Pope has any jurisdiction over civil magistrates or authority to deprive magistrates of their office if he determines them to be heretics.

Chapter 24 covers Reformed teaching on marriage and divorce. Marriage is to be heterosexual and monogamous. The purpose of marriage is to provide for the mutual help of husband and wife, the birth of legitimate children, the growth of the church, and the prevention of "uncleanness." The confession discourages interfaith marriage with non-Christians, Roman Catholics, or "other idolaters". In addition, godly persons should not be "unequally yoked" in marriage to "notoriously wicked" persons. Incestuous marriage, defined according to biblical guidelines, is also prohibited. The only grounds for divorce are adultery and willful abandonment by a spouse.

=== Church ===
Chapter 25 addresses Reformed ecclesiology or the teachings about the Christian Church. The confession teaches that the church is catholic (or universal) and both invisible and visible. The invisible church is made up of all the elect who will ever live. Christ is the head of the church, and the church is the body of Christ and the bride of Christ. The visible church includes all people alive throughout the world who "profess the true religion" and their children. It is described as the kingdom of Christ and the house and family of God. The confession teaches that there is no ordinary possibility of salvation outside of the visible church. It is said that Christ gave to the visible church "the ministry, oracles, and ordinances of God" for the perfecting of the saints.

The confession teaches that local churches can be more or less pure depending on how faithfully they adhere to correct doctrine and worship. Yet, it acknowledges that even the purest churches might contain some theological error, while other churches have become so corrupted that they can no longer be called churches of Christ but instead are of Satan. The confession affirms that only Jesus Christ can be head of the church. It states that the pope is an Antichrist who "exalteth himself, in the Church, against Christ and all that is called God."

Chapter 26 presents Reformed teaching on the communion of saints. This is the spiritual union that Christians have with Christ and with one another that allows them to share in the grace, suffering, death, resurrection, and glory of Christ.

=== Sacraments ===
Chapter 27 summarizes Reformed sacramental theology. It states that sacraments were established by God as "signs and seals" of the covenant of grace to represent Christ and his benefits, to visibly differentiate members of the church from the rest of world and draw them to God's service. The confession teaches that in every sacrament there is a spiritual relation between the sign and what is being signified; because of this, the names and effects of one are attributed to the other. The effectiveness of a sacrament depends upon the work of the Holy Spirit and the words of institution, which contains a promise of benefit to worthy receivers. The confession teaches that only ordained ministers can provide the sacraments, of which there are only two: baptism and the Lord's Supper.

Chapter 28 presents a summary of Reformed baptismal theology. Baptism joins a person to the visible church and signifies the person's union with Christ, regeneration, forgiveness of sin and newness of life. Individuals should be baptized in water using the Trinitarian formula ("in the name of the Father, and of the Son, and of the Holy Ghost"). Baptism by immersion is not necessary; affusion and aspersion are acceptable modes. The confession approves of infant baptism if one or both parents are Christians. While it teaches that neglecting baptism is a "great sin", the confession does not endorse baptismal regeneration in the ex opere operato sense. It states that it is possible to be regenerated without baptism, and unregenerated with baptism. This is because the effectiveness of baptism is not tied to the moment in time it is administered; the grace promised is granted by the Holy Spirit to the elect according to God's own will and at the time of his choosing. According to the confession, baptism is to be received only once.

Chapter 29 summarizes Presbyterian beliefs about the Lord's Supper. It states that the sacrament is to be observed in the church until the end of the world "for the perpetual remembrance of the sacrifice of Himself in His death; the sealing all benefits thereof, unto true believers, their spiritual nourishment and growth in Him, their further engagement in and to all duties which they owe unto Him; and, to be a bond and pledge of their communion with Him, and with each other, as members of His mystical body."

The confession states that the Lord's Supper is not the actual sacrifice of Christ but rather a commemoration of Christ's one sacrifice for the remission of sins and an offering of praise to God. It explicitly condemns the Roman Catholic Church's teaching of "the popish sacrifice of the mass". It also rejects the Roman Catholic doctrine of transubstantiation, which states that after consecration by a priest the bread and wine miraculously become the body and blood of Christ. Rather, the confession teaches that communicants receive the body and blood of Christ and all the benefits of his death spiritually by faith, while the bread and wine remain physically unchanged. Ignorant, wicked and ungodly persons may eat the bread and wine, but they do not receive Christ. Instead, these unworthy persons are "guilty of the body and blood of the Lord" and commit great sin; for this reason, such persons should not be admitted to the sacrament.

=== Church government and discipline ===
Chapter 30 describes the role of church officers, who are appointed by Christ to govern the church. These officers hold the keys of the kingdom, giving them power to discipline church members through admonition, suspension from the Lord's Supper for a period of time, and excommunication, according to the severity of the offense. Church discipline is for the purpose of leading sinful church members to repentance, deterring others from similar behavior, vindicating the honor of Christ, and preventing the wrath of God from falling on the entire church.

Chapter 31 states that synods and church councils have authority to settle religious controversies, make rules for the church and public worship, and judge cases of misconduct in the church. While synods may be called by civil authorities, they only have jurisdiction over ecclesiastical affairs and are not to intervene in civil affairs except "by way of humble petition in cases extraordinary; or, by way of advice".

=== Eschatology ===
Chapters 32 and 33 concern Christian eschatology. Chapter 32 describes what occurs after death—while the body decomposes, the immortal soul immediately returns to God. The souls of the righteous are then made perfect in holiness and received into heaven where they "behold the face of God" and wait for the redemption of their bodies. The souls of the wicked are sent to hell where they remain in torment until the judgment. The confession rejects the idea of purgatory because it is not present in scripture. The confession teaches that on the last day, those alive will not die but will be changed, and all the dead will be resurrected with the same bodies they had when alive. The bodies of the unjust will be "raised to dishonour", but the bodies of the just will be raised "unto honour".

Chapter 33 describes the Last Judgment in which the Father will give Christ authority to judge all apostate angels and every person that has lived on earth. Those judged will "give an account of their thoughts, words, and deeds" and will "receive according to what they have done in the body, whether good or evil." God's purpose in dispensing judgment is to show the glory of his mercy—by saving the elect—and of his justice—by the damnation of the reprobate. The righteous will receive eternal life in the presence of God, and the wicked will receive eternal torment and destruction. The date and time of the Last Judgment is unknown.

== Usage ==
The Westminster Confession was adopted as a doctrinal standard by various Presbyterian churches around the world. These churches have at times repudiated or changed different parts of the confession over the years.

=== Australia ===
The Presbyterian Church of Australia holds to the Westminster Confession as its standard, subordinate to the Word of God, and read in the light of a declaratory statement. The Reformed Presbyterian Church of Australia also holds to the Confession as a subordinate standard.

=== England and Wales ===
- Evangelical Presbyterian Church in England and Wales - subordinate standard (excepting the authority of the "civil magistrate" over presbyteries in religious or moral matters and the identification of the Antichrist exclusively with the papacy which is deemed a matter of individual interpretation). Additionally, individual elders and sessions may determine their own positions on the establishment principle as concerns the relationship between the church and state and the question of marriages to close relatives of deceased spouses.

=== Scotland ===
- Church of Scotland - subordinate standard but since 1986 has dissociated itself from four sections of the Confession (relating to monastic vows, marriage to Catholics and non-Christians, the identification of the Pope with the Antichrist and the Mass). Additionally, liberty of opinion is granted on those matters which do not enter into the substance of the faith.
- Free Church of Scotland - subordinate standard
- Free Church of Scotland -Continuing (since 2000)
- Free Presbyterian Church of Scotland (Since 1893)
- Associated Presbyterian Church (since 1989)
- United Free Church of Scotland - subordinate standard (but with liberty of judgement allowed on matters which do not enter into the substance of the faith)

=== Ireland (including Northern Ireland) ===
- The Presbyterian Church in Ireland accepts the Westminster Confession as its subordinate standard, along with the Shorter and Larger Catechisms.
- The Free Presbyterian Church of Ulster retains the Confession as its "subordinate standard" of doctrine.

=== United States ===
With the Adopting Act of 1729, the Synod of Philadelphia officially adopted the Westminster Confession as the doctrinal standard for American Presbyterians. All ministerial candidates were required to subscribe to it but were allowed to declare scruples to those parts considered nonessential. This compromise left a permanent legacy to following generations of Presbyterians in America resulting in permanent controversies over the manner in which a minister is bound to accept the document; and it has left the American versions of the Westminster Confession more amenable to the will of the church to amend it.

When the Presbyterian Church in the United States of America was formed in 1789, it adopted the Westminster standards, as containing the system of doctrine taught in the Holy Scriptures. However, it revised chapters 20.4, 23.3, and 31.2 of the Confession, basically removing the civil magistrate (i.e., the state) from involvement in ecclesiastical matters. It also removed the phrase "tolerating a false religion" from the list of sins forbidden in Answer 109 of the Larger Catechism, and replaced "depopulations" in Answer 142 with "depredation." The Confession was amended again in 1887, when the final sentence of chapter 24.4, which forbade the marrying of the close kindred of one's deceased spouse, was removed.

The Presbyterian Church in the U.S.A. adopted more sweeping revisions of its Confession in 1903. Chapter 16.7, on the works of unregenerate men, was rewritten. The last sentence of chapter 22.3, which forbade the refusing of a proper oath when imposed by lawful authority, was removed. Chapter 25.6, on the head of the church, was rewritten, and the identification of the Roman Catholic pope as the Antichrist was removed.

== See also ==
- Declaratory statement
- List of Members of the Westminster Assembly
- Long Parliament
- Glorious Revolution
- Religion in the United Kingdom
- The Bloudy Tenent of Persecution for Cause of Conscience, 1644, by Roger Williams
