= Act of Faith (Christian) =

Prayer professing the beliefs of Christianity

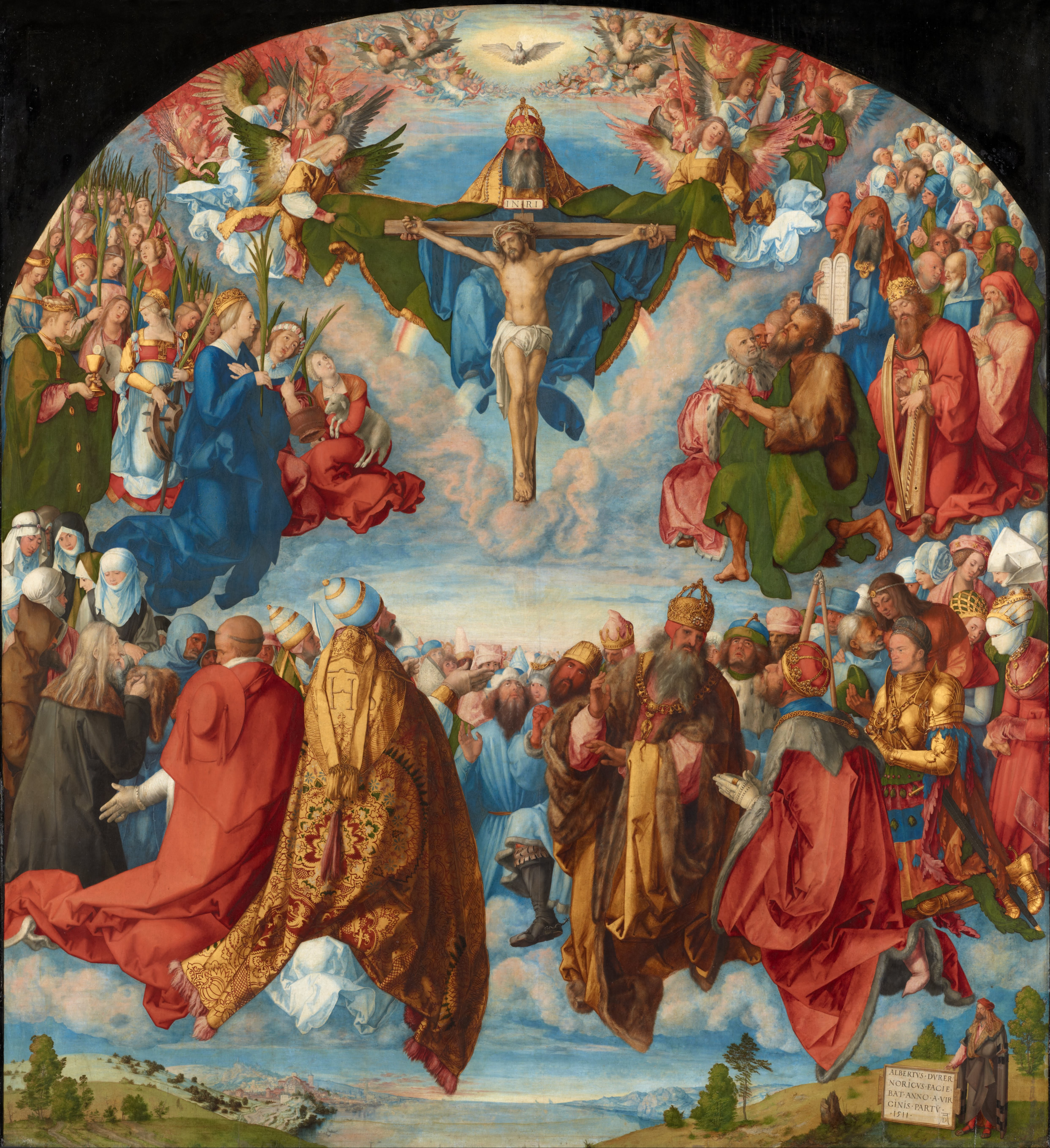
Adoration of the Trinity by Albrecht Dürer (1511)

An act of faith is a prayer in which a person professes the beliefs of Christianity. In the Catholic Church, an individual is required to make an act of faith when they come to the age of accountability. An example of an act of faith is as follows:

I Firmly believe there is one God; and that
in this one God there are three
persons, the Father, the Son, and the
Holy Ghost; that God the Son took to
himself the nature of man in the Virgin
Mary's womb, by the operation of the
power of the Holy Ghost; and that in this
our human nature, he was crucified and
died for us; that afterwards he rose again,
and ascended into heaven, from whence
he shall come to repay to the just ever
lasting glory, and to the wicked everlasting
punishment: moreover, I believe whatso-
ever else the catholic church proposes to be
believed, and this, because God, who is the
sovereign Truth, which can neither deceive
nor be deceived, has revealed all
these things to this church.

— The Posey of Prayers, p. 67

== See also ==
- Creed
- Confirmation
- Sinner's prayer, evangelical term referring to an act of conversion
