= John Muether =

American author and librarian

John R. Muether
- Occupations: Author, professor, librarian
- Theological work
- Tradition or movement: Reformed, Calvinism

John R. Muether is Professor of Church History at Reformed Theological Seminary in Orlando, Florida, as well as the Dean of Libraries. He is the co-editor of the Nicotine Theological Journal (along with D.G. Hart). He is a ruling elder in the Orthodox Presbyterian Church, as well as being their denominational historian.

== Early life and education ==
Muether was raised on Long Island, New York. He graduated from Gordon College (B.A.), Westminster Theological Seminary (M.A.R.), and Simmons College (M.S.L.S.).

== Career ==
Muether joined Reformed Theological Seminary in Orlando, Florida in 1989 as Library Director, and later was appointed Dean of Libraries. In addition to overseeing library operations, he teaches core courses in education within the church, Christian engagement with culture, and church government, along with elective courses on various theological topics.

Prior to his tenure at RTS, Muether was a member of the library staff at Harvard Divinity School and later directed the libraries at Western Theological Seminary in Holland, Michigan, and Westminster Theological Seminary in Philadelphia.

== Writings ==
Muether has authored, edited and coauthored multiple books and articles. His works include a biography of Christian philosopher and theologian Cornelius Van Til as well as books on the history of Presbyterianism in America.

== Church Involvement ==
Muether has played an active role in the Orthodox Presbyterian Church (OPC). He has served as a ruling elder and clerk of the session in his local congregation while also holding regional and national leadership positions. He is the denominational historian for the OPC and serves on national committees for Christian education and ministerial training.

== Personal life ==
Muether is married to Kathy, with whom he has four children.

== Bibliography ==
- Reference Works for Theological Research: An Annotated Selective Bibliographical Guide (with Robert J. Kepple), 1992 ISBN 0-8191-8565-5
- Fighting the Good Fight: A Brief History of the Orthodox Presbyterian Church (with D. G. Hart), 1995 ISBN 0-934688-81-8
- With Reverence and Awe: Returning to the Basics of Reformed Worship (with D. G. Hart), 2002 ISBN 0-87552-179-7
- Creator, Redeemer, Consummator: A Festschrift for Meredith G. Kline (edited with Howard Griffith), 2007 ISBN 1-55635-552-1
- Seeking a Better Country: 300 Years of American Presbyterianism (with D. G. Hart), 2007 ISBN 0-87552-574-1
- Cornelius Van Til: Reformed Apologist and Churchman, 2008 ISBN 0-87552-665-9
- Love on the Rocks: Stories of Rusticators and Romance on Mount Desert Island (with Kathryn Muether), 2008 ISBN 978-1-934031-18-6
- Confident of Better Things: Essays Commemorating Seventy-Five Years of the Orthodox Presbyterian Church (edited with Danny E. Olinger), 2011 ISBN 978-0-9833580-1-5
- Covenant Theology: Biblical, Theological, and Historical Perspectives (edited with Guy Prentiss Waters and J. Nicholas Reid), 2020 ISBN 9781433560064
- Orthodox Presbyterian Church History: An Anthology (edited with Camden M. Bucey), 2026 ISBN 979-8244946352
- The Westminster Confession of Faith: A Comprehensive Commentary on Its History, Theology, and Application (edited with J. V. Fesko and D. Blair Smith), 2026 ISBN 9781433591815
