= The Form of Presbyterial Church Government =

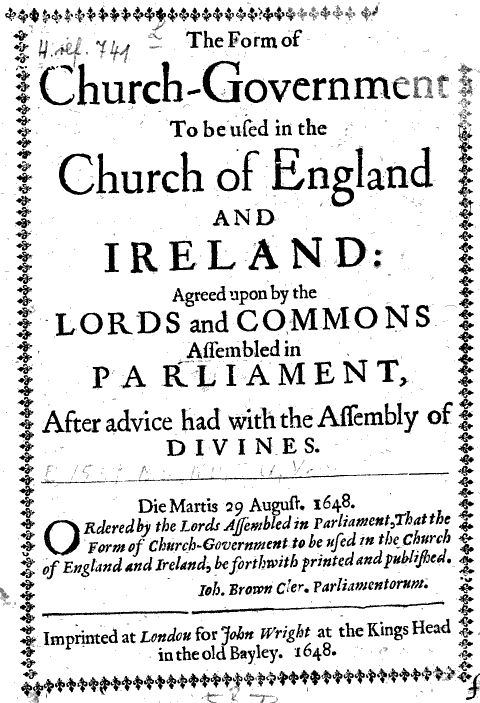
Cover page of 1648 edition.

The Form of Presbyterial Church Government is a document drawn up by the Westminster Assembly dealing with Presbyterian polity. It forms part of the Westminster Standards, and was adopted by the Church of Scotland in 1645.

== Contents ==
=== Church officers ===
The Form of Presbyterial Church Government describes four church officers: pastors, teachers/doctors, elders, and deacons.

The pastor is a "minister of the gospel", while the doctor is a minister who "doth more excel in exposition of scripture, in teaching sound doctrine and convincing gainsayers than he doth in application". The doctors are thus essentially theological professors, "of most excellent use in schools and universities".

The elder is distinguished from the minister, and has the role of church governance, while the deacon is "to take special care in distributing to the necessities of the poor."

=== Church structure ===
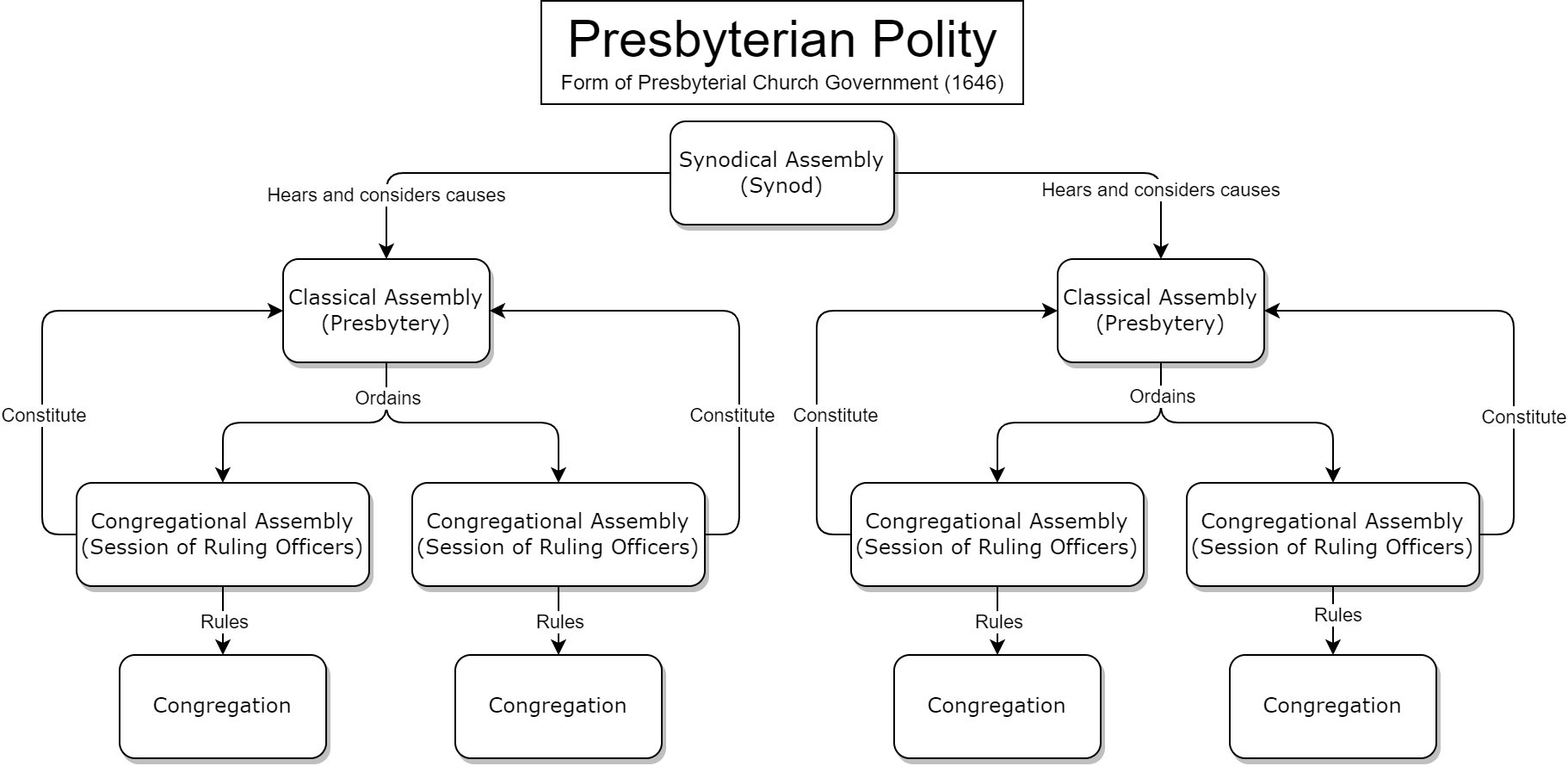
A diagram of presbyterian polity according to The Form of Presbyterial Church Government

The Form of Presbyterial Church Government describes how the Church should be divided up in congregations, ordinarily "by the respective bounds of their dwellings". There ought to be at least one minister per congregation, along with others to govern. These people are to meet regularly, with the minister acting as the "moderator" of the meeting. The document calls this a "congregational assembly".

The Form also argues for a body called the "presbytery" or "classical assembly". It is to consist of ministers and elders, and is to have oversight of a number of congregations.

The third type of assembly is the "synodical assembly", which is above the level of the presbytery.

=== Ordination ===
The final section describes how ministers are to be ordained by the presbytery. It sets the minimum age for ministers at twenty-four, and includes a comprehensive list of points on which a candidate is to be examined.

== See also ==
- Ministers and elders of the Church of Scotland
- Richard Hooker
