= Westminster Standards =

Christian Reformed confessions of faith

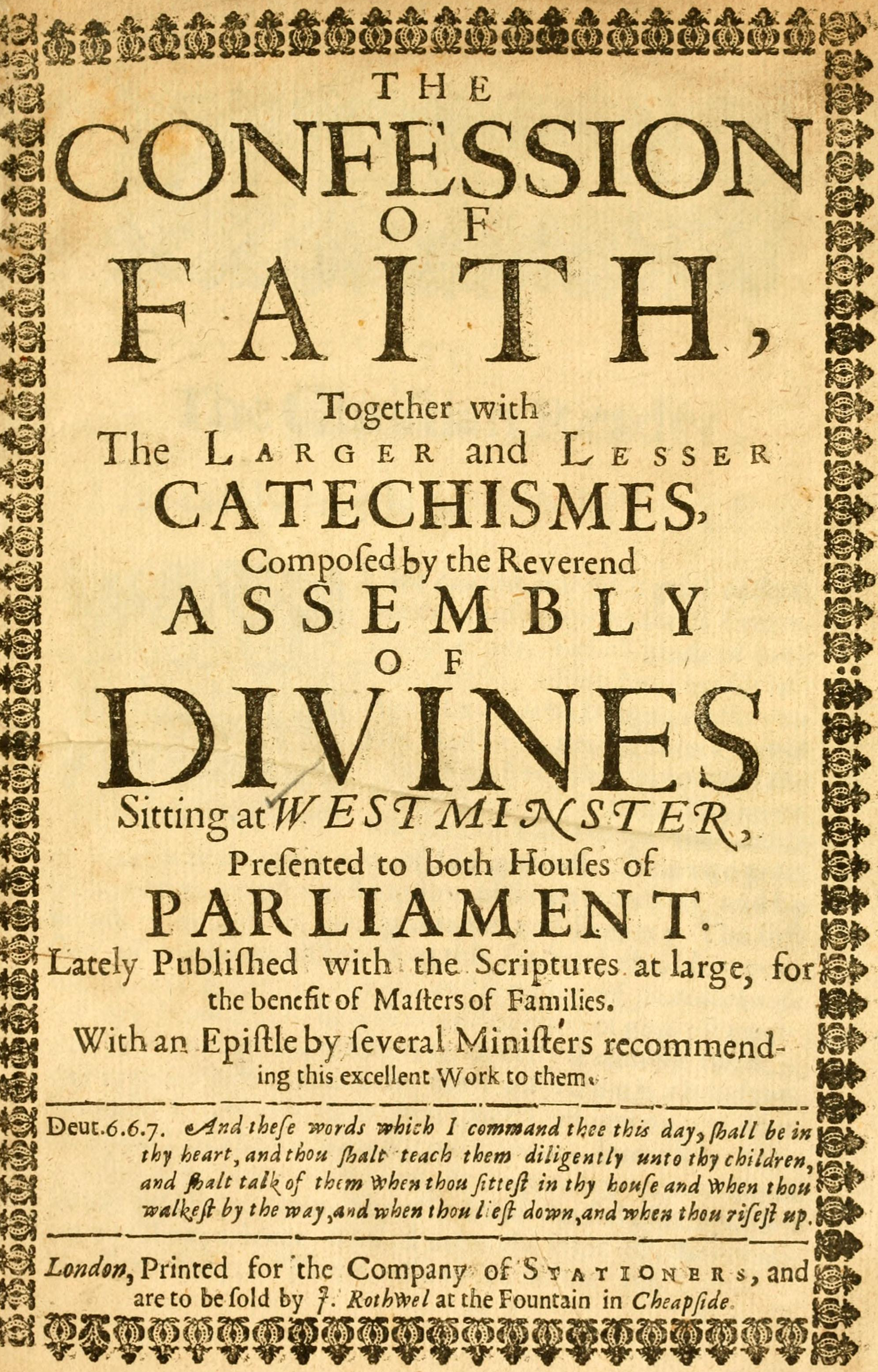
Title page of a 1658 edition of the Standards published in England. It includes the Scripture references "at large" meaning they are fully written out.

The Westminster Standards is a collective name for the documents drawn up by the Westminster Assembly (1643–1649). These include the Westminster Confession of Faith, the Westminster Shorter Catechism, the Westminster Larger Catechism, the Directory of Public Worship, the Directory for Family Worship and the Form of Church Government, and represent the doctrine and church polity of 17th century English and Scottish Presbyterianism. The Westminster Confession of Faith and Larger and Shorter Catechism have been adopted as doctrinal standards by a number of Reformed and Presbyterian Christian denominations, but not the Church of Scotland nor those derived directly from it.

Following the approval of the Confession and catechisms by the Church of Scotland in 1648, printers in England and Scotland began publishing them with other religious documents in collections referred to as the Westminster Standards. In 1658 printers began including the full Scripture passages which are cited in the confessional documents. These collections became standardized in a 1728 edition, which follows a 1679 work published by Covenanters exiled in Holland and contains twenty-two documents including acts of Parliament related to the assembly and devotional works. These collections were intended to serve as ecclesiastical manuals as well as comprehensive popular religious books. The 1728 form of the Standards continues to be printed by the Free Presbyterian Church of Scotland.

In the nineteenth century, several churches separated from the Church of Scotland on the basis of the established church's departure from a list of documents similar to those found in standard collections of the Westminster Standards. Dissenters asserted that the General Assembly had adopted these documents, but the only Westminster document legislated for the Church of Scotland after its reconstitution in 1690 was the Confession.

== See also ==
- Three Forms of Unity
